= Celebrity Big Brother (British TV series) series 6 =

Celebrity Big Brother
- Series 6
- Series six logo
- Presented by: Davina McCall
- No. of days: 22
- No. of housemates: 11
- Winner: Ulrika Jonsson
- Runner-up: Terry Christian
- Companion shows: Big Brother's Little Brother; Big Brother's Big Mouth; Big Brother Live; Diary Room Uncut
- No. of episodes: 28

Release
- Original network: Channel 4
- Original release: 2 January – 23 January 2009

Series chronology
- ← Previous; Series 5 Next → Series 7

Celebrity Big Brother 2009, also known as Celebrity Big Brother 6, is the sixth series of Celebrity Big Brother. It was broadcast on Channel 4, launching on 2 January 2009 and running for 22 days until 23 January 2009. The launch show was watched by approximately 6.4 million people. Davina McCall returned as main presenter, with George Lamb as host of Big Brother's Little Brother, and Jack Whitehall as host of Big Brother's Big Mouth. The winner of this series was Ulrika Jonsson, with Terry Christian second.

This was the first series of Celebrity Big Brother to air since the racism controversy of 2007, during series 5, although Channel 4's sister channel E4 aired a similar spin-off in 2008, entitled Big Brother: Celebrity Hijack.

This series was the least watched Celebrity Big Brother series, averaging 3.3 million viewers; at the time of transmission, it was also the least watched series of any Big Brother in the UK (excluding spin-offs) until the tenth non-celebrity series pulled in 2.5 million. Despite the low viewership, the launch show was the most watched programme of 2009 on Channel 4, raking in 6 million viewers.

Ulrika and Coolio took part in Ultimate Big Brother in 2010. Coolio was removed within the first few days and Ulrika finished seventh on the final night.

== Format ==
Celebrity Big Brother is a game show in which a group of celebrity contestants, referred to as housemates, live in isolation from the outside world in a custom built "house", constantly under video surveillance. During their time in the House, the housemates are required to nominate two of their fellow contestants for potential eviction, and the two or more with the most votes would be nominated. This process is mandatory for all housemates, and failure to comply could result in expulsion from the House. The public then vote, with one of those celebrities evicted from the house. When the final week arrives, the viewers vote for which of the remaining celebrities should win the series, and the housemate with the most votes becomes the winner.

During their time in the House, housemates are given weekly tasks to perform. The housemates wager a portion of their weekly shopping budget on the task, and either win double their wagered fund or lose the wagered fund depending on their performance in the task. The housemates are required to work as a group to complete their tasks, with the format of the tasks varying based on the number of remaining housemates. Throughout the series, some housemates have been given secret tasks that must either be completed individually or with a small group; failure to do so can result in the housemate being nominated or punished in the House. Should the housemates run out of the food provided for them, an emergency ration was available to them. The housemates are forbidden from discussing nominations, and doing so could result in punishment. The format of the series is mainly seen as a social experiment, and requires housemates to interact with others who may have differing ideals, beliefs, and prejudices. Housemates are also required to make visits to the Diary Room during their stay in the House, where they are able to share their thoughts and feelings on their fellow housemates and the game.

== Housemates ==
| Celebrity | Age on entry | Notability | Day entered | Day exited | Result |
|---|---|---|---|---|---|
| Ulrika Jonsson | 41 | Presenter | 1 | 22 | Winner |
| Terry Christian | 48 | Presenter | 1 | 22 | Runner-up |
| Coolio† | 45 | Musician | 1 | 22 | 3rd place |
| Verne Troyer | 40 | Actor | 1 | 22 | 4th place |
| Ben Adams | 27 | Singer | 1 | 22 | 5th place |
| Tommy Sheridan | 44 | Politician | 1 | 20 | Evicted |
| La Toya Jackson | 52 | Jackson family member and singer | 1 | 20 | Evicted |
| Michelle Heaton | 29 | Singer | 1 | 18 | Evicted |
| Mutya Buena | 23 | Singer | 1 | 15 | Walked |
| Tina Malone | 45 | Actress | 1 | 15 | Evicted |
| Lucy Pinder | 25 | Glamour model | 1 | 8 | Evicted |

=== Ben Adams ===
Ben Adams (born 22 November 1981) is an English singer-songwriter, best known for being a member of the British-Norwegian boyband trio, a1. During his time, he developed a close friendship with fellow housemate, Michelle Heaton. On Day 22, Ben had been evicted from the house with 15.2% of the public vote to win, finishing in fifth place.

=== Coolio ===
Coolio (1 August 1963 – 28 September 2022) was an American Grammy Award-winning musician and rapper, who is best known in Britain for his worldwide chart-topping single, Gangsta's Paradise. On Day 22, he became the third evictee on finale night, finishing in a respectable third place. However, in 2010, Coolio returned to Big Brother fame, when he joined Ultimate Big Brother. Coolio died on 28 September 2022.

=== La Toya Jackson ===
La Toya Jackson (born 29 May 1956) is an American singer-songwriter, musician and television personality, best known for being a member of the musical family, The Jacksons. She maintained a career as a solo singer throughout the 1980s and 1990s, and has appeared in certain reality shows in America. La Toya became the second Jackson to enter Big Brother, the first being her brother Jermaine in 2007. On Day 20, she was the fourth person to be evicted from the house in a double eviction, along with Tommy Sheridan.

=== Lucy Pinder ===
Lucy Pinder (born 20 December 1983) is an English glamour model, from Winchester, Hampshire. She was the first housemate to be evicted from the house on Day 8, with 57% of the public vote and losing to Ulrika Jonsson.

=== Michelle Heaton ===
Michelle Heaton (born 19 July 1979) is a pop singer, actress and glamour model, best known for being a former member of the band, Liberty X. During her time in the house, she developed a close friendship with housemate, Ben Adams. On Day 18, Heaton was the third person to be evicted from the Big Brother house, in a surprise eviction.

=== Mutya Buena ===
Mutya Buena (born 21 May 1985) is an English recording artist, who rose to fame as one of the original band members of the all-female R&B/pop trio, Sugababes. On Day 15 between 11:30pm-12midnight, Buena decided to walk from the house, just after surviving eviction.

=== Terry Christian ===
Terry Christian (born 8 May 1960) is a television and radio presenter, whose credits include Channel 4's late night youth entertainment show, The Word and ITV1's moral issues talk show, It's My Life, but also has been involved with BBC Radio 4. On Day 1, Terry became the first celebrity Head of House. On Day 22, he came second on the final night, losing out to Ulrika Jonsson, with 43.3% to win.

=== Tina Malone ===
Tina Malone (born 30 January 1963) is an English actress, best known for her role as Mimi Maguire in the Channel 4 series, Shameless. Despite being on Shameless, she has appeared on shows such as Brookside and dinnerladies. During her time in the house, she has been involved in arguments with Coolio and is known for her loud personality. On Day 15, she became the second person to be evicted from the house with 38.8% of the public vote.

=== Tommy Sheridan ===
Tommy Sheridan (born 7 March 1964) is a Scottish socialist politician, known for being in various prominent roles within the socialist movement in Scotland and for being expelled in 1989 as the Labour Party militant tendency entryist. On Day 20, he became the fifth housemate to be evicted from the house in a double eviction, alongside La Toya Jackson.

=== Ulrika Jonsson ===
Ulrika Jonsson (born 16 August 1967) is a Swedish-British television presenter, best known for her work as a weather reporter on TV-am, presenter of Gladiators and a panellist on Shooting Stars. In 2002, she had a publicised affair with then-England football manager, Sven-Göran Eriksson. She was the only female housemate in this series to make it to the final, eventually going on to win the show on Day 22, despite being nominated every week while in the house.

=== Verne Troyer ===
Verne Troyer (1 January 1969 – 21 April 2018) was an American actor and stunt performer, who is best known for playing Mini-Me in the Austin Powers film series. Troyer is most notable for his height 2 ft 8 in (0.81 m), as a result of cartilage–hair hypoplasia dwarfism. On Day 22, he finished the series in fourth place, despite being the bookmakers' favourite from the first day. Verne Troyer died on 21 April 2018.

== Nominations table ==
| | Day 5 | Day 12 | Day 17 | Day 22 Final | | Nominations received |
|---|---|---|---|---|---|---|
| Ulrika | Not eligible | Ben, La Toya | Terry, Tommy | Winner (Day 22) | | 11 |
| Terry | Ulrika, Lucy, Ben | Michelle, Ulrika | Ben, Verne | Runner-up (Day 22) | | 2 |
| Coolio | Not eligible | Ulrika, Michelle | Ulrika, Michelle | Third place (Day 22) | | 3 |
| Verne | Not eligible | Ulrika, Tina | Ulrika, Terry | Fourth place (Day 22) | | 2 |
| Ben | Not eligible | Tina, Mutya | Ulrika, Coolio | Fifth place (Day 22) | | 4 |
| Tommy | Not eligible | Ulrika, Mutya | Ulrika, Michelle | Evicted (Day 20) | | 3 |
| La Toya | Not eligible | Ulrika, Mutya | Ulrika, Michelle | Evicted (Day 20) | | 1 |
| Michelle | Not eligible | Tina, Coolio | Coolio, Tommy | Evicted (Day 18) | | 6 |
| Mutya | Not eligible | Tommy, Verne | Walked (Day 15) | | | 3 |
| Tina | Not eligible | Michelle, Ben | Evicted (Day 15) | | | 3 |
| Lucy | Not eligible | Evicted (Day 8) | | | | 1 |
| Notes | 1 | none | | 2 | | |
| Against public vote | Lucy, Ulrika | Michelle, Mutya, Tina, Ulrika | Michelle, Ulrika | Ben, Coolio, La Toya, Terry, Tommy, Ulrika, Verne | | |
| Walked | none | | Mutya | none | | |
| Evicted | Lucy; 57.0% to evict | Tina; 38.8% to evict | Michelle; 67.0% to evict | La Toya; 6.6% (out of 7) | Tommy; 9.2% (out of 7) | |
| Evicted | Lucy; 57.0% to evict | Tina; 38.8% to evict | Michelle; 67.0% to evict | Ben; 15.2% (out of 5) | Verne; 15.8% (out of 5) | |
| Evicted | Lucy; 57.0% to evict | Tina; 38.8% to evict | Michelle; 67.0% to evict | Coolio; 25.3% (out of 3) | Terry; 43.3% (out of 2) | |
| Evicted | Lucy; 57.0% to evict | Tina; 38.8% to evict | Michelle; 67.0% to evict | Ulrika; 56.7% to win | | |

Notes

- ^Note 1: In Week 1, as Head of House, Terry nominated Ulrika, Lucy and Ben. On Day 5, housemates then chose who they wanted to save from eviction; they chose Ben.
- ^Note 2: The public were voting for who they wanted to win rather than to evict, and the two with the fewest votes left in a double eviction on Day 20.

== Summary ==
| Day 1 | Entrances | La Toya, Mutya, Verne, Tommy, Lucy, Ben, Tina, Coolio, Michelle, Terry and Ulrika entered the Big Brother House. |
| Day 1 | Events | Terry became the Head of House as he was the only housemate left without a bed. |
| Day 2 | Tasks | For today's task, housemates had to decide between themselves who should receive which credit. One housemate would receive a starring credit, two would get a 'co-starring' credit, two would receive a 'featuring' credit, three housemates would be extras and 3 housemates would get no credit at all. After they decided, Head of House Terry would film the credited housemates in a "closing credits style" which would be broadcast at the end of the highlights show. In a twist to the task, Terry secretly watched his fellow housemates' behaviour during the task and had to decide who has the most inflated ego. He chose Ulrika. This automatically put her up for eviction for the first week. The housemates were to win two tokens for completing the task, but lost one, see punishments below. |
| Day 2 | Punishments | A token that was won in the task was taken away from the housemates because La Toya went into Terry's private room earlier in the day. |
| Day 3 | Tasks | The task on Day 3 had housemates showcase their talents that made them famous to Head of House Terry. He chose Lucy as the least talented housemate stating she didn't impress him at all and her routine was boring. He also stated that he hadn't heard of her before she went in the house. |
| Day 4 | Tasks | For the task, housemates had to pair up and act like one another for an hour. The pairs were Tommy/La Toya, Michelle/Lucy, Coolio/Verne, Tina/Mutya, Ben/Ulrika. Housemates passed the task and, as a reward, Terry won a Thai takeaway meal. |
| Day 5 | Nominations | Terry had to nominate the housemate he thought had the least integrity, he chose Ben who joined Ulrika and Lucy being up for eviction. Ulrika, Lucy and Ben were put into a secret room as all other housemates apart from Terry had to vote for the 1 housemate per person they wanted to save from the eviction the majority saved Ben meaning Lucy and Ulrika faced eviction this week. |
| Day 6 | Tasks | For this week's shopping task, housemates had to take part in 5 tasks associated with the rich and famous. Ben & Michelle had to become a celebrity couple in a task that tests their ability to work together. Verne and Ulrika had to perform a cover version of "Endless Love" as Lionel Richie and Diana Ross. La Toya and Tommy had to become contestants on a reality TV series and learn ice-skating from a DVD. Tina, Lucy and Coolio had to become members of the paparazzi and stake out the garden for 24 hours and photograph any non-housemate celebrities, including Michael Barrymore, Michelle Marsh, Nikki Grahame, Chesney Hawkes, Alice Barry and Rebecca Ryan who appeared over the garden wall on a crane. Mutya and Terry had to join and worship at the shrine of a celebrity cult. Housemates had to pass 3 of the 5 tasks in order to get a luxury shopping budget for the next week. However, housemates only passed 2 of the 5 set tasks, therefore they failed the task, and received a basic shopping budget of £1 per head per day. |
| Day 7 | Events | During the task which started the day before Coolio started annoying a tired Lucy causing her to leave the paparazzi area. The paparazzi did not snap Michael Barrymoore causing their section of the task to fail. Tommy and La Toya's ice skating routine was also a failure as Tommy did not perform the steps correctly. Mutya and Terry did not pass their made up cult as they did not get to the Chesney Hawkes statue several times. With these three failures the entire task was failed. |
| Day 8 | Exits | Lucy was the first housemate to be evicted from the house after receiving 57% of the public vote to evict. |
| Day 9 | Tasks | Today's task was to perform a dance routine to the Eric Prydz song "Call on Me". If the performance was deemed to be satisfactory to Big Brother's expectations, housemates would receive three tokens. The housemates passed the task and won three tokens, but due to Terry and Tina discussing nominations, Big Brother awarded the housemates with only one token. |
| Day 10 | Tasks | The task for day 10 was a Best of British quiz, in which American housemates Coolio, La Toya, and Verne dressed up in traditional British costumes, dined on British food, and studied various British topics in preparation for the quiz, where they would answer questions based on their studies. The British housemates wore lycra suits with muscle stimulator pads which they had to wear for the duration of the task, and for every question the American housemates got wrong, the British housemates would receive a mild shock. As the American housemates correctly answered thirty-five out of fifty questions (thirty was needed to pass), and as all British housemates wore their lycra suits for the duration of the tasks, housemates passed this task and earned three tokens. |
| Day 11 | Events | Housemates nominated for the first time. Michelle, Mutya, Tina and Ulrika received the most nominations and faced the public vote. |
| Day 13 | Tasks | The housemates had to pretend to be toys for this week's shopping task. Tommy and Coolio had to be cars and go to the car wash every time the song Car Wash was played. Michelle and Verne had to be bears and eat a whole pot of honey in a day. Ulrika had to become a Native American and shoot a target with a bow and arrow. Terry and Tina had to dance as ballerinas. Ben had to hide and scare someone dressed as a dinosaur. Mutya and La Toya had to do a dance routine on a giant piano. Also when the sound of children laughing was played into the House, housemates had to get into a large toy box in the dining area in less than 1 minute. Then a group of children ran around the House and the housemates had to stay still until they left. Housemates failed this task, and received a basic shopping budget for another week. |
| Day 15 | Exits | Tina was the second housemate to be evicted from the house after receiving 39% of the public vote to evict. After her eviction survival, Mutya walked from the house. She left at approximately 11.40pm. |
| Day 17 | Tasks | The housemates were each given 3 chillis to eat. For each chilli they ate they were awarded a treat for the party later that day. Housemates nearly got all the luxury items for the party. |
| Day 17 | Events | Housemates nominated for the second time. Michelle and Ulrika received the most nominations and faced the public vote. |
| Day 18 | Tasks | For today's task, housemates were to create Big Brother: The Movie, which was a recap of major events that happened over the past two weeks. They were then treated to a red carpet premiere later on that day, unaware that the screening was used as a ruse for a surprise eviction.; For no reason whatsoever, Big Brother required the housemates to do peculiar tasks until further notice. Tommy had to stand upside down on one arm, Ulrika could only speak in Swedish, La Toya had to repeat whatever anyone said to her, Coolio and Terry had to cuddle, and La Toya, Ben, Michelle, Ulrika, and Verne had to walk backwards. |
| Day 18 | Exits | Whilst watching the premiere of Big Brother: The Movie, Davina interrupted the screening of the film for a surprise eviction, and announced that Michelle became the third housemate to be evicted from the house after receiving 67% of the public vote to evict. |
| Day 20 | Tasks | Housemates were asked to complete Big Brother dares, if they passed these dares they would receive a token and if they failed the penalty would be going to jail. Tommy was the only housemate to fail, therefore they won 6 tokens. |
| Day 20 | Exits | La Toya was the fourth housemate to be evicted from the house after receiving 6.6% of the public vote to win.; Tommy was the fifth housemate to be evicted from the house after receiving 9.2% of the public vote to win. |
| Day 21 | Events | Big Brother rewarded the housemates with one final party to celebrate their last full day inside the Big Brother House. |
| Day 22 | Exits | Ben left the house in fifth place. Verne left the house in fourth place. Coolio left the house in third place. Ulrika was announced as the winner, leaving Terry as the runner-up. |

== Production ==
=== Eye logo ===
The logo remains the same as the eye from Big Brother 9, except with the star located in the centre.

=== Sponsorship ===
The sixth season was sponsored by bed retailer Dreams.

=== House ===
The house used was the one from Big Brother 2008 and was largely unchanged, aside from a few minor modifications. Some of the wall panels near the stairs were modified to include stars in them to go with the format of the series. As the housemates entered the house there was a welcome pack available for housemates to read. The floor pattern in the basic bedroom were changed from the red segment of the BB9 eye, to a sequence of stars, and the beds were larger and more comfortable than in BB9. There was also a sign saying "You don't have to be mad to live here....but it helps" on one of the walls. The bathroom was completely gold, leaving no blue decor. The showers were closed off to give the celebrities privacy, although there were microphones in the showers. The garden house walls are now mainly blue and the pool has been taken out. The jail is now larger and includes a bench and mirror. A new heated sitting area was put in place and there appeared to be no spa or pool replacement. The smoking area, which contained a wall with dolls' faces with no eyes on, was moved for protection against the elements. The living area remained largely unchanged apart from some added weights and gym equipment. A specially designated entrance for housemate Verne was located to the side of the main door. This door does not have stairs.

== Ratings ==
All ratings are taken from BARB.

Official viewers (millions)
| | Week 1 | | Week 2 | Week 3 |
|---|---|---|---|---|
| Saturday | | 2.99 | 2.41 | 2.33 |
| Sunday | | 3.1 | 2.44 | 2.46 |
| Monday | | 3.57 | 2.36 | 2.04 |
| Monday | | 3.57 | 2.36 | 3.42 |
| Tuesday | | 3.29 | 3.23 | 2.71 |
| Tuesday | | 2.33 | 3.23 | 2.71 |
| Wednesday | | 3.17 | 3.01 | 2.58 |
| Wednesday | | 3.17 | 3.01 | 3.2 |
| Thursday | | 3.09 | 2.6 | 2.84 |
| Friday | 5.9 | 3.75 | 3.43 | 3.29 |
| Friday | 5.9 | 2.76 | 2.68 | 3.65 |
| Weekly average | 3.4 | | 2.77 | 2.85 |
| Running average | 3.4 | | 3.12 | 3.02 |
| Series average | 3.02 | | | |
blue-coloured boxes denote live shows.
