= Huffty =

British television presenter

- Born: Andrea Huftika Reah c.1966 Whitley Bay, Northumberland, England

Andrea Huftika Reah, better known as Huffty, sometime credited as Huffty Riah or miscredited as Huffy Reah, is a British television personality. She was a presenter of Channel 4's 1990s television series, The Word. In his autobiography My Word, host Terry Christian said that Huffty, a Catholic lesbian from Whitley Bay who is listed in the alumni of Whitley Bay High School, was a "nice girl" and "not suited to the cut and thrust" of television.

Prior to presenting The Word, she had been part of the cabaret duo Boo, was a youth worker, and acted in two stage plays.

Huffty presented the show for only one series but achieved popular recognition. She also appeared on the Harry Hill show in the late 1990s.

She appeared in Geordie Finishing School for Girls on BBC Three in July 2011.

== Filmography ==
Film and television
Year	Title	Role	Notes
1989	Women in Tropical Places	Charmaine	As actor
1991	Saturday Night Out	Self	Episode "Suddenly Last Summer"
1993–1994	The Word	Self	As presenter
1998	Harry Hill	Self	
2011	Geordie Finishing School for Girls	Self	
