= Sally Anne Marsh =

British actress and singer

- Occupations: Actress, singer
- Years active: 1988–2011

Sally Anne Marsh is a British actress and singer. She was a member of Faith Hope & Charity, later becoming the vocalist for a number of groups, including Xpansions, Ariel and Hysterix. Her film credits include The Princess and the Goblin and A Monkey's Tale, and she also appeared in a number of TV productions.

== Performing career ==
Sally Anne Marsh began singing when she was six, and acted in the children TV show Tricky Business as a teenager. She was a member of a short lived girlband with Diana Barrand and Dani Behr called Faith Hope & Charity.

After Faith Hope and Charity, her musical career included being the vocalist for electronic music group Xpansions whose major techno hit single Move Your Body (Elevation) reached Number 7 in 1991. This song was remixed and rereleased several times over the nineties. Marsh then became the lead singer of deConstruction house group Ariel who were formed by Tom Rowlands of The Chemical Brothers with whom she appeared on Channel 4's The Word. She recorded two promo only singles working with producers Mike Stock & Matt Aitken in 1995 on their Love This Records label. These were a cover of the Mungo Jerry hit "In the Summertime" and a dance version of "Windmills of your Mind". After this, she worked as lead vocalist for the London band Brand Violet.

In addition to her musical career, she is a freelance voiceover artiste who does work for GCap Media and EMAP radio, as well as the Tindle Radio Group.

As an actress, she has appeared in children's programmes as many characters including Vicky in Bodger and Badger (in which she played a drumkit), Nurse Kitty in Hilltop Hospital, Lucy in BBC's Tricky Business, Princess Irene in The Princess and the Goblin, Gina in A Monkey's Tale, Giselle in Santa and the Tooth Fairies and its sequel TV series Tales of the Tooth Fairies and Cecile Lefevre in Grange Hill. Sally Ann Marsh also voiced the character of Snow White in the 2006 Picha production of Snow White: The Sequel.

== Singles ==
- Xpansions – Move Your Body (Elevation) (Arista Records) – 1990 – Frontwoman
- Ariel – Let it Slide! (deConstruction Records – 1993)
- Xpansions – Move Your Body '95 (Arista Records) – 1995
- Sally Anne Marsh – "In the Summertime" [Promo Only] – 1995)
- Sally Anne Marsh – Windmills Of Your Mind [Promo Only] – 1995
- Aurora – Hear You Calling (Original Mother Earth) – 1999 – Vocals
- Brand Violet – Alien Hive Theme (Brand Violet Limited) – 2004 – Lead Vocals
- Brand Violet – Head (Brand Violet Limited) – 2004
- Brand Violet – Voodoo (Brand Violet Limited) – 2004
- Brand Violet – Sputnik Bride EP (Brand Violet Limited) – 2005
- Brand Violet – Legend of Ladybeard (Brand Violet Limited) – 2005

=== Faith Hope & Charity ===
For the group, see Faith Hope & Charity

== Albums ==
- Brand Violet – Retrovision Coma (Brand Violet Limited) – 2004 (Lead vocalist)
- Brand Violet – Akathisia (Brand Violet Limited) – 2005

== Filmography ==
Year	Title	Role	Notes
1988	Turkey Love	Additional voice	Television film
1989	Tricky Business	Lucy	9 episodes
1991	The Princess and the Goblin	Princess Irene (voice)	
1991	Santa and the Tooth Fairies	Additional voice	English dub
1993	Tale of the Tooth Fairies	Additional voice	English dub
1996	Grange Hill	Cecile Lefevre	8 episodes
1996–1997	Bodger and Badger	Vicky	9 episodes
1999	A Monkey's Tale	Gina	English dub
1999	Hilltop Hospital	Nurse Kitty	Voice
2000	Free Spirits	Kelly	
2007	Snow White: The Sequel	Snow White (voice)	English dub
2011	NOKSU	NOKSU (voice)	
