= Manchester Arena =

Indoor arena in Manchester, England

Manchester Arena AO Arena

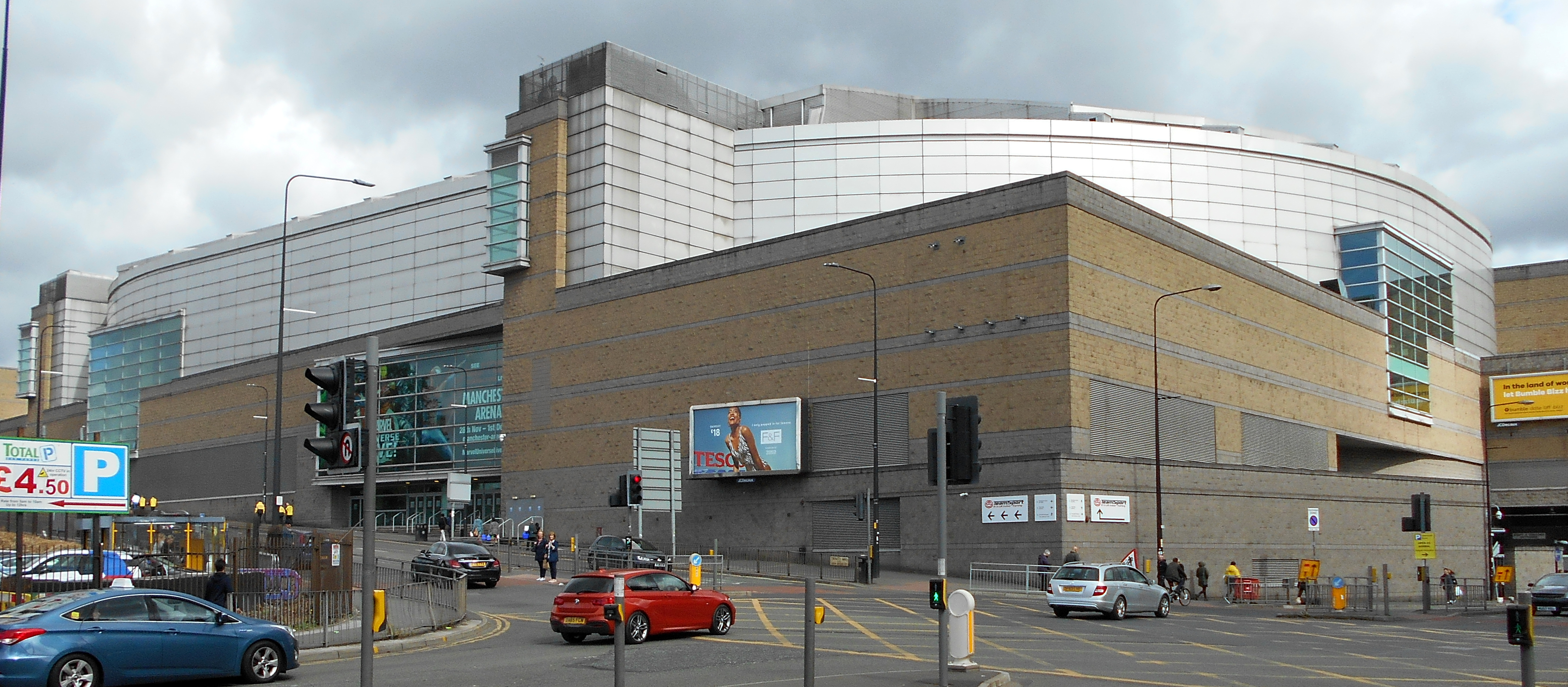
- Exterior of the arena in 2019, seen from the north
- Former names: NYNEX Arena (1995–1998); Manchester Evening News Arena (1998–2011); Phones 4u Arena (2013–2015); Manchester Arena (2012–2013, 2015–2020)
- Address: Victoria Station; Manchester; M3 1AR
- Location: Manchester, England
- Coordinates: 53°29′17″N 2°14′38″W
- Owner: Mansford
- Operator: ASM Global
- Capacity: 23,000
- Public transit: Manchester Victoria

Construction
- Groundbreaking: March 1993
- Opened: 15 July 1995
- Closed: 22 May 2017 (Note: Temporarily closed for forensic investigation and repair work due to the Manchester Arena bombing. Events scheduled to take place were either cancelled or moved to alternative venues.)
- Reopened: 9 September 2017
- Cost: £52 million (£112 million in 2025 pounds)
- Architects: DLA Design, Austin-Smith:Lord and Ellerbe Becket
- Structural engineer: Ove Arup & Partners

Tenants
- Manchester Giants (BBL) (1995–2001); Manchester Storm (BISL, BJL) (1995–2002); Manchester Phoenix (EIHL) (2003–2004); Manchester Storm (EIHL) (2026–present)

Website
- Venue Website

Manchester Arena (currently known as AO Arena for sponsorship reasons) is an indoor arena in Manchester, England, immediately north of the city centre and partly above Manchester Victoria railway station in air rights space. With a capacity of 23,000 it is the second largest indoor arena in the UK after Co-op Live and third largest in Europe.

The arena is one of the world's busiest indoor arenas, hosting music and sporting events such as boxing and swimming. The arena was a key part of Manchester's bids to host the Olympic Games in 1996 and 2000 and was eventually used for the 2002 Commonwealth Games.

On 22 May 2017, the arena's foyer was the scene of a terrorist attack carried out by a suicide bomber, in which 22 people were killed and 1,017 injured following an Ariana Grande concert.

== Arena design ==
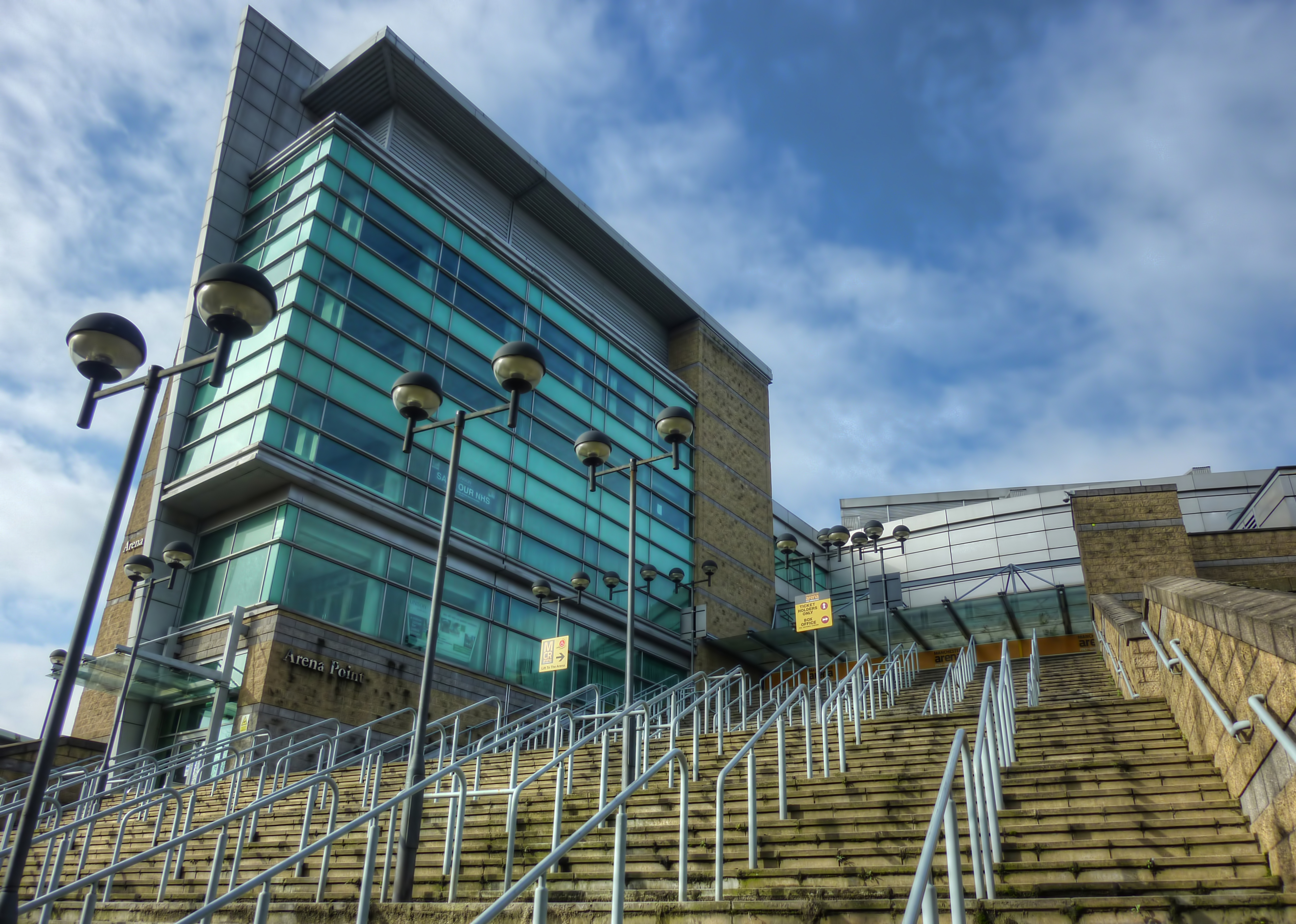
Steps leading to southern entrance from Hunts Bank

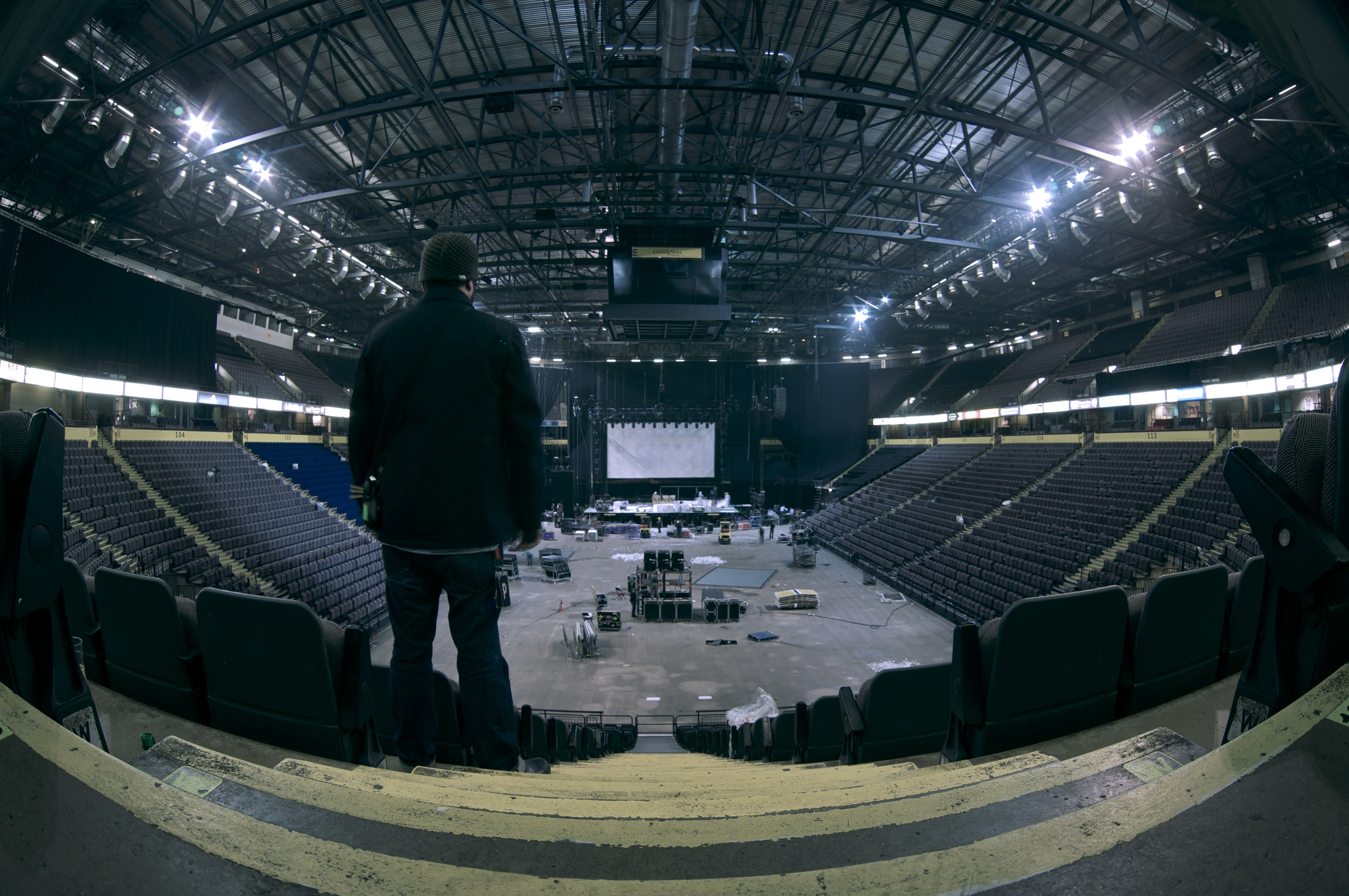
Panorama of the arena, facing the main stage

First proposed during the regeneration of Manchester city centre during the 1980s, the structure was designed by DLA Ellerbe Beckett, Ove Arup & Partners and Austin-Smith:Lord. The arena is sited in air rights space over the Manchester Victoria railway station and was constructed without disrupting use of the station. The original plans included a glass tower which was not built. It originally hosted a seven-screen multiplex cinema called Arena 7, in addition to the multi-purpose arena and multi-storey parking. The former multiplex cinema, which opened in 1996, closed after just four years and was renovated when the arena's call centre moved in. In 2017, the foyer underwent renovation.

A large truss measuring 105 metres (344 ft) spans the roof. Reinforced concrete is used to increase sound insulation. The upper parts of the building are clad in purple-grey with green glass. The arena was opened on 15 July 1995.

The arena is the only indoor venue in the UK to be built following a layout of 360-degree seating. (London's The O2, formerly the Millennium Dome, also has 360-degree seating, but only on its lower tier, whereas Manchester's arena features it on both tiers). Other European indoor venues built to the same concept include the Lanxess Arena (Cologne, Germany), Arena Zagreb (Zagreb, Croatia), Spaladium Arena (Split, Croatia), Kombank Arena (Belgrade, Serbia), O2 Arena (Prague, Czech Republic), and the Barclaycard Arena (Hamburg, Germany).

A scoreboard was also hung from the arena roof upon opening, and remained in situ for several years after it was deactivated until it was removed.

A three-year £50 million re-development started in 2022. The arena's capacity will increase to 24,000, and new public entrances and custom lounges will be opened. Once complete, the increase in capacity will retain the indoor arena's place as the largest in the city after the 23,500-seat Co-op Live Arena opened.

== Background ==
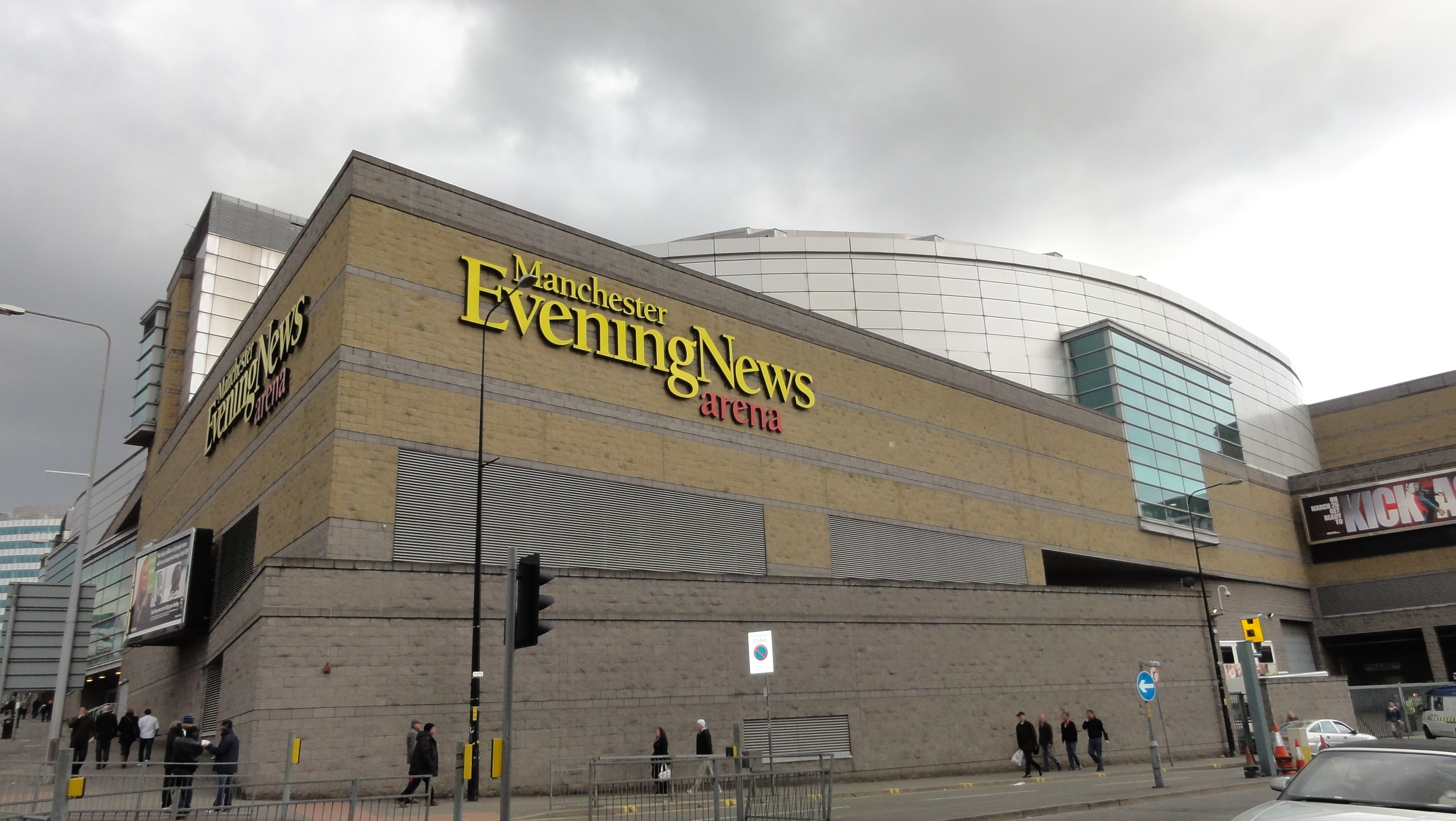
The arena during sponsorship by the Manchester Evening News (MEN)

Phones 4u Arena logo used from 2013 to 2015

The arena was constructed as part of the city's unsuccessful bid for the 2000 Summer Olympics. Construction cost £52 million of which £35.5m was provided by government grants and £2.5m from the European Regional Development Fund. Although built as an American style sports arena, it has been more successful hosting large music events.

The arena opened in July 1995, sponsored by NYNEX CableComms as NYNEX Arena. In July 1998, it was renamed the Manchester Evening News Arena, or just the MEN Arena, when it was sponsored by the Manchester Evening News newspaper. In December 2011, the newspaper ended its 13 year sponsorship, and the arena was renamed Manchester Arena in January 2012. In July 2013, the arena was renamed Phones 4u Arena after the mobile phone company Phones 4u, but this deal ended in January 2015 after Phones 4u went out of business, renaming the arena back to Manchester Arena. In September 2020, the arena was rebranded as the AO Arena as part of a five year sponsorship deal by the online electricals retailer AO.

On the opening night, 15,000 spectators watched Jayne Torvill and Christopher Dean perform. The crowd was a record for an ice event. Attendance records were set in 1997 when 17,425 people watched Manchester Storm play Sheffield Steelers, a record for an ice hockey match in Europe at that time. When 14,151 people watched Manchester Giants play London Leopards, it set a British record for attendance at a basketball match. The venue attracts over a million customers each year for concerts and family shows, making it one of the world's busiest indoor arenas, and was named "International Venue Of The Year" in 2002 in the 'Pollstar' awards, and was nominated in the same category from 2002 to 2009. The arena was named "Busiest Arena Venue In The World", based on ticket sales for concerts from 2003 to 2007, ahead of other indoor arenas including Madison Square Garden and Wembley Arena. The arena was the 'World's Busiest Arena' from 2001 until 2007 based on ticket sales for concerts, attracting five and a half million customers. It was voted 'Europe's Favourite Arena' at the TPi Awards in 2008 by the touring companies that bring the shows to the venue.

On the evening of 27 May 1999, a reception was held at the arena to celebrate Manchester United's UEFA Champions League triumph in Barcelona 24 hours earlier, following the victorious side's parade around Manchester at the end of the season in which they became the first English team to win the treble of the Premier League, FA Cup and Champions League in the same season, which remained the case until Manchester City achieved the same feat in 2022-23.

In 2008, the arena was the world's third busiest arena behind London's The O2 Arena and New York's Madison Square Garden. In 2009, it was the world's second busiest arena behind The O2, and ahead of the Sportpaleis in Antwerp and Madison Square Garden in New York City. Although second to London's The O2, Manchester's arena had its busiest year with over 1,500,000 people attending concerts and family shows. The arena hosts over 250 events annually including comedy, live music and tours, sporting events, and occasionally musicals.

== Events ==
=== Music ===
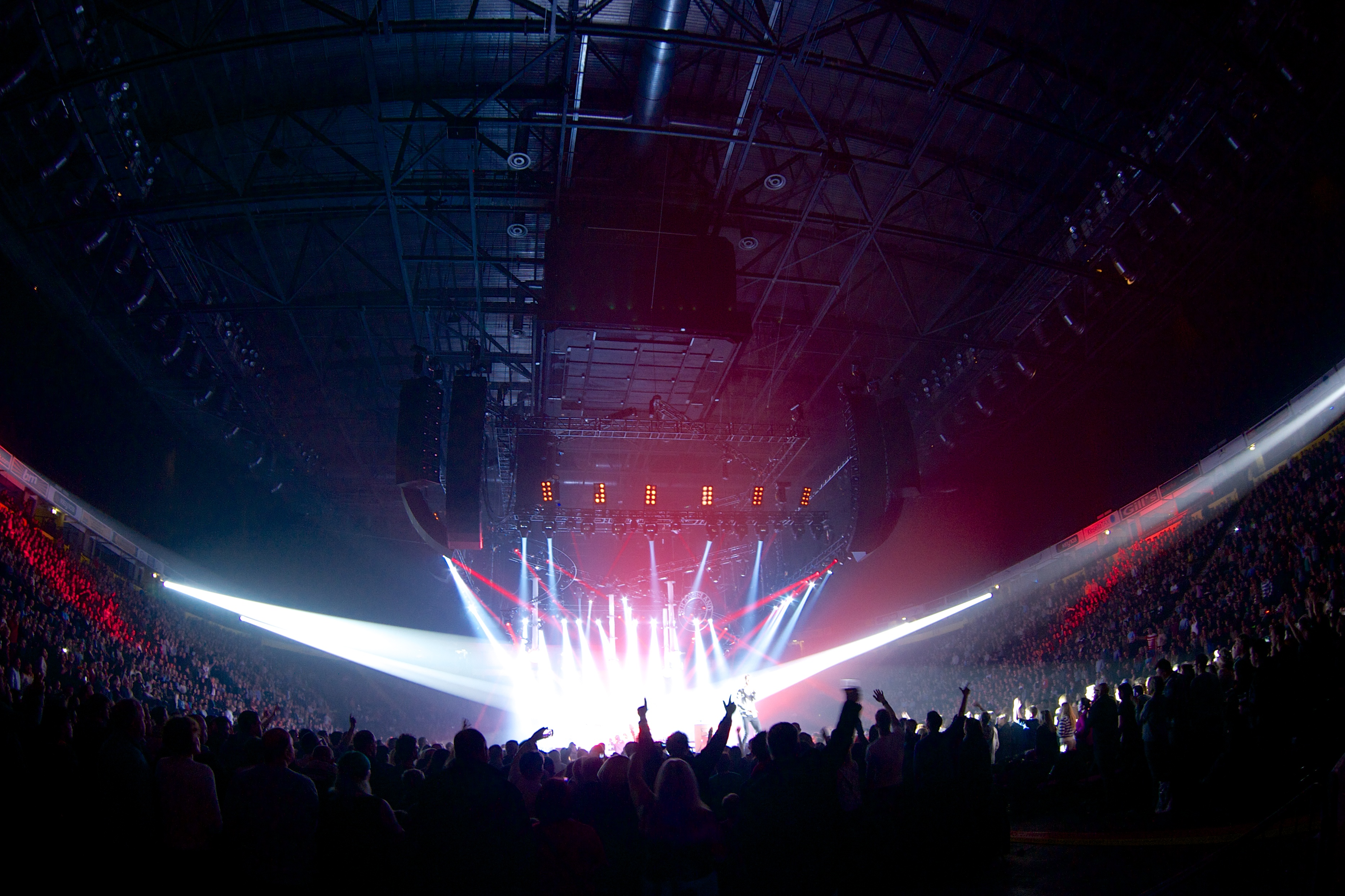
Arena during a concert

As one of the largest venues in the UK, the arena has hosted music concerts since opening in 1995.

As of 2019, British pop group Take That, who were formed in Manchester, hold the record for the most performances, with 46. During the five-concert Manchester leg of their 2019 tour, the arena was temporarily renamed after the band to honour their 30-year career. Irish pop group Westlife previously held the record with 33 performances.

Spice Girls performed 4 sold-out shows during their Spiceworld Tour in April 1998, 4 sold-out shows in December 1999 on the Christmas in Spiceworld Tour, and 3 sold-out shows in January 2008 on The Return of the Spice Girls World Tour.

Led Zeppelin legends Jimmy Page and Robert Plant performed a sell out concert at the arena on 3 November 1998 as part of their Walking into Clarksdale tour.

On 26 March 2000, English boy band Five performed at this venue as part of their Invincible Tour. The show was also filmed for a concert special called Five Live that was released on DVD and VHS later that same year.

Janet Jackson performed here on 31 May 1998 as part of her The Velvet Rope Tour. Jackson was scheduled to perform during her All for You Tour on 5 December 2001, but the show was cancelled with the rest of her European tour because of possible terrorist threats. Her 2016 Unbreakable World Tour was also cancelled, this time because of scheduling conflicts.

Britney Spears performed at the arena for the first time for two sold-out shows on 13 and 14 October 2000 during her Oops!...I Did It Again Tour. She has returned for additional sold-out shows on 1 May 2004 during Onyx Hotel Tour, 17 June 2009 during her Circus Tour, in 2011 for the Femme Fatale Tour, and on 18 August 2018 as part of her Piece of Me Tour.

U2 performed at the arena on 11 and 12 August 2001, for their Elevation Tour. The band came back in 2018 during their Experience + Innocence Tour for two shows on 19 and 20 October.

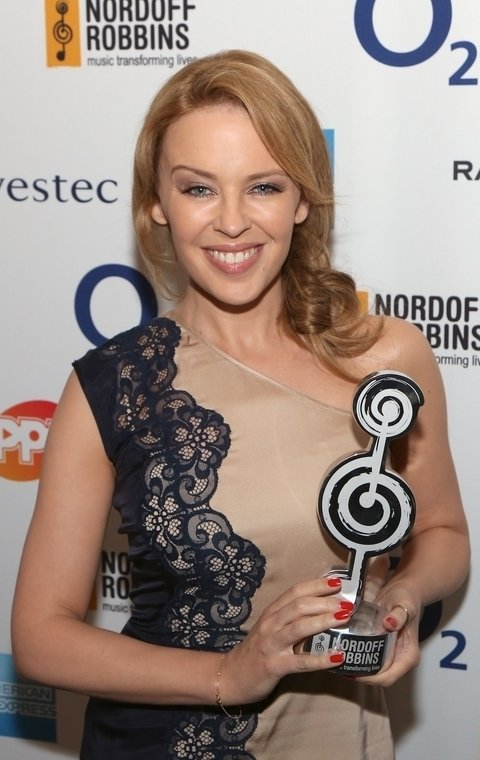
After breaking her own record, Kylie Minogue still holds the record for the most performances as a female artist in the arena's history (33).

In 2002, Kylie Minogue performed for six shows as part of her KylieFever2002 tour. She returned for five sold-out shows in April 2005 as part of her Showgirl: The Greatest Hits Tour. In 2007, she performed for seven sold-out shows in January as part of her Showgirl: The Homecoming Tour. In 2008, she returned for six sold-out shows in July as part of her KylieX2008 tour. Minogue performed for four shows in April 2011 as part of her Aphrodite: Les Folies Tour. Minogue performed again at the arena on 26 September 2014. The performance marked the 30th time Minogue has performed at the arena. It is a record for Minogue as the venue she has played to most in the world; she has played to 400,000 fans in total in the Manchester Arena.

American entertainer Beyoncé performed three sold-out shows at the arena as part of her The Mrs. Carter Show World Tour on 7, 8 and 9 May 2013. She returned on 25 and 26 February 2014 for two more sold-out shows. Both shows became the fastest concert to sell out the entire arena. This was the sixth tour Beyoncé has performed at the arena, following concerts for her Destiny's Child World Tour (2002), Dangerously in Love Tour (2003), Destiny Fulfilled...and Lovin' It (2005), The Beyoncé Experience (2007) and the I Am... World Tour (2009).

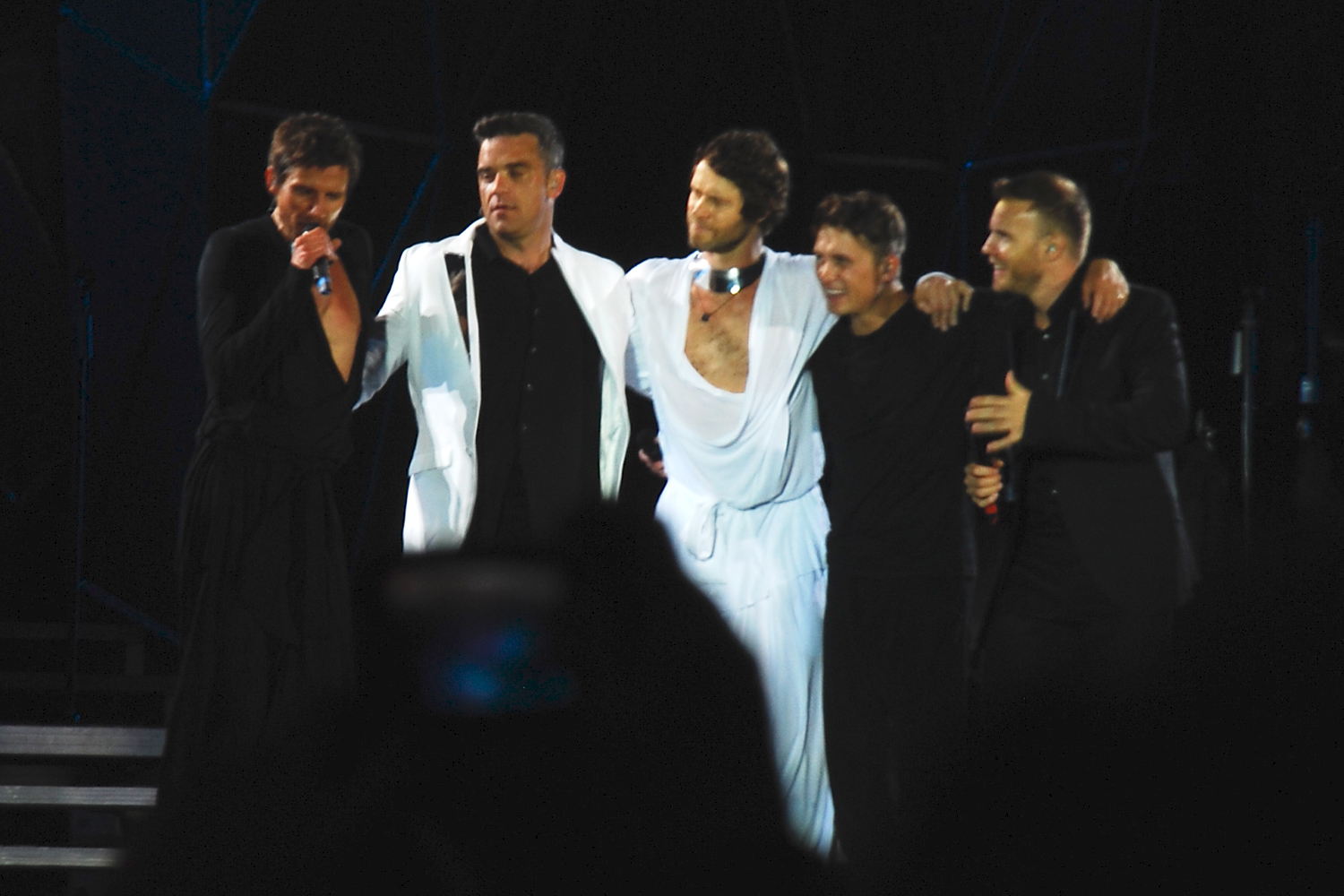
Take That has performed at the Arena a record 38 times.

Barbadian singer Rihanna would perform her first concert in England here, as part of her worldwide Good Girl Gone Bad Tour that ran September 2007 to January 2009, starting and ending in North America. The full concert, named Good Girl Gone Bad Live was released on DVD and Blu-ray on 9 June 2008, by Def Jam Recordings. The concert promoted the songs from the album of the same name, and also featured songs from Rihanna's two previous albums Music of the Sun (2005) and A Girl like Me (2006).

Madonna performed twice on her Re-Invention World Tour in Summer 2004, returning in 2009, on the second leg of the Sticky & Sweet Tour. Two shows were planned but one was cancelled for unknown reasons. Madonna was late on stage in 2015 on the Rebel Heart Tour due to problems with the screen visuals resulting in a shortened set. In October 2023 the singer booked this arena to perform the final rehearsals prior to the kick-off of her Celebration Tour, set to begin in London on 14 October the same year.

Lady Gaga performed there three nights for her Monster Ball Tour February 18, June 2 & June 3 in 2010. Later brought her Born This Way Ball, ArtRave: The Artpop Ball. She was scheduled to play on February 6, 2018, but the date was cancelled due to health issues.

Pop/R&B singer Whitney Houston would hold her last concerts ever here, 16 & 17 June 2010 on her Nothing But Love World Tour. Houston died 11 February 2012, at age 48.

On 12 December 2006 comedy rock duo Tenacious D performed as part of their Pick of Destiny Tour, Neil Hamburger was opening act. Tenacious D also performed on 8 May 2024 as part of The Spicy Meatball Tour.

In July 2010, the arena celebrated its 15th birthday with a multi-artist gig, presented by Real Radio (North West).

Gorillaz performed at the arena on 12 November 2010 during their Escape to Plastic Beach Tour, and came back on 1 December 2017, as part of their Humanz Tour.

Coldplay performed a sold-out show at the arena on 4 December 2011 as part of their Mylo Xyloto Tour.

In 2014, Katy Perry performed twice at the venue, on 20 and 24 May as part of her third concert tour, Prismatic World Tour.

Taylor Swift performed at the arena on 24 June 2015, as part of her fourth concert tour, The 1989 World Tour.

Adele performed at the arena during her world tour on 7, 8 March and 10, 11 March 2016.

Olly Murs performed at the arena on 17 and 18 March 2017, as part of the first leg for his new UK tour, Spring & Summer Tour 2017.

Shawn Mendes performed at the arena on 18 April 2017 as the second date of the Illuminate World Tour. He also performed on 7 April 2019 as part of his self-titled tour.

Ariana Grande performed at the arena on 22 May 2017 as part of the Dangerous Woman Tour. After this, a suicide bombing took place at the foyer of the arena.

The arena was reopened by Noel Gallagher's High Flying Birds and a cohort of local stars such as The Courteeners, Blossoms, Rick Astley and comedian Peter Kay as part of the "We Are Manchester" event on 9 September 2017.

Metallica performed at the arena on 28 October 2017 in front of 19,423 people, as a part of their WorldWired Tour.

On 29 November 2017, Phil Collins performed one night here with his Not Dead Yet Tour.

On 10 December 2017, Mariah Carey brought her All I Want for Christmas Is You, A Night of Joy and Festivity show here.

On 16 December 2017, Liam Gallagher performed here as part of his UK tour to celebrate the release of his debut album As You Were.

On 10 February 2018, Kendrick Lamar performed the 3rd date of the European leg of The Damn Tour. This was his first time performing in Manchester since 2013.

On 22 June 2018, Katy Perry performed the 90th show of her fourth concert tour Witness: The Tour.

South Korean girl group Blackpink performed their first UK arena concert on 21 May 2019 as part of the Blackpink World Tour (In Your Area) schedule here.

Carrie Underwood bought her Cry Pretty Tour 360 to the arena on 3 July 2019.

Six time Grammy award-winning artist Christina Aguilera performed her 14th date of The X Tour to full attendance on 12 November 2019.

On 15 April 2022, Dua Lipa performed the first date of the European leg of highly anticipated Future Nostalgia Tour. This was her first time performing in Manchester since 2016.

On 7 and 8 May 2022, Little Mix performed three shows at the arena; two evening shows and one matinée, one of their three matinée shows on The Confetti Tour.

Billie Eilish played here for two consecutive nights on July 7 & 8 2022 as part of her Happier Than Ever: The World Tour

Panic! at the Disco performed the final date of the project's Viva Las Vengeance Tour on 10 March 2023. It was its farewell concert, as leader Brendon Urie will subsequently disband the name to focus on family. Panic! at the Disco had previously performed at the arena on 30 March 2019 for its Pray for the Wicked Tour.

On 5 and 6 April 2023, Celine Dion was scheduled to perform at the arena during her Courage World Tour. Due to a neurological disease, she had to cancel the remainder of her tour including both shows in Manchester. During her 2017 tour, Dion planned to perform two concerts at the arena, but the shows were moved to Leeds following the arena closure in May 2017. She had previously performed at the arena on 14 November 1996 during her Falling into You: Around the World tour and on 2 and 3 May 2008 during her Taking Chances World Tour.

On 10 and 15 November rapper 50 Cent performed at the arena as part of his The Final Lap Tour with Busta Rhymes as opening act.

Hong Kong boy group Mirror performed their second UK arena concert on 14 March 2024 as part of the Feel The Passion Concert Tour 2024

Queens of the Stone Age played at the arena as part of their The End Is Nero tour on 14 November 2023.

On 30 January 2025, Ateez held a solo concert at the venue for their Towards The Light: Will To Power world tour.

On 18 March 2025, the arena hosted Taemin's first ever world tour, called "Ephemeral Gaze".

On 18 March 2026, Reneé Rapp played here as part of her Bite Me Tour.

On 9 May 2026, Conan Gray performed here as part of his Wishbone World Tour.

=== Sport ===
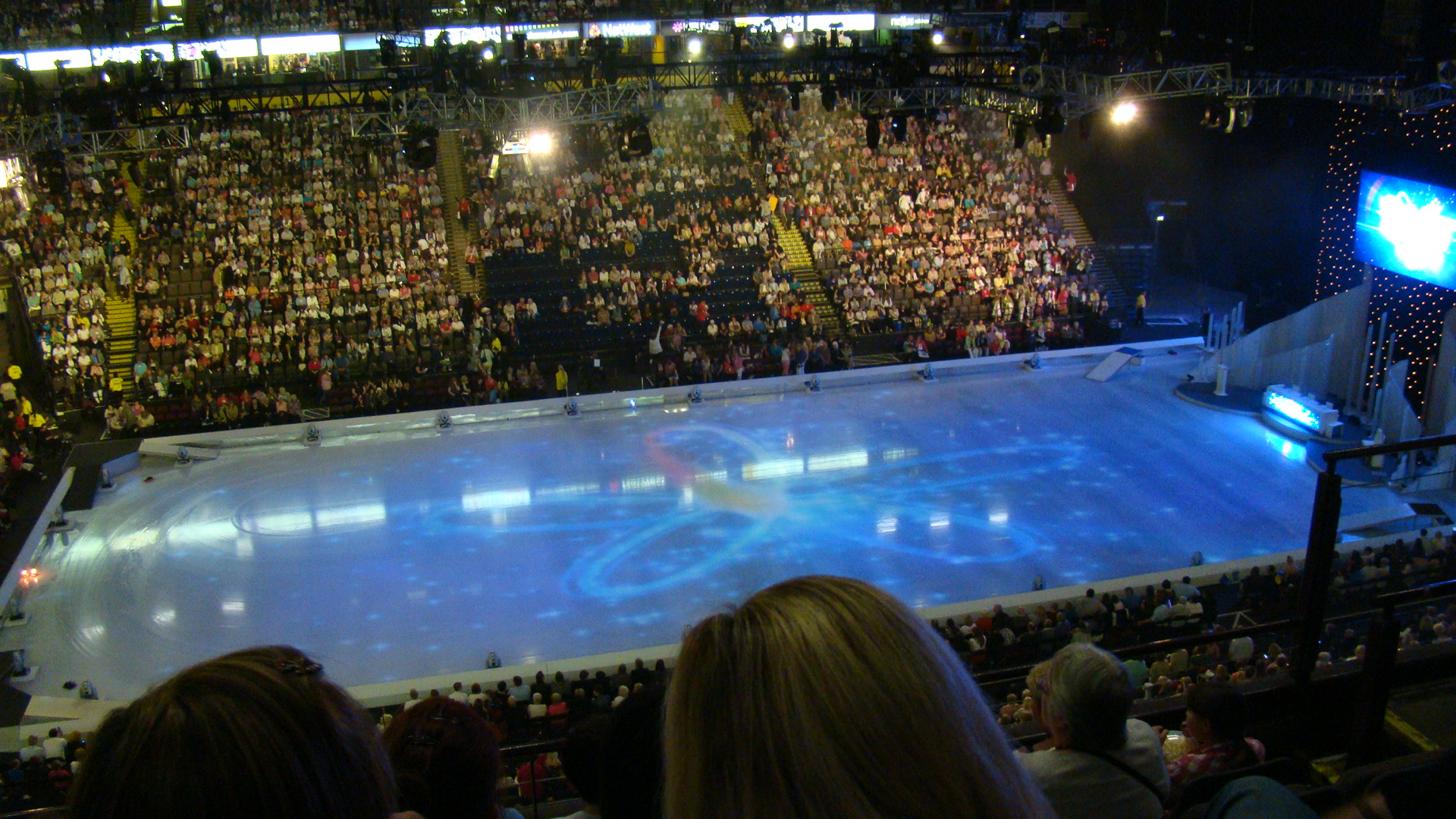
The arena in ice skating configuration

The arena has been the home of three sports teams: the Manchester Storm and Manchester Phoenix ice hockey teams, and the Manchester Giants basketball team with limited success, and is also used for one-off sporting events such as boxing and football masters.

Many boxers have had bouts in the arena, such as Amir Khan, Jermaine Johnson, Ricky Hatton, Joe Calzaghe, Mike Tyson, and David Haye. Hatton, from Manchester, became a regular and favourite at the arena. American professional wrestling promotion WWE have regularly hosted both live events and TV tapings at the Arena, including Mayhem in Manchester in 1998, pay-per-view events such as the UK version of No Mercy in 1999, and Rebellion in 2001 and 2002. On November 7, 2017, the arena hosted an episode of Friday Night Smackdown that saw AJ Styles defeat Jinder Mahal to win the WWE Championship. This marked the first time that the title had changed hands outside of North America.

The arena hosted mixed martial arts events. UFC 70: Nations Collide on 21 April 2007, and UFC 105: Couture vs Vera on 14 November 2009 for which it set the European record attendance for the largest UFC event outside the US with 16,000 spectators. The arena also hosted UFC Fight Night: Machida vs. Munoz on 26 October 2013 as well as UFC 204: Bisping vs. Henderson 2 on 8 October 2016, headlining was a middleweight championship match between Dan Henderson and Michael Bisping. The World Taekwondo Qualification Event for the Beijing Olympic Games was held there on 28–30 September 2007 when 103 countries competed for 24 places at the Beijing Olympic Games in 2008. In April 2008, the arena hosted the FINA Short Course World Swimming Championships, the first time the event has been held in the UK. The arena was transformed with two 25 m swimming pools constructed in 18 days and seating provided for 17,250 spectators. On 26 February 2011, it played host to BAMMA 5.

Monster truck racing events have been staged but the floor space has to be extended and the front section of seating in the lower tier removed. The American league Monster Jam attended the venue for the first time in 2005 during the European Tour. They would not attend again for over ten years until 2019 when a second show took place.

Since 2008, it has played host to a week of the Premier League Darts.

In May 2011, the arena hosted a basketball contest between the Atlanta Dream (WNBA) and the Great Britain women's basketball team, billed as "WNBA Live", the first time a WNBA team had played in Europe. In July 2012, the arena hosted an international between Great Britain men's basketball team and the United States men's basketball team in the buildup to the 2012 Summer Olympics.

In early April 2018, the revamped Dancing on Ice tour performed at the venue.

On 25 August 2018, a boxing match between KSI and Logan Paul was held at the arena. The match was live streamed via pay-per-view on YouTube.

On 15–19 May 2019, the arena hosted the 2019 World Taekwondo Championships.

On 12-17 September 2023, the arena hosted all Group B matches of the 2023 Davis Cup Finals, in which Great Britain participated.

On 14 October 2023, KSI and Logan Paul returned to the arena fighting a double main event, with KSI taking on the brother of Tyson Fury and WBC Diriyah Champion, Tommy Fury, and Logan Paul taking on Dillon Danis.

From 10 to 15 September 2024, the arena hosted all Group D matches of the 2024 Davis Cup Finals, in which Great Britain was participating.

On 27 April 2026, Manchester Storm announced that they would be returning to the arena for the first time since 2002.

=== Comedy ===
The first stand-up comedy performance was Peter Kay's final performance of his Mum wants a bungalow Tour in July 2003. He worked at the arena when it opened in 1995 and the performance was filmed for DVD release as Peter Kay at the Manchester Arena. In 2005, Lee Evans set a world record for performing to the biggest audience in front of a crowd of 10,108. Peter Kay's The Tour That Doesn't Tour Tour...Now On Tour ran for 20 consecutive nights and 20 nights at the end of the tour – a record for the venue. Alan Carr filmed the DVD for Spexy Beast in Manchester.

=== Other ===
In 1998, the game show Ice Warriors was filmed on the arena's ice rink.

On July 21st & 22nd 2001, TV game show Robot Wars hosted two Live Events at the Arena, acting as Qualifiers for the upcoming Series 5.

On 19 July 2011, (with a final dress rehearsal in front of an audience on 16 July 2011) the arena hosted the world premiere of Batman Live, a touring stage show, including theatrical, circus and stage-magic elements, focused on the DC Comics superhero Batman.

The arena also hosted the annual convention of Jehovah's Witnesses. In 2014, this was held on 22–24 August.

The arena also hosted Ant & Dec's Takeaway on Tour: Live on 15–16 August 2014. Over the two days, about more than 120,000 people attended both matinee and evening shows.

On 13–15 April 2018, Universal's Fast & Furious: Live performed at the arena, as part of the tour's second UK leg.

== 2017 bombing ==
Following the Dangerous Woman Tour concert by American pop singer Ariana Grande on 22 May 2017, a suicide bombing occurred in the arena's foyer area. Greater Manchester Police confirmed twenty-three adults and children were killed, including the bomber, and 500 were injured. The terrorist group Islamic State (ISIS) claimed responsibility for the attack.

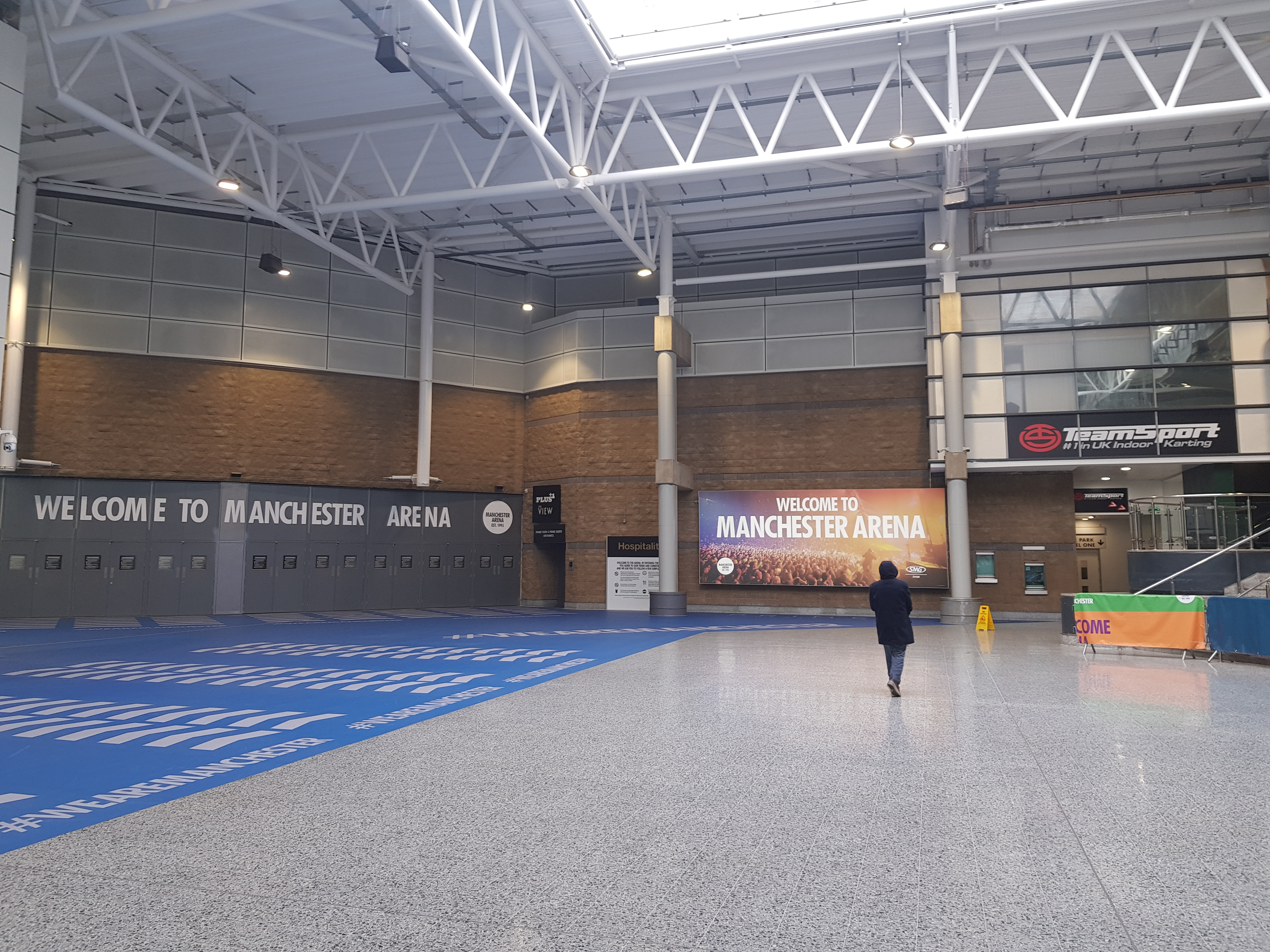
The 'City Room' foyer of the Manchester Arena. Photo taken in 2020 after the completion of the renovation works.

The arena was closed until September, with scheduled concerts either cancelled or moved to other venues. On 9 September 2017, the arena re-opened with a benefit concert featuring Noel Gallagher and other acts associated with the North West. This was broadcast live on BBC Radio Manchester, Key 103 and Radio X.

== Transport ==
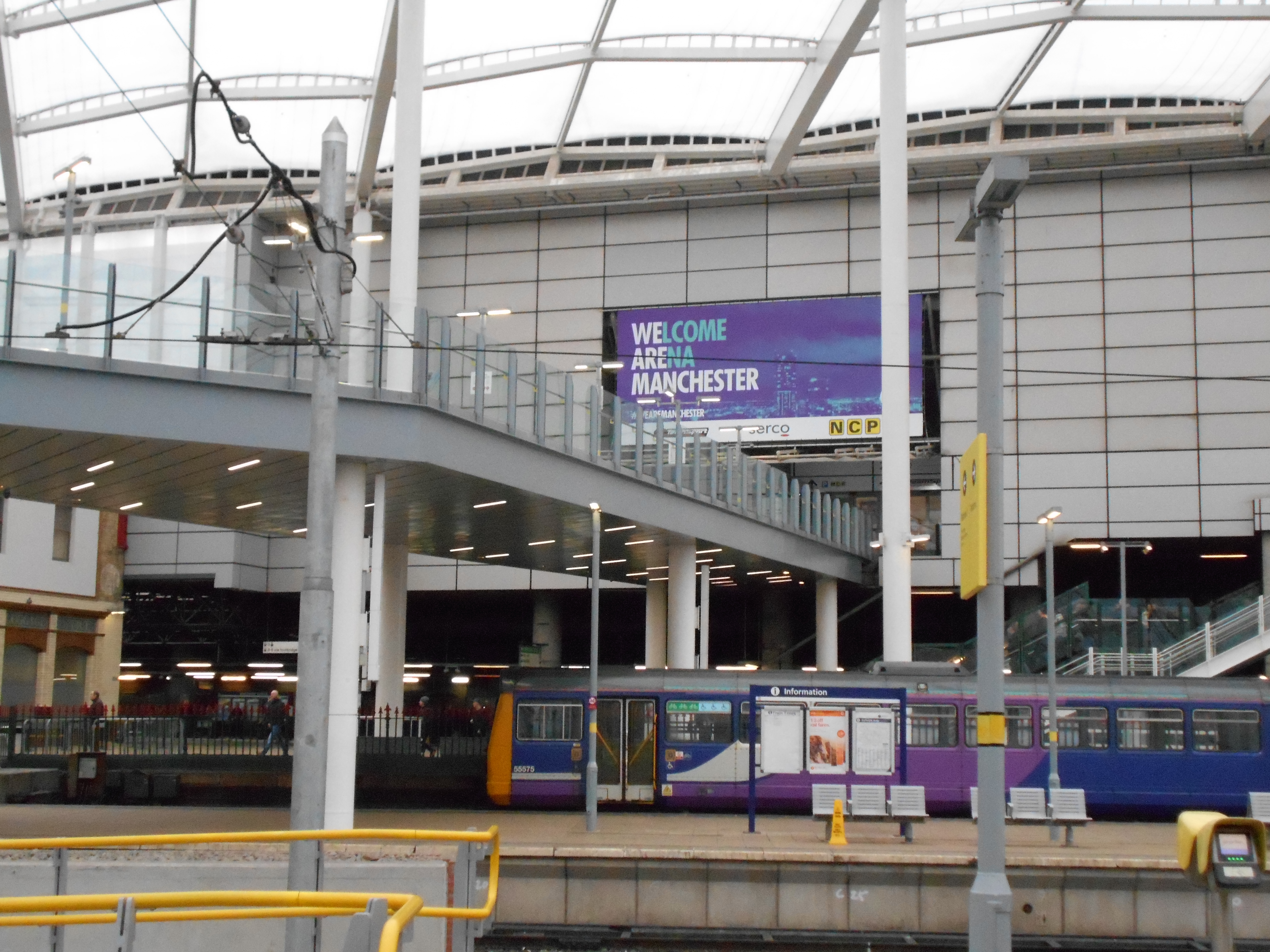
The entrance to the foyer of the arena from Victoria station

Public transport access
Manchester Metrolink	Victoria
National Rail	Victoria

The arena adjoins Manchester Victoria railway station which is served by Northern, TransPennine Express and Metrolink.

The arena car park is operated by Citipark, and has 958 standard and 65 disabled spaces.

== See also ==
- List of Commonwealth Games venues
- Manchester Central Convention Complex
- Co-op Live
- List of indoor arenas by capacity
