= Like It Is (film) =

1998 film by Paul Oremland

- Theatrical release poster
- Directed by: Paul Oremland
- Written by: Robert Gray
- Produced by: Tracey Gardiner
- Starring: Steve Bell; Ian Rose; Roger Daltrey; Dani Behr
- Cinematography: Alistair Cameron
- Edited by: Jan Langford
- Music by: Don McGlashan
- Distributed by: Dangerous to Know (UK)
- Release date: 17 April 1998
- Running time: 97 minutes
- Country: United Kingdom
- Language: English
- Box office: £6,000 (UK)

Like It Is is a 1998 British gay-themed romance film. It stars Steve Bell, Ian Rose, Roger Daltrey and Dani Behr.

== Plot summary ==
Matt (Rose) is a London music promoter who wants to one day own his own club. His flatmate is Paula (Behr), a pop singer whose music he helps promote. While accompanying her on a personal appearance at a gay club in Blackpool, Matt meets Craig (Bell), an unemployed youth who makes ends meet as a backroom bareknuckles fighter. They go back to Craig's place to have sex but it's Craig's first time and he freaks out. Matt leaves his card and takes off.

Craig wins his next fight and the fight promoter plans to put him against an opponent Craig labels a maniac. Rather than fight, Craig goes to London and finds Matt. Matt invites him to stay, but Paula's not pleased about it. Also not pleased is Kelvin (Daltrey), Matt's boss, who wants Matt to help put over his new pop group ZKC and doesn't want him distracted. Matt agrees to put the final touches on ZKC's music video in exchange for the opportunity to run Kelvin's club when it re-opens.

Meanwhile, a friend of Matt's offers Craig a staff job at his club. Unfortunately, on his first night he gets into a fight with one of the patrons. He calls Matt, who ditches a video editing session to retrieve Craig. Kelvin is livid, but invites Craig to a party at his house anyway.

The invitation is a pretext, however, to break up Matt and Craig. Kelvin offers Craig a job doing "market research" (meaning travelling around Northern England with several others, buying copies of Paula's and ZKC's new single to manipulate the pop charts) to keep him away from Matt for several weeks. He also aims Jamie, a member of ZKC, at Craig, who has a drunken one-night stand with him the night before he leaves for his job. While Craig is away, Matt learns about his fling with Jamie. Paula also acts to keep them apart, refusing to give Matt his messages from Craig.

Craig returns to London the night of a music awards show at which Paula and ZKC are scheduled to perform. Matt confronts Craig but forgives him, then has to calm down Paula, who's terrified of performing live, and Jamie. Kelvin tells Craig that he won't be needed any longer for "market research." Jamie and Matt have had a previous fling as well and, while high on cocaine, they start making out. Craig catches them and storms out. Matt catches up to him and Craig asks him to leave with him right then. Matt hesitates and Craig leaves.

Craig returns to Blackpool and agrees to take the fight. Matt, preparing for the club opening, decides to go to Blackpool after him. Kelvin fires him from the club and the record company. Matt meets Craig's brother Tony, who figures out the nature of their relationship. Tony, who just wants Craig to be happy, helps Matt find him, finally tracking him down at the fight. Craig loses badly, but he's bet all the money he made in London against himself and makes a big payday. Matt and Craig decide to give it another go.

== Cast ==
- Steve Bell as Craig
- Ian Rose as Matt
- Roger Daltrey as Kelvin
- Dani Behr as Paula
- Jude Alderson as Gloria
- Emile Charles as Aylon
- Chris Hargreaves (billed as Christopher Hargreaves) as Tony, Craig's Brother
- Paul Broughton as Minto
- P.J. Nicholas as Jamie
- Sean Simpson as Jack
- Charlie Caine as Terry, DJ
- Stephen Burke as Luke
- Dickon Tolson as Dirty Dave
- Chris Ross as Andy
- Tony Van Silva as Fight Loser
- Suzy King as Amy
- Ursula Lea as Sonya
- Suzanne Hall as Train Girl
- Jason Redshaw as Dancer in nightclub

== DVD release ==
Like It Is was released on Region 1 DVD on 7 August 1999. It was re-released 19 May 2004, along with The Wolves of Kromer and Boyfriends in a box set entitled The Best of Gay Britain.
