= Hotel Babylon (music programme) =

British late night music television show

- Genre: Late night television; Music television
- Presented by: Dani Behr
- Country of origin: United Kingdom
- Original language: English
- No. of series: 1
- No. of episodes: 24

Production
- Production companies: Planet 24; Heineken

Original release
- Network: ITV
- Release: 6 January – 29 June 1996

Hotel Babylon is a 1996 late night music programme hosted by Dani Behr, and made by LWT for the ITV network's ITV Night Time strand. It was created jointly by the production company Planet 24 & brewer Heineken. The premise of the programme is a mock hotel where musicians and bands visited, and would be invited to play in the hotel's lounge and be interviewed in the adjacent bar.

== Controversy ==
Hotel Babylon was noted as one of the first commercially associated programmes on broadcast television in the United Kingdom. This is where the sponsor not only simply sponsors the programme, which is common on commercial television, but actually has some significant control in way it is directed. This was before the rules on commercial sponsorship and product placement were liberalised in 2011.

Before the programme was about to launch, a fax from the head of the advertising department of Heineken's headquarters in the Netherlands to programme's British producers was leaked to the Independent newspaper. In the fax, it criticised the programme by saying that the programme in question didn't emphasise the company's signature products, that the studio audience was too edgy with not enough "normal people", and had too many "negroes". This caused an outrage both within the programme and outside with noted black MP Bernie Grant asking for an explanation. This led to a heavy cloud over the programme, and it only broadcast a single series.
