= Ice Warriors (game show) =

1998 British game show

- Genre: Game show
- Created by: Julian Grant; Roy Scammell
- Presented by: Dani Behr
- Announcer: Neil Fox
- Country of origin: United Kingdom
- Original language: English
- No. of series: 1
- No. of episodes: 9

Production
- Production location: Manchester Arena
- Running time: 45-60 minutes (inc. adverts)
- Production company: LWT

Original release
- Network: ITV
- Release: 24 January – 21 March 1998

Related
- Gladiators (1992 British TV series)

Ice Warriors is a British game show which aired on ITV from 24 January to 21 March 1998 and was hosted by Dani Behr. It had a similar format to Gladiators, except that the games were played on an ice rink installed at the Manchester Arena. The show was sponsored by 7 Up.

Although the series won a Bronze Rose for Light Entertainment at the 1998 Rose d'Or Festival, it was not successful with critics and viewers, receiving negative reviews and poor ratings. The show came to an end after one series.

== Format ==
The narrative of the show is explained in the opening title sequence:

After the millennium, a new ice age ravaged the Earth. Entire cities were destroyed, yet deep beneath the frozen ice plains, mankind survived. An elite taskforce travelled back through time to prepare it by means of The Tournament. Their task: to ensure the survival of mankind. They were not indestructible, but instructors; not masters, but mentors. They were the Ice Warriors.

Each episode featured two teams of eight athletes and ice skaters made up four men and four women along with a coach. Each team represented different cities of the UK, competing in what was known as 'The Tournament'. Overseen by the ice master, Shem Jadier (Philip Ferrentinos), the tournament consisted of a series of challenges set on the ice, with teams competing against one other and the Ice Warriors. Points - or 'credits' as they were known - were awarded to teams based on their performance.

The team that earned the most credits won and advanced to the final challenge, 'Polar Pursuit', which was a chase race between four players on the winning team and four of the Ice Warriors. Each Ice Warrior had a flag on their back, and players had to grab these flags before the end of the race. Each flag captured earned money for the winning team, with the value increasing as the tournament progressed.

After the six heats, the four teams that earned the most money in 'Polar Pursuit' returned to contest two semi-finals, the winners of which then faced off against each other in the Grand Final to decide the series champions.

Early episodes also had an entertainment interval of a figure skating performance, but this was dropped mid-way during the series when its running time was reduced.

== Ice Warriors ==
The show attempted to create a backstory and lore for the characters drawn from elements of fantasy fiction. Some of those who appeared as the Ice Warriors were professional winter athletes.

Alias	Real name	Occupation	Description
Azra the Ice Angel	Nichola Grant (Etgart)		
Draygarr the Merciless	Bobby Brown	Stunt performer	"Always at the heart of the battle."
Kaalak the Drifter	Stefan Sanchez		"He came from nowhere with his past shrouded in mystery."
Kisha the Starburst	Sandra Voetelink	Professional speed skater	"With the power of a supernova."
Krell the Tormentor	Hilton Ruggles	Ice hockey player	"The warrior that all challengers wish to defeat, an ambition that very few achieve."
Krystor the Enchantress	Katie Rothwell		"Her ability to bewitch and confound made her name legendary."
Marax the Vixen	Fiona King	Teacher	"She was raised by beasts of the snow."
Morka the Fireblade	Jay Savage		"He came gladly to compete with the best and prove himself their better, as many have found to their cost."
Rax the Destroyer	Marc Twaite	Ice hockey player	"Many come with dreams of victory, but many found that Rax has destroyed those dreams."
Sharak the Avenger	Tony Blaze		"Cross him at your peril, for he is not lightly called the Avenger."
Taaraz the Renegade	Sarah-Jane Tait		"Strong, powerful and with a hunger for victory."
Thorgon the Beast	Freddie Sixtensson		"A creature of the wilderness. A wild man, he battles his way through frozen wastes."
Tyron the Deceiver	Tammy Sear	Figure skater	"Many underestimated her strength and skill, a mistake made by challengers before they faced her."
Zalan the Serene	Colette Zee		"None could disturb her serenity, for very few challengers were remotely her equal in the tournament."

== Series overview ==
Heats (winners in bold)

- **Nottingham Venom** vs Sheffield Forgers
- Isle of Wight Sharks vs **Birmingham Blizzard**
- Manchester Marauders vs **Cardiff Dragons**
- **Whitley Bay Hurricane** vs Slough Stampede
- Guildford Growlers vs **Hull Huskies**
- **Swindon Savages** vs Edinburgh Wolves

Semi-Finals

- Birmingham Blizzard vs **Hull Huskies**
- Whitley Bay Hurricane vs **Nottingham Venom**

Grand Final

- **Nottingham Venom** vs Hull Huskies
