= Dani Behr =

English singer, actress, and television presenter

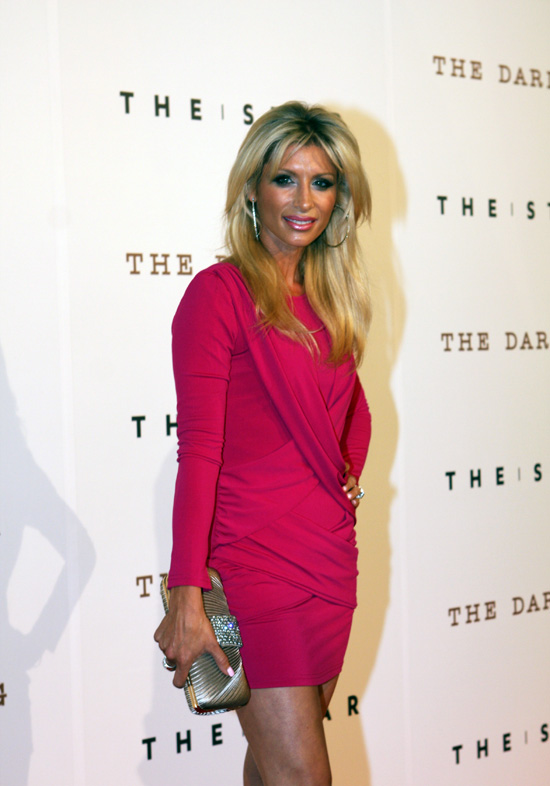
- Behr in 2011
- Born: July 9, 1970 (age 56); Mill Hill, London, England
- Education: Sylvia Young Theatre School
- Occupations: Singer; actress; television presenter
- Years active: 1989–2008
- Television: The Word; The Big Breakfast; Ice Warriors; The Saturday Show; Boy Meets Boy
- Musical career
- Genre: Pop
- Instrument: Vocals
- Years active: 1990
- Label: WEA
- Website: danibehr.com

Dani Behr (born July 9, 1970) is an English former singer, actress, voice-over artist and television presenter.

== Early life ==
Behr was born in Mill Hill, London, of South African Jewish descent. Her father is a partner in London estate agents Behr & Butchoff. Behr is a graduate of the Sylvia Young Theatre School, and was discovered by Pet Shop Boys manager Tom Watkins, who put her in his female Bros concept, Faith Hope & Charity singing alongside Diana Barrand and future Xpansions member Sally Ann Marsh, signed to WEA. However, the trio were not successful and Behr moved into television production.

== Personal life ==
Behr formerly lived in London and had several high profile relationships, most notably with Premier League footballers, which led to her being described as a WAG. She met and married restaurateur Carl Hewin, with whom she has two children and they relocated to a Los Angeles suburb. The couple separated after nine years of marriage, citing personal differences.

== Career ==
In 1989, Behr had a brief appearance in Grange Hill and then later was a presenter on the late night Channel 4 music show, The Word, for five years. She went on to feature in over 30 TV shows, including The Big Breakfast, Hotel Babylon, Ice Warriors; and in 2001 the co-presenting role alongside Joe Mace on the first series of the BBC's flagship children's programme The Saturday Show. She provided the voice for the on board ship's computer (also named Dani) in the computer game Privateer 2.

Behr starred in Goodbye Charlie Bright, a film by Nick Love. She played the character of Blondie, the love interest of Charlie.

From October 2001 until June 2007, she voiced the safety message on Virgin Atlantic. Behr also was Maxim's female presenter of the year in 2002.

After presenting shows in the United States, Behr moved permanently to Hollywood to present Extra for NBC. She went on to host several more shows for Fox, NBC/Bravo, VH1, including the 2003 reality show Boy Meets Boy. In between TV, Behr has also presented radio shows for Kiss 100, and has had some minor film acting roles and appeared alongside Kate Winslet, Oprah Winfrey, Glenn Close in the play The Vagina Monologues both in London at The Old Vic and on Broadway at Madison Square Garden.

After marriage and the birth of her two children, Behr appeared on the 2008 edition of ITV's I'm a Celebrity... Get Me out of Here! where she was the second person to be voted out by the public, on day 12.

On 20 September 2009, Behr appeared in a celebrity episode of Come Dine with Me alongside Laila Morse, Dane Bowers, and Bobby Davro. Behr came last.

Behr resides in Los Angeles where she works as an estate agent.

== Filmography ==
- 1989 – The Rainbow; schoolgirl
- 1996 – Privateer 2: The Darkening; ship's computer (voice)
- 1997 – Bolt; herself
- 1998 – Ice Warriors; presenter
- 1998 – Like It Is; Paula
- 1999 – Dark Realm; Candy (episode "Party On")
- 2001 – Rancid Aluminium; Charlie
- 2001 – Goodbye Charlie Bright; Blondie
- 2002 – Tabloid; herself
- 2004 – The Littlest Groom; presenter
- 2008 – I'm a Celebrity... Get Me out of Here!; contestant
