= Spexy Beast =

Spexy Beast Tour
- Stand Up tour by Alan Carr
- Promotional poster for tour
- Location: United Kingdom & Ireland
- Start date: 11 September 2011
- End date: 6 November 2011
- Legs: 1
- No. of shows: 33 in United Kingdom & Ireland

Spexy Beast is a stand-up comedy tour performed by British comedian Alan Carr. The tour was Carr's first to be performed in arena type venues, with extra dates being added in most territories due to popular demand.

== Show incidents ==
During one of the shows in Brighton a female member of the audience, who was pregnant went into labour from laughing so much. Tessa Lawson was watching the comic’s new Spexy Beast show when she felt the baby move and rushed to the toilet just before the interval. When her waters broke, she was rushed to hospital and gave birth to a healthy girl later that evening. Carr later commented on the incident via Twitter stating,

"An audience member has gone into labour. Pass me a hot towel and tongs, I’m going in! Love to you and bump."

== Tour dates ==
Date	City	Country	Venue
United Kingdom & Ireland
11 September 2011	Brighton	England	Brighton Centre
12 September 2011	Brighton	England	Brighton Centre
13 September 2011	Brighton	England	Brighton Centre
14 September 2011	Brighton	England	Brighton Centre
16 September 2011	Manchester	England	Manchester Arena
17 September 2011	Manchester	England	Manchester Arena
21 September 2011	London	England	Wembley Arena
22 September 2011	London	England	Wembley Arena
23 September 2011	Bournemouth	England	Bournemouth International Centre
24 September 2011	Bournemouth	England	Bournemouth International Centre
25 September 2011	Bournemouth	England	Bournemouth International Centre
26 September 2011	Bournemouth	England	Bournemouth International Centre
1 October 2011	Birmingham	England	National Indoor Arena
2 October 2011	Birmingham	England	National Indoor Arena
4 October 2011	Nottingham	England	Capital FM Arena
5 October 2011	Nottingham	England	Capital FM Arena
7 October 2011	Glasgow	Scotland	Scottish Exhibition and Conference Centre
8 October 2011	Glasgow	Scotland	Scottish Exhibition and Conference Centre
10 October 2011	Aberdeen	Scotland	Aberdeen Exhibition and Conference Centre
12 October 2011	Dublin	Ireland	The O_{2}
14 October 2011	Sheffield	England	Motorpoint Arena Sheffield
15 October 2011	Sheffield	England	Motorpoint Arena Sheffield
17 October 2011	Belfast	Northern Ireland	Odyssey Arena
18 October 2011	Belfast	Northern Ireland	Odyssey Arena
20 October 2011	Cardiff	Wales	Motorpoint Arena Cardiff
21 October 2011	Cardiff	Wales	Motorpoint Arena Cardiff
22 October 2011	Cardiff	Wales	Motorpoint Arena Cardiff
25 October 2011	Liverpool	England	Liverpool Echo Arena
26 October 2011	Liverpool	England	Liverpool Echo Arena
29 October 2011	Newcastle	England	Metro Radio Arena
30 October 2011	Newcastle	England	Metro Radio Arena
5 November 2011	London	England	The O_{2} Arena
6 November 2011	London	England	The O_{2} Arena
