= Patsy Palmer =

English-American actress and DJ (born 1972)

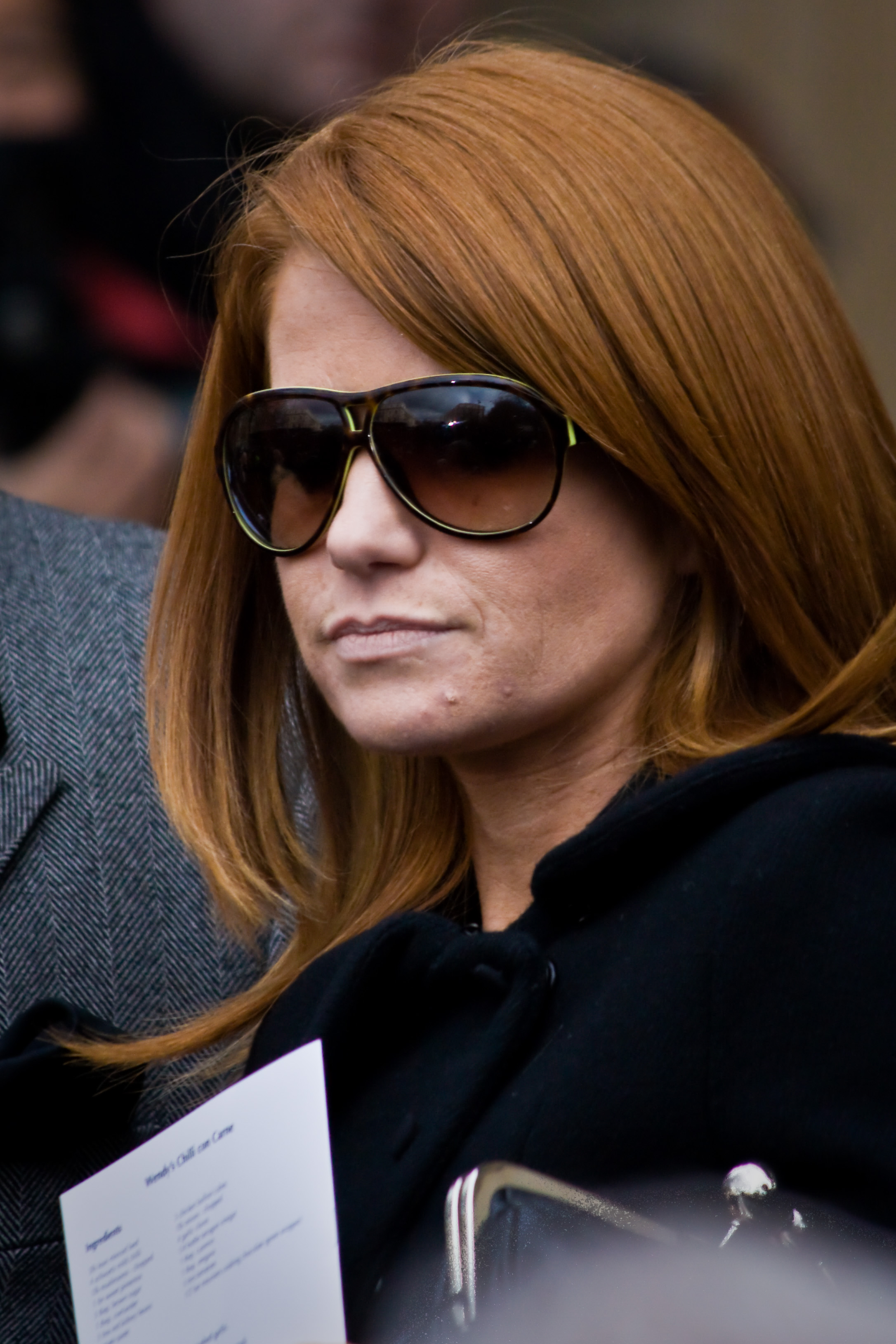
- Palmer in 2009
- Born: Julie Anne Harris; 26 May 1972 (age 54); Bethnal Green, London, England
- Occupations: Actress; DJ; Businesswoman
- Years active: 1984–present
- Television: Grange Hill; EastEnders; Strictly Come Dancing; The Masked Singer; Dancing on Ice; Celebrity Big Brother
- Spouses: Nick Love (m. 1998; div. 2000) Richard Merkell (m. 2000)
- Children: 4, including Charley
- Relatives: Lindsey Coulson (sister-in-law)

Julie Anne Merkell (née Harris; born 26 May 1972), known professionally as Patsy Palmer, is a British-American actress and DJ. After appearing as Natasha in the children's drama series Grange Hill (1985–1987), she came to prominence for her portrayal of Bianca Jackson in the BBC soap opera EastEnders (1993–1999, 2008–2014, 2019, 2024–2025). For her portrayal of the latter, she won the British Soap Award for Best Actress in 2000, and later the award for Best Comedy Performance in 2025.

Her other acting roles include The Bill, Gimme Gimme Gimme and The Catherine Tate Show. Palmer began DJing in 2012, and subsequently relocated to Malibu, California, in 2014. She has also appeared as a contestant on Strictly Come Dancing (2005), Comic Relief Does The Apprentice (2009), The Masked Singer (2020), Dancing on Ice (2023) and Celebrity Big Brother (2025).

== Early life ==
Palmer was born Julie Anne Harris, on 26 May 1972, to Albert and Patricia Harris (née Palmer) and was raised in Bethnal Green, London, where she attended Globe Primary School and then nearby at Haggerston Girls Secondary School. She was brought up by her mother, along with her two elder brothers, Albert and Harry. She also has half siblings named Georgia and Berty. Palmer's father was Irish. Palmer's mother spotted her talent for acting and encouraged her to attend Anna Scher's acting school in London. Palmer was bullied at school, and has said that acting was a form of escape. At age six, she appeared in a West End production of Joseph and the Amazing Technicolor Dreamcoat.

== Career ==
=== Early career ===
Upon enrolling at the Anna Scher Theatre school, and learning about an accomplished actress already with the name Julie Harris, Palmer adopted her current name by using her mother's maiden name and changing her given name to her mother's pet name, Patsy. Palmer made her screen debut in the television programme The Gentle Touch in 1984. Like many other EastEnders actors, Palmer appeared on the children's drama show Grange Hill between 1985 and 1987. She went on to have small roles in BBC's Tricky Business (1989), Making News (1990), Clarissa (1991), Love Hurts (1992), Drop the Dead Donkey (1993), and The Bill, where she portrayed four different roles from 1988 to 1993. She also appeared as an acne-ridden teenager in a 1989 Clearasil advert, and in a 1992 BT advert with other future EastEnders actor Jake Wood.

=== EastEnders ===
In 1993, she was cast in the role of Bianca Jackson in the BBC soap opera EastEnders. Bianca's on-screen marriage to Ricky Butcher (Sid Owen) in 1997 drew one of the biggest soap audiences ever – more than 22 million. She remained in the role for six years, but left the show in 1999 to spend more time with her family and to concentrate on other projects. She reprised the role in May 2002 in a special, EastEnders: Ricky and Bianca. The two-part, hour-long special was filmed in Manchester, which reunited Bianca and Ricky for the first time in over two years.

In 2005, Palmer publicly criticised EastEnders, branding the storylines ridiculous and unbelievable and stating that she "wouldn't go back to EastEnders". However, in October 2007 the BBC announced that Palmer would be returning to the soap as a full-time character; she made her comeback on-screen in April 2008. Of her return, Palmer said: "I can't wait to explore what Bianca has been doing with her life and seeing what she is going to get up to next", and EastEnders executive producer Diederick Santer added: "I'm delighted to welcome Patsy Palmer home to EastEnders. Bianca is one of the most popular characters the show has ever had". In 2014, Palmer announced that she was leaving the soap opera. She reprised the role again in the autumn of 2019 for a short stint. In February 2020, it was announced that Palmer would be reprising her role as Bianca again, with scenes set to air later in the year. However, this was later cancelled owing to the COVID-19 pandemic restrictions. In January 2024, it was announced that Palmer would be reprising the role again for a short stint. The character returned in March 2024 and appeared until June of that year, prior to a further return in September. She departed the role in 2025, in a storyline accommodating the exit of Bianca's on-screen sister, Sonia Fowler (Natalie Cassidy).

=== Other work ===
Palmer made a guest appearance on the Christmas Day 1993 episode of Top of the Pops introducing 'No Limit' by 2 Unlimited with presenter Mark Franklin.

Palmer worked on the first series of OK TV with Fiona Phillips in 1999. In the first episode of the series she was shown at a beauty salon where she had her hair shampooed whilst she interviewed Lindsey Coulson, who played her fictional mother Carol Jackson in EastEnders. In 1999, Palmer made a cameo appearance as herself in an episode of Kathy Burke's sitcom, Gimme Gimme Gimme; it made light of her role as Bianca Jackson. She appeared as Clare in the detective series McCready and Daughter, which aired for a pilot and one series between 2000 and 2001. She made an appearance in He Knew He Was Right for the BBC in 2004, and in 2001 she was seen in the television mini-series Do or Die, which aired on Sky One.

On stage she has starred in the one-woman musical Tell Me On A Sunday, which toured the UK, and played in London's West End. She also had a leading role in a UK tour of the musical Steppin' Out, appeared in the original West End run of Mum's the Word, and acted in We Happy Few by Imogen Stubbs, which played a short run at the Gielgud Theatre.

Palmer stood in for GMTV's Lorraine Kelly, presenting her Lorraine Live section for a week in 1999, reporting from Miami on fashion, lifestyle, health and fitness. She has also co-hosted Channel 4's Big Breakfast as a guest presenter for a week. Palmer has released a number of hit fitness videos and DVDs: Patsy Palmer – The Club Workout (2000), Patsy Palmer – The Urban Workout (2002) and Patsy Palmer's Ibiza Workout (2002). In 2006 Palmer made an appearance in the charity fitness DVD The Allstar Workout. Palmer's film work includes the shorts Love Story (1999) directed by Nick Love, and Another Green World (2005) directed by Peter Chipping.

In 2005, Palmer became a contestant on the third series of Strictly Come Dancing. She was paired with Anton Du Beke and the pair were the eighth couple to be eliminated from the competition, finishing in 5th place overall. She has also made a cameo appearance with Catherine Tate's sketch show The Catherine Tate Show. In February 2007, she was a jury member on the BBC programme The Verdict, where various celebrities ruled on a contemporary and controversial case, based on evidence and examples from real life.

Palmer's autobiography All of Me was released in the UK on 5 April 2007. In the book, she described her ascent to fame, her struggle with addiction and how she battled to overcome her problems. In 2003, in addition to acting, Palmer and her friend, Charlotte Cutler went into business with marketer Ken Wells and a Kent-based chemical company, to create "Palmer Cutler", selling beauty and self-tanning products.

In 2008, a short film starring Palmer was released by housing and homelessness charity Shelter. Palmer has been DJing since 2012, including in United States since 2017. In January 2020, Palmer appeared as the Butterfly on the ITV reality singing competition The Masked Singer. In March, Palmer participated in the third series of The Great Stand Up to Cancer Bake Off. In December, she appeared as a guest on The One Show in an episode dedicated to the late Barbara Windsor. In 2023, Palmer was a contestant on the fifteenth series of Dancing on Ice. She was paired with Matt Evers and the pair were fourth to be eliminated. In April 2025, Palmer entered the Celebrity Big Brother house to appear as a housemate on the twenty-fourth series.

== Personal life ==
Palmer has been married twice and has four children, including Charley Palmer Rothwell, who is also an actor. For 10 years, starting in 2004, she lived with her husband and children in Western Terrace and then Kemptown, Brighton, England. Her brother, Harry Harris, is married to Lindsey Coulson, the actress who played her on-screen mother Carol Jackson in EastEnders. In April 2014, Palmer and most of her family moved to Malibu, California.

Palmer has stated that she struggled with alcoholism and drug addiction, and that during her early stints on EastEnders she frequently turned up on set either high or hungover. She has said that she began experimenting with alcohol and drugs from the age of 10 that and her addiction lasted for 24 years. In 2010, she stated that she had been clean of drugs and alcohol since September 2004 and that "We don't have drink in our house".

Palmer, who was bullied during her school years, lent her support to the Department for Education's anti-bullying campaign in 2000. She is an active patron of Children's Cancer Charity CLIC Sargent.

== Filmography ==
Year	Title	Role	Notes	Ref.
1984	The Gentle Touch	1st Girl	Episode: "Secrets"	
1985–1987	Grange Hill	Natasha	Series regular	
1988	The Bill	Youth in car	Episode: "Stealing Cars and Nursery Rhymes"	
1988	The Bill	Teenage girl	Episode: "Tigers"	
1989	The Country Boy	Lisa	2 episodes	
1989	Tricky Business	Zoe	Series regular	
1989	Skullduggery	Mandy	Television film	
1989	First and Last	Young Girl	Television film	
1990	Making News	Rachel	Episode: "Line of Fire"	
1990	The Bill	Suzanne	Episode: "Blue Murder"	
1991	Clarissa	Kitty	1 episode	
1992	Love Hurts	Girl in red top	Episode: "Walk Right Back"	
1993	Full Stretch	Heather Love	Episode: "Risky Business"	
1993	Drop the Dead Donkey	Bev	Episode: "George and His Daughter"	
1993	The Bill	Siobhan Anderson	Episode: "Unreliable Witness"	
1993–1999, 2008–2014, 2019, 2024–2025	EastEnders	Bianca Jackson	Series regular	
1999	Love Story	Sharon	Short film	
2000	Gimme Gimme Gimme	Herself	Episode: "Teacher's Pet"	
2000	McCready and Daughter	Clare McCready	Television film	
2001	McCready and Daughter	Clare McCready	5 episodes	
2001	Do or Die	Claire	2 episodes	
2001	The Urban Workout	Herself	Video release; also executive producer	
2002	EastEnders: Ricky & Bianca	Bianca Jackson	Spin-off	
2004	He Knew He Was Right	Mrs Bozzle	3 episodes	
2005	Another Green World	Woman	Short film	
2005	Strictly Come Dancing	Herself	Contestant; series 3	
2006	The Catherine Tate Show	Woman dressed as a battery	Episode: "Gingers for Justice"	
2008	Trapped	Lynne Jackson	Short film	
2008	Children in Need	Eliza Dolittle	Children in Need 2008	
2009	Comic Relief Does The Apprentice	Herself	Contestant	
2010	EastEnders: Last Tango in Walford	Bianca Jackson	Spin-off	
2010–2011	EastEnders: E20	Bianca Butcher	spin-off	
2013	T&B 4Eva	Bianca Butcher	Spin-off	
2015	Jacked	Russell's Mother	Short film	
2020	The Masked Singer	Butterfly	Contestant; series 1	
2023	Dancing on Ice	Herself	Contestant; series 15	
2025	Celebrity Big Brother	Herself	Housemate; series 24	

== Awards and nominations ==
Year	Ceremony	Category	Nominated work	Result	Ref.
1998	RTS Programme Awards	Best Actor – Female	EastEnders	Nominated	
1999	British Soap Awards	Best Actress	EastEnders	Nominated	
2000	British Soap Awards	Best Actress	EastEnders	Won	
2000	British Soap Awards	Best On-Screen Partnership (with Sid Owen)	EastEnders	Nominated	
2000	TV Quick and TV Choice Awards	Best Actress	EastEnders	Won	
2000	Inside Soap Awards	Best Actress	EastEnders	Won	
2008	Inside Soap Awards	Best Storyline	EastEnders	Nominated	
2009	TRIC Awards	TV Soap Personality	EastEnders	Nominated	
2009	British Soap Awards	Best Dramatic Performance	EastEnders	Nominated	
2010	British Soap Awards	Best On-Screen Partnership (with Sid Owen)	EastEnders	Nominated	
2025	British Soap Awards	Best Comedy Performance	EastEnders	Won	
2025	Inside Soap Awards	Best Comic Performance	EastEnders	Nominated	
