= Faith Hope & Charity (British group) =

- Genres: Pop
- Years active: 1990
- Labels: WEA
- Past members: Dani Behr; Sally Ann Marsh; Diana Barrand

Faith Hope & Charity were a short-lived British girl group that featured Dani Behr, Sally Ann Marsh and Diana Barrand. They released two singles and an album. They had a minor hit with their debut single "Battle of the Sexes" which peaked at No. 53 on the UK Singles Chart in 1990. Failing to become successful, the group broke up. Behr went into television production, while Marsh pursued an acting career, as well as becoming a vocalist for a number of groups.

== Discography ==
- "Battle of the Sexes" / "Battle of the Sexes" (Battlebeats) (1990), WEA (UK 7-inch single) UK Chart #53
- "Growing Pains" (Pettibone Remix) / "Growing Pains" (Dub Mix / Edit), WEA Musik GmbH (German 7-inch single) UK Chart #99
- "Growing Pains" (Pettibone Remix) / "Growing Pains" (Extended Dub Mix) / "The Battle's One" (CD single)
