= Paul Zenon =

English entertainer

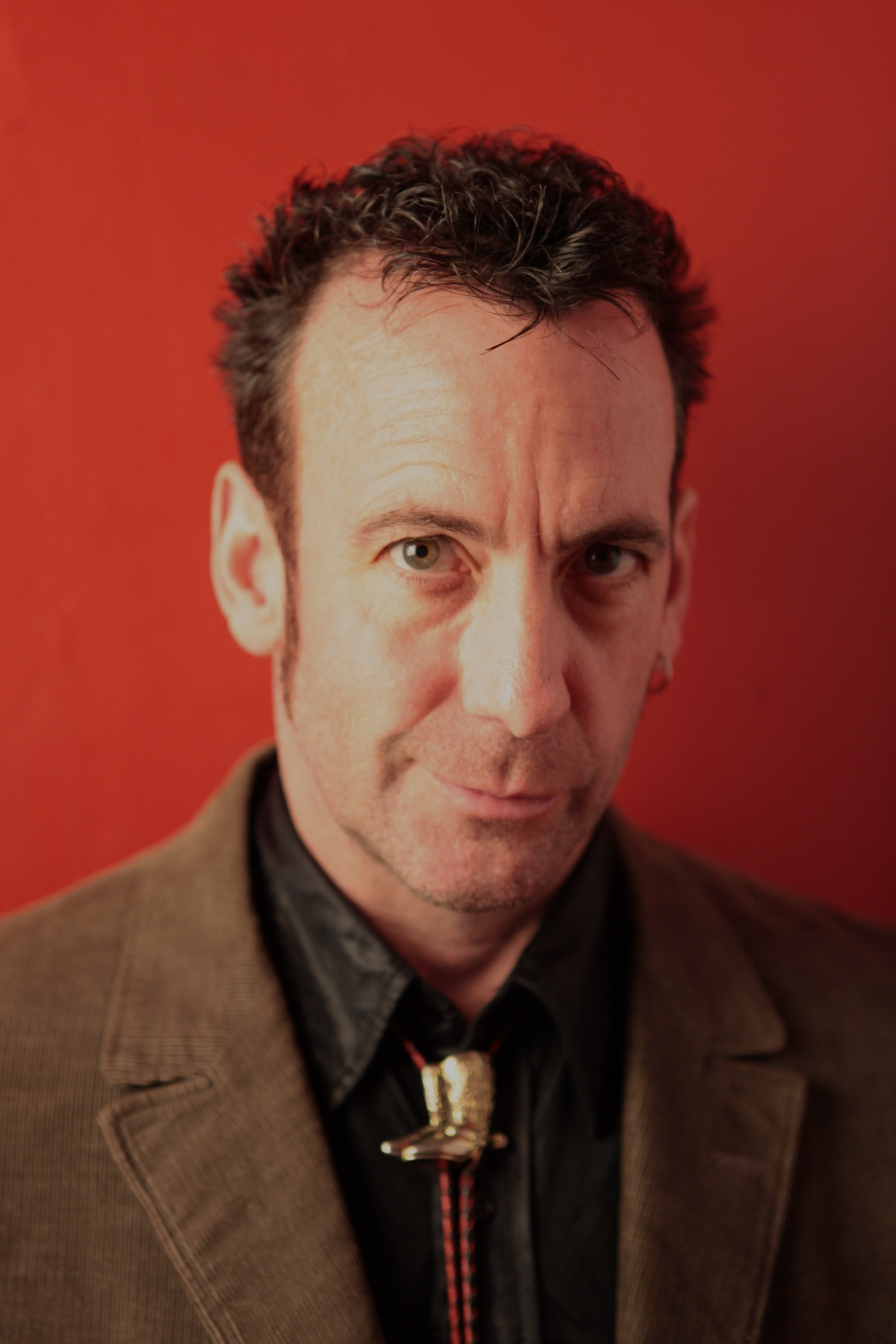
- Zenon in 2012
- Born: Paul Collins; 29 June 1964 (age 62); Skipton, Yorkshire, England
- Occupations: magician, sceptic, comedian, writer
- Years active: 1980–present
- Paul Zenon's voice Recorded October 2016
- Website: Official website

Paul Zenon (born Paul Collins) is an English stage and TV magician, comedian, presenter and writer.

He is the author of three books on magic, proposition bets and practical jokes, and an expert on the history of magic and magicians, variety, and unusual entertainments. His specialist subjects include magician and escape artiste Harry Houdini, faux Chinese magician Chung Ling Soo, and Jasper Maskelyne, the 'War Magician'. He is a sceptic with strong views on claims of psychic abilities and the paranormal.

Zenon is a Member of the Inner Magic Circle with Gold Star status and was the recipient of the Carlton Award for Comedy in 2015, the Sir Ken Dodd Comedy Award in 2017, presented by the man himself, the Neville King Award for Lifetime Achievement in 2019 and the David Berglas Award for Outstanding Contribution to Magic, also in 2019.

== Career ==
Throughout his teenage years, Zenon spent the summer holidays working in the Blackpool magic and joke shop 'The House of Secrets' which was run by Bill Thompson, who became his friend and mentor. His solo theatre piece 'Linking Rings' covers this story, together with the parallel one of Houdini and his righthand man Jim Collins, his family namesake. 'Linking Rings' has been performed at Edinburgh and Brighton Fringe Festivals with additional short seasons at Jermyn Street Theatre in London's West End, The Secret Cellar (by Waterloo Vaults), and a performance at the 2017 Blackpool Magicians' Convention.

After early performances at seaside hotels, with several dates supporting rock band Hawkwind on tour and being the lead singer in Blackpool band Crackousrockanroll, at the age of 19 Zenon travelled around Europe as a street performer, performing magic and fire-eating and supplementing his income with fortune-telling. On his return to the UK, he began performing in summer seasons and comedy clubs. He went on to host tours for the British, UN and US Forces in locations including Germany, Gibraltar, Benbecula, Croatia, Bosnia, Serbia, Belize, Argentina, the Falkland and Ascension Islands and on board the aircraft carrier HMS Invincible.

Zenon has performed and presented at corporate events worldwide since the early eighties and more recently has been a regular performer at international Arts and Fringe Festivals including Edinburgh, Brighton, London, Dublin, Cork, Adelaide, Melbourne, Brisbane and Auckland, both as guest performer and with his own solo shows, 'Turning Tricks', 'Off the Street, On the Road', 'Cabinet of Curiosities' 'Linking Rings' and 'Paul Zenon's Hellfire Club', 'Lounge Wizard' and 'Linking Rings'. Since its inception in 2003, he has been a long-term regular cast member and Ringmaster in the Olivier award-winning New Variety show 'La Clique' and its spin-off production 'La Soiree'.

Since 1980, Zenon has appeared on television as performer, presenter and pundit, including a Royal Command Performance, four one-man 'specials' on Channel 4 and ITV, and as a regular Dictionary Corner guest on Channel 4's 'Countdown, with around 120 appearances to date.

He is a Member of the Inner Magic Circle with Gold Star status. He is the author of three books. In 2012, Zenon collaborated with cult comic book artist Vince Ray to produce a custom deck of playing cards: the Z-Ray Deck, printed by the United States Playing Card Company, as part of their 'Bicycle' brand.

Zenon has given live talks, including TedX Salford, Centre for Inquiry, Goldsmiths, University of London, Ratio Conference Bulgaria, and in 2014 he hosted the QED Conference in Manchester.

In parallel with his career in magic and comedy, Zenon has also worked as an actor; in addition to his early roles in Tricky Business on Children's BBC, he has made cameo appearances in short films, and has written, produced and performed his first one-man stage drama, 'Linking Rings', at Brighton and Edinburgh Festivals which received 5 star reviews from The Edinburgh Evening News, The List and FringeReview. In 2016, Zenon made his one-man West End debut in 'Linking Rings' at the Jermyn Street Theatre in London.

In 2015, he was presented with the Carlton Award for Comedy at a ceremony at The Magic Circle's London headquarters. In 2017, while MCing the gala show of the Blackpool Magicians' Convention at the Opera House, Paul was presented with the Sir Ken Dodd Comedy Award, by Ken Dodd himself.

== Television ==
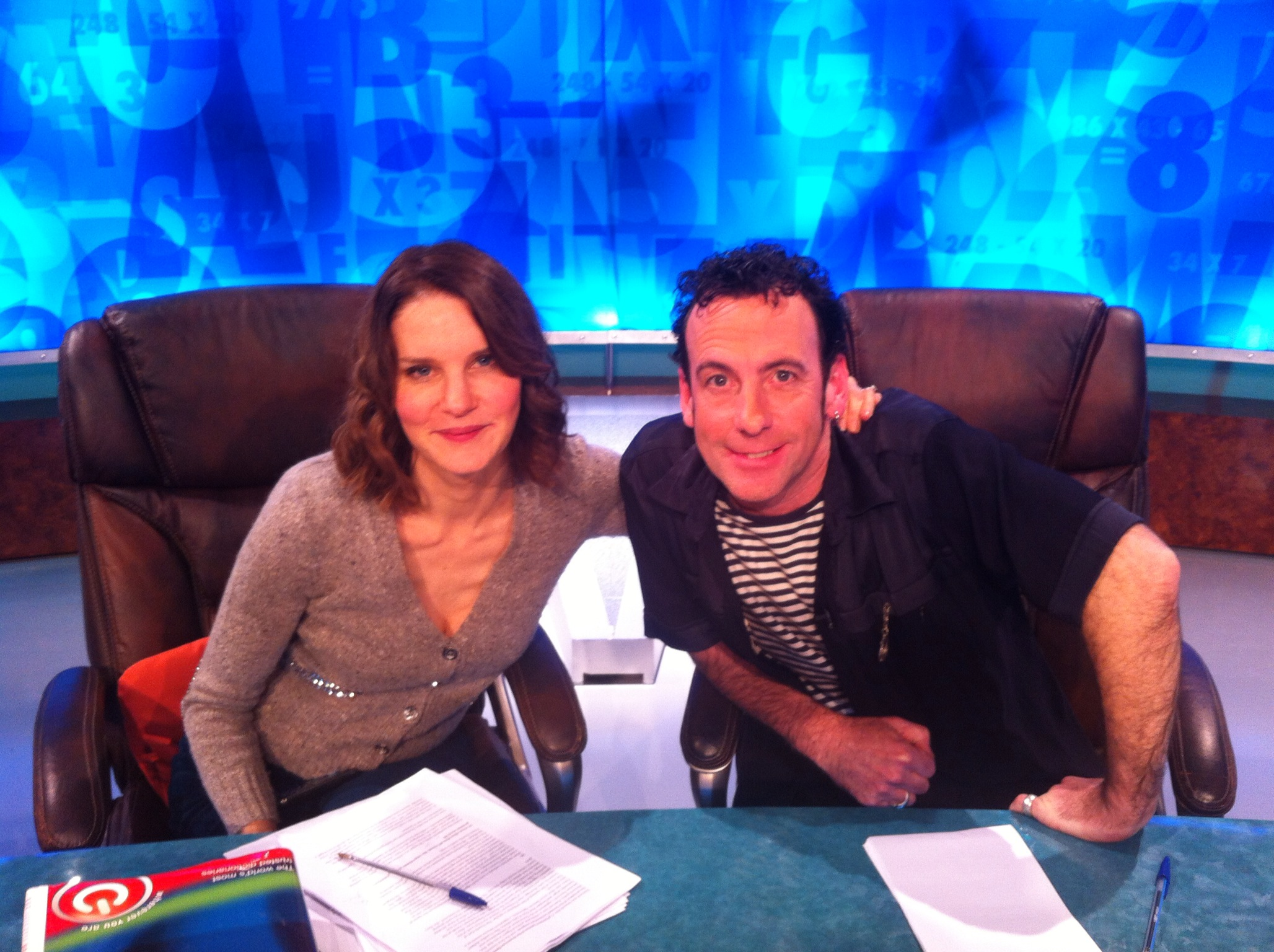
Paul Zenon with Susie Dent on C4's Countdown

Zenon's early TV appearances included Fun Factory (Granada) in 1980, and New Faces of '86 (ITV).

In 1990/1991, Zenon starred in two series of the BBC Children's drama Tricky Business, playing the role of Micky. In 1992/1993, he was the presenter of Tricks n Tracks on BBC One, a programme on which he also acted as Magic Consultant. In 1993, Paul wrote, produced and presented Magic You Can Do for retail release.

He created, wrote and produced Crazy Cottage, an ITV game show which ran for three series between 1996 and 1998. Zenon was given his own Channel 4 'Comedy Lab' episode Paul Zenon – Turning Tricks, in 1998 resulting in the commissioning of his first one-man hour-long Street Magic special of the same name in 1999. This was followed by consecutive specials Paul Zenon's Tricky Christmas (C4, 1999), Paul Zenon's Trick or Treat (C4, set in Prague, 2000) and White Magic with Paul Zenon (ITV1, set in Lapland, 2003), where he acted as writer, presenter and executive producer.

In 2005 he wrote, presented and executive-produced a prank special involving hidden cameras Paul Zenon's Revenge Squad, broadcast on ITV. Since 2004, He has been a regular guest contributor in Dictionary Corner on Channel 4's Countdown and has also appeared on The One Show (BBC1), The Culture Show (BBC2), The Story of Light Entertainment (BBC2), Magic (BBC2) Surviving D-Day (Discovery), Crafty Tricks of War (BBC2), The Gadget Show (C5), The Big Stage (C5), It Shouldn't Happen to a TV Performer (ITV1), and 50 Greatest Magic Tricks, Duck Quacks Don't Echo (Sky1), When Magic Goes Horribly Wrong (C5), BBC News and Mysteries at the Museum (Travel Channel).

== Charity ==
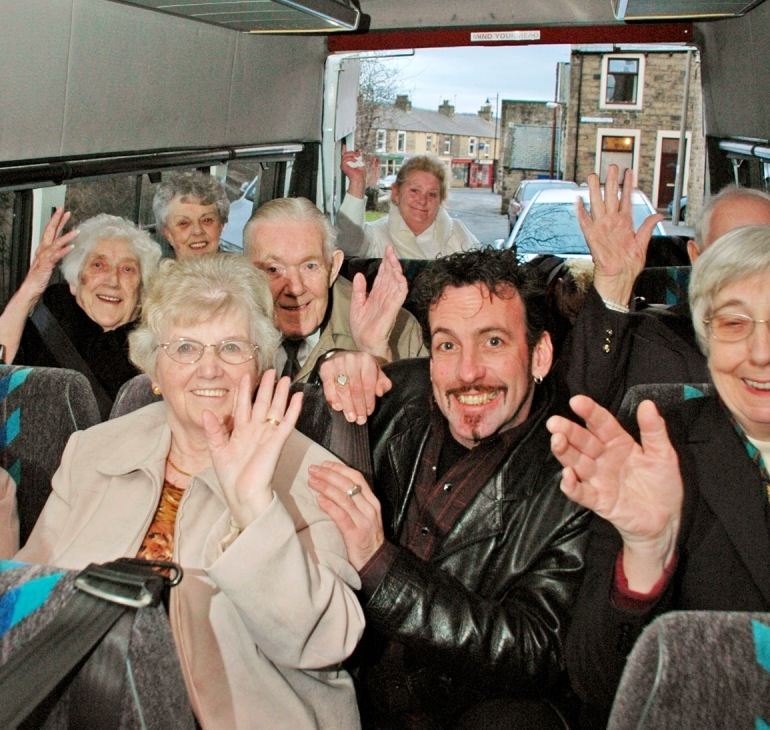
Wonderbus Outing

He is the founder of The Wonderbus, a Registered Charity which takes older people from homes and sheltered housing on days out to see live entertainment and events.

After an early fundraising show at The London Comedy Store featuring comedian Stewart Lee, in the summer of 2008 he toured British theatres with comedians Harry Hill and Lee Mack to raise funds for the organisation. In 2009 he put together and hosted a benefit show at the London Palladium featuring comedians Dara Ó Briain, Sean Lock, Lee Mack and Dave Spikey.

== Scepticism ==
During his early career, Zenon worked as a fortune-teller and since then has been a long-term sceptic with regard to the paranormal and the supernatural.

In 2011, he wrote an article in the Daily Mail suggesting that psychic Sally Morgan might be using an earpiece through which she could be fed information about members of her audience. This was after members of the public had called a radio station claiming to have heard her appearing to repeat back information that they said moments earlier they had overheard coming from the theatre lighting box during one of Morgan's shows at The Grand Canal Theatre in Dublin.

Shortly after the article was published, Zenon saw video footage of Morgan walking off a theatre stage and appearing to remove an earpiece. He announced this finding on live television on This Morning (ITV1). Shortly afterwards Morgan made a statement on her Facebook page saying: "I have done and will continue to wear an earpiece... This is entirely normal and allows me to take stage directions and cues from my Stage Director. Just to be clear, I have never received anything other than stage direction or cues from my Stage Director through an earpiece."

Citing "substantial damage to her reputation, as well as hurt, distress and embarrassment" Morgan filed a complaint to Associated Newspapers and sued for damages over their allegations made via a number of articles about the subject. The Daily Mail eventually agreed to pay a smaller figure as settlement and retracted the allegation that an earpiece was specifically used to receive information about members of the audience.

Zenon continues to be an outspoken critic of those who purport to be psychic, particularly with regard to claims of receiving communications from beyond the grave. He has contributed to many debates on the subject both at live events including those hosted by Edinburgh Skeptics, Skeptics in the Pub (various), Center for Inquiry (London), Goldsmiths, University of London and Ratio Conference, Bulgaria as well as numerous radio and television programmes. In April 2014 he hosted the QED Conference in Manchester, also co-writing and appearing in the opening film.

== Books ==
Paul is the author of three books:

- 100 Ways to Win a Tenner: Scams, Cons, Games You Can't Lose! (2003).
- Paul Zenon's Dirty Tricks: Pranks, Wind-Ups and Practical Jokes – A Guide to Getting Your Own Back! (2004).
- Street Magic: Great Tricks and Close-up Secrets Revealed (2005).

Street Magic was re-published in 2008 in a smaller format, with illustrations rather than photographs. it was also sub-divided into smaller sections which were released as individual volumes under various titles.

100 Ways to Win a Tenner was released in the States under the title 100 Ways to Win a Ten-Spot and in Australia as Bar Bets.

Condensed versions of Paul Zenon's Dirty Tricks and Street Magic were re-released in 2016 as Paul Zenon's Practical Jokes and Paul Zenon's Practical Magic.
