= Tales of the Tooth Fairies =

- Genre: Children's television
- Created by: Françoise Caspan
- Directed by: Vincent Monluc
- Voices of: Eric Collinson; Julie Higginson; Penelope Keith; David Kelly; Sally Ann Marsh; Mathonwy Reeves; Nigel Planer
- Composer: Gérard Labady
- Countries of origin: United Kingdom; France; Germany; Belgium
- Original language: English
- No. of seasons: 1
- No. of episodes: 26 (13 dubbed)

Production
- Executive producer: Steve Walsh
- Producers: Jean-François Laguionie; Robin Lyons; Jürgen Egenolf; Pierre Levie
- Running time: 5 minutes
- Production companies: Siriol Productions; La Fabrique; EVA Entertainment; JEP Animation; Sofidoc S.A.

Original release
- Network: BBC One; WDR; France 3
- Release: 7 September – 14 December 1993

Tales of the Tooth Fairies (French: Souris Souris) is a children's television programme created by Françoise Caspan. It was produced in 1992 by Siriol Productions, La Fabrique, EVA Entertainment, JEP Animation (as Cologne Cartoon), and Sofidoc S.A. for WDR and France 3. In the United Kingdom, it was aired on BBC One from 7 September until 14 December 1993, along with Noddy's Toyland Adventures and BBC Two on 20 October 1994.

== Plot ==
In the series, Gisele and Martin are "tooth mice": mice who perform the duties of tooth fairies. When a child in need loses a milk tooth, the two mice (assisted by their friend Arthur the cormorant), retrieve the tooth and give the child a fitting gift. They do this on orders from their Queen Elisa.

== Characters ==
Gisele
One of the tooth mice, she is usually the one to collect a tooth and slip a present under the pillow. (Voiced by Sally Ann Marsh.)
Martin
Gisele's partner, he is usually the one to throw a grappling hook and line for Gisele to climb on. (Voiced by Mathonwy Reeves.)
Arthur
A cormorant and the two mice's helper who gives them rides and prevents anyone from interfering with their job. He is also the narrator of every episode. (Voiced by David Kelly.)
Queen Elisa
The bossy and snappy queen of the Milk Teeth Kingdom, she decides what fitting presents Gisele and Martin must exchange for milk teeth. She is a little bad tempered, but always means well. (Voiced by Penelope Keith.)
Roland Rat
A thieving nuisance who likes to steal the two mice's presents for himself, but is always thwarted.
Romuald the Reindeer
A clumsy, teenage reindeer. (Voiced by Nigel Planer.)

== Episodes ==
No.	Title	Original release date
1	"Mission: Toothbrush"	7 September 1993
The Tooth Mice are sent in bad weather to deliver toothbrushes to twins with bad teeth.
2	"The Silver Sleighbell"	14 September 1993
The Tooth Mice deliver to an eskimo sleighbells for his dog sled, aided by the clumsy reindeer Romuald.
3	"The Golden Scissors"	21 September 1993
The Tooth Mice deliver to a girl named Fabienne a small pair of scissors.
4	"Flying Feathers"	28 September 1993
The Tooth Mice procure a goose feather to substitute a feather pen for a fountain pen specially for a girl named Anna.
5	"A Proud Candle"	5 October 1993
The Tooth Mice venture in a flooding storm to give a boy named Vincent a special flashing candle, with help from a stray cat named Rammy.
6	"Magic Chimes"	12 October 1993
The Tooth Mice pick a rare bluebell flower for a girl named Sophie, almost getting caught by an owl, but rescued by Arthur.
7	"Jonathan Loses His Tooth"	19 October 1993
The Tooth Mice bring an absent-minded boy named Jonathan a special diary, and in the process get the tooth mouse teacher her job back.
8	"Stolen Present"	9 November 1993
As the Tooth Mice try to deliver a whistle for a boy named Fabian, it is taken by Ronald Rat, but Arthur helps them recover it.
9	"The Bell Doll"	16 November 1993
Gisele does not return from her tooth exchange job, so Arthur delivers a bell doll to a girl named Emily and rescues Gisele from a cage.
10	"The Book of Leaves"	23 November 1993
As the Tooth Mice deliver a leaf book to a girl named Sandree, Marad the Buzzard captures Gisele, but Gisele soothes her to sleep with the book.
11	"Mr. Sun, Mrs. Rain"	30 November 1993
The Tooth Mice bring a girl named Audrey a comb, but have trouble as Audrey's pet cat shows up.
12	"Sky Scraper"	7 December 1993
The Tooth Mice go to the 60th floor of a sky scraper to bring a boy named Charles a clockwork bird, running into Roland Rat on the way.
13	"Cat's Enough"	14 December 1993
The Tooth Mice bring a ring to a girl named Julie, taking a risk from her vicious pet cat Leo, but get some help from Julie herself.

== Availability ==
- VHS - "Tales of the Tooth Fairies: Mission Toothbrush"
- VHS - "Crayola Presents Tales of the Tooth Fairies VHS"
