= Tricky Business (British TV series) =

British children's TV sitcom

- Created by: Forrest Wilson
- Starring: Paul Zenon
- Country of origin: United Kingdom
- Original language: English
- No. of series: 2
- No. of episodes: 27

Production
- Running time: 30 minutes (regular); 60 minutes (special)

Original release
- Network: BBC1
- Release: 6 April 1989 – 30 May 1991

Tricky Business is a British children's television sitcom which ran for three series from 6 April 1989 to 30 May 1991. It featured Anthony Davis and Sally Ann Marsh and Una Stubbs in the first series, David Wood, Anthony Davis, Patsy Palmer and a puppet rabbit called Crabtree, performed by Marcus Clarke and made by Hands Up Puppets, in the second and Bernie Clifton and Leslie Schofield in the third. Paul Zenon was the longest-surviving cast member, playing Tricky Micky in series two and himself in series three, as well as being the magic consultant for both those series.

== Cast ==
- Anthony Davis
- Sally Ann Marsh
- Una Stubbs
- Patsy Palmer
- Bernie Clifton
- Paul Zenon
- Marcus Clarke
