= Planet 24 =

British television production company

- Type: Subsidiary
- Industry: Television
- Predecessor: 24 Hour Productions
- Founded: 20 August 1992; 34 years ago
- Defunct: 2004; 22 years ago
- Fate: Merged into Carlton Productions
- Successor: Castaway Television Productions (Survivor formatting rights)
- Headquarters: London, England, United Kingdom
- Key people: Bob Geldof
- Parent: Carlton Communications (1999–2004)
- Divisions: Impossible TV

Planet 24 is a television production company, which produced The Big Breakfast and The Word for Channel 4. It had an animation division called Impossible TV, founded in 1997.

== History ==
Bob Geldof and Tony Boland (television producer) founded Planet Pictures, which merged with 24 Hour Productions, headed by Charlie Parsons and Waheed, later Lord Alli. The company was bought by Carlton Communications in March 1999 for £15 million and eventually merged with Carlton Productions, of which Lord Alli became managing director.

=== Creation of Survivor ===
Planet 24 also developed the original concept for Survivor, which was initially called Castaway. Geldof and Parsons met with the BBC to pitch the program as a reality competition show. However, the BBC, which was intrigued by the concept, instead developed its own competing documentary-style show, Castaway 2000. As a result, Planet 24 had to change the title, and the show was originally produced as Expedition Robinson in Sweden in 1997 before its U.S. success in 2000. When Geldof, Parsons, and Lord Alli sold Planet 24 to Carlton, they retained the rights to this program by transferring them to a new company named Castaway Television Productions.

In July 2017, Banijay Group acquired Castaway Television Productions.

== Filmography ==
- Can You Pull…? (2004)
- The Richard Taylor Interviews (2003)
- Survivor (2001–2002)
- The Richard Blackwood Show (1999–2001)
- Take 2 (1999)
- Watercolour Challenge (1998–2001)
- Totally California (1997)
- American Visions (1997)
- Hotel Babylon (1996)
- Gaytime TV (1995-1999)
- Surf Potatoes (1994)
- The Wednesday Weepie (1993)
- The Word: Access All Areas (1992)
- The Big Breakfast (1992–2002)
- The Word (1990–1995)
