= Terry Christian =

British broadcaster

- Born: Terence Christian; 8 May 1960 (age 66); Manchester, Lancashire, England
- Education: Thames Polytechnic
- Occupations: Broadcaster; journalist; author; comedian
- Years active: 1981–present
- Terry Christian's voice First published 13 March 2014

Terence Christian is an English broadcaster, journalist, author and stand-up comedian. He has presented several national television series in the UK including Channel 4's late-night entertainment show The Word (1990–1995) and six series of ITV1 moral issues talk show It's My Life (2003–2008). He has also been a regular guest panelist on the topical Channel 5 series The Wright Stuff and Jeremy Vine.

Christian presented two series of Turn on Terry with regular guest Tony Wilson and numerous other programmes for ITV, MTV, VH1, Channel 4 as well as a variety of different local and national radio programmes on stations including BBC Radio 4, BBC Radio 6 Music, Talksport, Century Radio, Key 103, Signal and BBC Radio Derby and BBC Radio Manchester. While at Radio Derby he won two Sony Awards.

== Biography ==
=== Early life ===
Christian grew up in the Brooks Bar neighbourhood of Old Trafford with five brothers and sisters to Irish immigrant parents from Dublin: Daniel Christian and Margaret Christian (née Cullen). One of his siblings died when Christian was aged two.

He was educated at St Alphonsus' RC Primary School, Ayres Road, Old Trafford, and then passed his 11 plus to attend Catholic Grammar School for Boys St Bede's College, Manchester. His father was a labourer, rivet heater, operated a fork-lift truck at Esso in Trafford Park and 25 year shop steward in the Transport & General Workers Union. He attended Thames Polytechnic (now the University of Greenwich) in London but failed his second year exams and transferred onto the final year of a biology HND at Manchester Metropolitan University graduating with HND in July 1981.

He first appeared on national TV in 1981 with other unemployed youngsters from inner-city areas of Manchester on Devil's Advocate, a 7-week ITV television series made for ITV by the World In Action team, presented by former World in Action editor Gus Macdonald and produced by Geoff Moore. The show was made in reaction to the Scarman report which looked into the causes of that summer's riots in Moss Side in Manchester, Toxteth in Liverpool, Brixton in London, Handsworth in Birmingham and St Pauls in Bristol. Other contributing youngsters on Devil's Advocate included Johnny Marr of the Smiths. As a result of his appearances on the programme, Christian was offered his own radio show on BBC Radio Derby called Barbed Wireless.

=== Radio ===
Christian presented Barbed Wireless between 1982 and 1988 at BBC Radio Derby. The show won Sony Awards in the Best Specialist Music category in 1985 and again in 1986. He also contributed regularly to Saturday Live on BBC Radio 4. From 1986 to 1988 he presented BBC School Radio programme Wavelength, which became Wavelength Plus or WPFM (broadcast on Radio 4 frequencies), on which Jo Whiley was his researcher.

Christian managed a twelve-piece reggae band from the Derby/Nottingham area, Junior C Reaction, who received airplay on John Peel and Janice Long's shows on BBC Radio 1 for their first independent release on Centurion Records, a double A side, "Cry Jahoviah" and "Love & Emotion". They were signed to Cooltempo, a Chrysalis subsidiary, and enjoyed a modicum of success with their first release, a version of the Delroy Wilson classic "Better Must Come", which was C-listed on Radio 1 and Capital Radio at the time, as well as playing a live session on Radio 4's Saturday Live. Christian also promoted concerts around the Derby and Nottingham area, and regular house nights at Derby's Twentieth Century club, where the resident Saturday-night DJ was Graeme Park.

In late 1988, Christian joined Piccadilly Radio's Key 103 FM, presenting weekday evenings and Sunday afternoon with 100% free choice in the music. Here he played all the up-and-coming bands of that era: Stone Roses, Happy Mondays, Inspiral Carpets and James. Christian also wrote "The Word" page in the Manchester Evening News from September 1989, dedicated to the Manchester music scene.

Christian was one of the first presenters on Talk Radio UK which launched in 1995 but was dismissed before the end of the year along with "shock jock" 'Caesar the Geezer' as part of a station shakeup to tackle sagging ratings.

Christian has presented on every radio station in the Manchester area and several across the North West, including Century Radio, where he presented a syndicated evening show across the network. He also presented the breakfast and drivetime show on BBC Radio Manchester, and the same station's Manchester Music Show in 2002, featuring old and new bands from the Manchester area. He then went on to host the breakfast show on BBC Radio Manchester in April 2006. He was also the presenter of The Final Whistle on talkSPORT on Saturday evenings from 2006 until 2008, alongside ex-footballer Micky Quinn.

Christian joined Stockport-based radio station Imagine FM (104.9 FM) in March 2011.

On BBC Radio 4, Christian has presented Pick of the Week as well as With Great Pleasure and A Good Read and appeared on The News Quiz, Chain Reaction (with his KFM colleague Caroline Aherne), Great Lives (where his subject was Manchester impresario Tony Wilson) and Joe Lycett's show It's Not What You Know.

=== Television ===
In 1990, with the explosion of the Madchester scene, Christian was recruited to host the Channel 4 youth entertainment show The Word, based on the format of his music magazine radio shows. The show was a mixture of pop music and teen attitude. The Word hosted many groups playing live for the first time on British TV including Oasis when still unknown with their first single, "Supersonic". Christian remained its only continuous presenter until it finished its run in 1995.

He went on to present Carlton Television's The Big City, Sky 1's pop music show The Hitmix, and The Football Show for Tyne Tees Television. He presented Turn on Terry for ITV with regular guests Tony Wilson and Alison Hammond and six series of ITV's youth discussion show It's My Life (2003–2009), made by Manchester-based independent Moore Television and filmed at Granada Television. It's My Life was nominated for two St Martin's Trust Awards.

Christian appeared as himself in the Cribs' video for the stand-alone single "You're Gonna Lose Us", which was made to look like an episode of The Word; and also played the part of Ross Peagrum, despotic TV presenter, in series 2 and 4 of the BBC TV drama series Cutting It. He appeared as a guest on other TV shows in the UK and Ireland. During the '90s, Terry was also regularly seen as a presenter on MTV Europe. In January 2009 he entered as a contestant on the sixth series of Celebrity Big Brother alongside Verne Troyer, La Toya Jackson, Ulrika Jonsson, Coolio and Mutya Buena, finishing in second place.

Christian turned to stand-up comedy with his one-man show Naked Confessions of a Recovering Catholic, which was well received. Since 2009, he has been a regular panellist on The Wright Stuff on Channel 5 and its replacement, Jeremy Vine. His latest comedy show, Confessions of an Irish Catholic, toured in 2025 and was at The Stand Comedy Club in Edinburgh for Edinburgh Fringe from 17 to 24 August. and a different version of the Show Confessions Of An Irish Catholic, had a sell out run 17th - 25th August 2025 and a 4/5 review in Edinburgh Fringe website Quintessential

=== Writing ===
Christian has been writing articles and columns for newspapers since 1983 and is a regular columnist in the Sunday People and has contributed to other British newspapers. He has also had regular columns in the Daily Sport, Manchester Evening News and the Derby Evening Telegraph and written articles for magazines like Rolling Stone and New York Rocker.

He has also written three books: Brothers – from Childhood to Oasis; Reds in the Hood (1999), about his early life growing up in Old Trafford; and My Word, a look at the world of television in the 1990s, published in June 2007.

=== Personal life ===
Terry Christian has two grown-up sons. Christian considers himself to be ethnically Irish, although of British nationality.

=== Politics ===
Christian is a lifelong Labour voter. He has publicly opposed Brexit, saying on television that the campaign was all "based on lies" and arguing that a "no-deal Brexit" was "undeliverable" and that trusting Boris Johnson was like trusting "the captain of the Titanic to crash into the iceberg".
