= It's My Life (British TV programme) =

It's My Life is a British late night youth discussion programme broadcast on ITV and commissioned through its religious programmes department.

Presented by Terry Christian, the show was produced by Manchester-based independent producer Moore Television and designed to tackle the "moral dilemmas" faced by young people. Topics discussed included sexuality, drugs and alcohol, immigration, religion, politics and mental health.

It's My Life ran for six series on ITV from 2003 to 2008, and was recorded at Granada Studios in Manchester.

== Episodes ==
- Gay Relationships (10 March 2003)
- Sex and Boys (17 March 2003)
- Drugs & Clubs (31 March 2003)
- Marriage Teachers, Respect & Role Models (14 April 2003)
- Sex & Girls (21 April 2003)
- Episode #1.6 (19 May 2003)
- Episode #1.7 (26 May 2003)
- Women and Alcohol (6 October 2003)
- Tattoos and Piercings (20 October 2003)
- Immigration and Asylum Seekers (27 October 2003)
- Money and Ambition (10 November 2003)
- Religion: Who Needs It? (17 November 2003)
- Fame (19 July 2004)
- Gay Priests (26 July 2004)
- Politics (2 August 2004)
- Soaps and Dramas (9 August 2004)
- Terrorism (16 August 2004)
- Cosmetic Surgery (23 August 2004)
- Depression (30 August 2004)
- #2.8 (6 September 2004)
- #2.9 (4 October 2004)
- #2.10 (18 October 2004)
- #2.11 (1 November 2004)
- #2.12 (15 November 2004)
