= The Word (TV series) =

British television series, 1990 to 1995

- Directed by: Luke Campbell; Julia Knowles
- Presented by: Terry Christian; Mark Lamarr; Dani Behr; Alan Connor; Amanda de Cadenet; Huffty; Katie Puckrik; Jasmine Dotiwala; Michelle Collins
- Theme music composer: 808 State
- Opening theme: Olympic (Euro Bass Mix)
- Country of origin: United Kingdom
- Original language: English
- No. of series: 5
- No. of episodes: 104

Production
- Executive producer: Jane Buchanan
- Producers: Sean Borg; Paul Ross; Tamsin Summers; Asif Zubairy
- Production locations: Limehouse Studios (1990–92); Teddington Studios (1993–95)
- Running time: 60 minutes (inc. adverts)
- Production company: Planet 24

Original release
- Network: Channel 4
- Release: 24 August 1990 – 24 March 1995

Related
- The Girlie Show

The Word was a Channel 4 variety show in the United Kingdom that aired from 1990 to 1995.

== Format ==
The show's presenters included Terry Christian, comedian Mark Lamarr, Dani Behr, Katie Puckrik, Jasmine Dotiwala, Alan Connor, Amanda de Cadenet and Huffty. Originally broadcast in the old Tube time slot of 6 pm Friday evenings, The Word's main live show was shifted to a late-night timeslot from 9 November 1990. The magazine format allowed for interviews, live music, features and even game shows. The flexible late-night format meant that guests could do just about anything to be controversial.

There was also an 'I'll do anything to be on TV' section called "The Hopefuls" which ran for half of series 4 and half of series 5 in which people did generally repulsive things in order to get featured on the programme.

== Production ==
The show was the brainchild of Charlie Parsons and Terry Christian, the name of the show coming from Christian's page in the Manchester Evening News: "The Word Is Terry Christian". It started covering up-and-coming Manchester bands in the autumn of 1989, and appeared in the paper every Friday evening. The show originally had a working title of Club X2 and was originally produced for series 1 and 2 by the production company 24 Hour Productions, which later became Planet 24.

Paul Ross was the series editor on series 3 and 4, and became executive producer for series 5. Jo Whiley worked as a researcher/band booker on series 2 and half of series 3 and is credited as having given Nirvana their historic and notorious first TV appearance.

The programme ran for five series from 1990 to 1995. From the start, there was considerable tabloid backlash against the show. In mid 2000, Channel 4 screened a short-running compilation series titled Best of The Word, which mostly featured music performances.

Tango sponsored the show in 1994.

== Notable moments ==
- Nirvana's international television debut performance of "Smells Like Teen Spirit", with Kurt Cobain declaring Courtney Love to be "the best fuck in the world."
- Singer/guitarist Donita Sparks of L7 removing her jeans and underwear during a performance, the full-frontal nudity displayed when she drops her guitar being briefly broadcast.
- The TV debut of Oasis playing "Supersonic".
- Rage Against the Machine playing "Killing in the Name", resulting in a stage invasion with guitarist Tom Morello and singer Zack de la Rocha both being stopped from performing by the chaotic crowd.
- Lynne Perrie, best known for her role as Ivy Tilsley in soap opera Coronation Street, performing a tuneless rendition of the Gloria Gaynor song "I Will Survive".
- A very drunk Oliver Reed giving a barely coherent interview before performing "Wild Thing" by The Troggs with Ned's Atomic Dustbin."
- Shabba Ranks endorsing fellow dancehall artist Buju Banton, whos song Boom Baddy Bye endorses crucifixion of homosexuals, which met with universal condemnation including an onscreen retort from presenter Lamarr.
