= Celebrity Big Brother (British TV series) series 4 =

Coordinates: 51°39′23″N 0°16′02″W

Celebrity Big Brother
- Series 4
- Series four logo
- Presented by: Davina McCall
- No. of days: 23
- No. of housemates: 11
- Winner: Chantelle Houghton
- Runner-up: Michael Barrymore
- Companion shows: Big Brother's Little Brother; Big Brother's Big Mouth; Big Brother Live; Diary Room Uncut; Nominations Uncut
- No. of episodes: 23

Release
- Original network: Channel 4
- Original release: 5 January – 27 January 2006

Series chronology
- ← Previous; Series 3 Next → Series 5

Celebrity Big Brother 2006, also known as Celebrity Big Brother 4, is the fourth series of the British reality television series Celebrity Big Brother. It was hosted by Davina McCall and was broadcast on Channel 4 from 5 January 2006 until 27 January 2006, running for three weeks.

Eleven housemates entered the house on Launch Night, but only ten of them were being paid for their appearance. Chantelle Houghton, who was the first to enter the house, had actually auditioned for the sixth regular series the previous summer but was instead selected to enter the celebrity series. Her secret mission was to pretend she was a member of girl band Kandy Floss, and to convince the others that she was a genuine celebrity in order to remain in the house.

Controversies emerged during the run of the series, such as the participation of a sitting Member of Parliament (expelled Labour MP George Galloway, then-MP for Bethnal Green and Bow for Respect). Eighties pop star Pete Burns included a coat allegedly made from gorilla fur among his possessions; the coat was removed from the house on Day 16, following complaints from viewers and housemates. It was later discovered the coat was made from colobus monkey. No charges were brought forward as it was believed the coat was imported before colobus fur became illegal in 1975.

By the time of the series finale, six housemates remained in the house. This was a first in Big Brother UK history and the next regular series, Big Brother 7, also adopted this format. Houghton was voted the winner on Finale night and was awarded £25,000 for her victory. She was also crowned the first female winner of this series and Celebrity Big Brother.

Chantelle and fourth place finalist Preston took part in Ultimate Big Brother in 2010 and both made it to the final, with Preston finishing in sixth place and Chantelle finishing third. Jodie Marsh also returned to the house in 2012, as part of a task during Celebrity Big Brother 9.

== Format ==
Celebrity Big Brother is a game show in which a group of celebrity contestants, referred to as housemates, live in isolation from the outside world in a custom built "house", constantly under video surveillance. During their time in the House, the housemates are required to nominate two of their fellow contestants for potential eviction, and the two or more with the most votes would be nominated. This process is mandatory for all housemates, and failure to comply could result in expulsion from the House. The public then vote, with one of those celebrities evicted from the house. When the final week arrives, the viewers vote for which of the remaining celebrities should win the series, and the housemate with the most votes becomes the winner.

During their time in the House, housemates are given weekly tasks to perform. The housemates wager a portion of their weekly shopping budget on the task, and either win double their wagered fund or lose the wagered fund depending on their performance in the task. The housemates are required to work as a group to complete their tasks, with the format of the tasks varying based on the number of remaining housemates. Throughout the series, some housemates have been given secret tasks that must either be completed individually or with a small group; failure to do so can result in the housemate being nominated or punished in the House. Should the housemates run out of the food provided for them, an emergency ration was available to them. The housemates are forbidden from discussing nominations, and doing so could result in punishment. The format of the series is mainly seen as a social experiment, and requires housemates to interact with others who may have differing ideals, beliefs, and prejudices. Housemates are also required to make visits to the Diary Room during their stay in the House, where they are able to share their thoughts and feelings on their fellow housemates and the game.

== Housemates ==
Celebrity	Age on entry	Notability	Day entered	Day exited	Result
Chantelle Houghton	22	Non-celebrity	1	23	Winner
Michael Barrymore	53	Comedian and presenter	1	23	Runner-up
Maggot	29	Rapper	1	23	3rd place
Preston	23	Singer	1	23	4th place
Pete Burns	46	Singer	1	23	5th place
Traci Bingham	37	Actress and model	1	23	6th place
Dennis Rodman	44	Basketball player	1	21	Evicted
George Galloway	51	Politician and journalist	1	21	Evicted
Rula Lenska	58	Actress	1	16	Evicted
Faria Alam	39	Former football secretary	1	14	Evicted
Jodie Marsh	27	Glamour model	1	9	Evicted

=== Chantelle Houghton ===
Chantelle Houghton (born 21 August 1983, Wickford, England) was a non-celebrity housemate. Prior to entering, she worked in promotions and as a Paris Hilton lookalike. She had auditioned for Big Brother 6, but was instead chosen for the Celebrity series. Houghton was the first housemate to enter on Day 1 and was immediately told her secret mission: to pretend she was a real celebrity in a girl group called Kandy Floss. She managed to fool her housemates into believing this after they ranked her the ninth most famous housemate in a task on Day 4. She was crowned the winner in the series final, receiving 56.4% of the final vote. Houghton married fellow housemate Preston just months after the show, but they divorced ten months later. She also released an autobiography. In 2010, she appeared as a contestant in Ultimate Big Brother and finished third. She has spent a total of 41 days in the Big Brother House; 23 days for Celebrity Big Brother 4 and 18 days for Ultimate Big Brother.

=== Dennis Rodman ===
Dennis Rodman (born 13 May 1961, Trenton, New Jersey, USA) is a retired American professional National Basketball Association player of the Detroit Pistons, San Antonio Spurs, Chicago Bulls, Los Angeles Lakers and Dallas Mavericks. He was evicted on Day 21 with 23.5% of the vote. He exited the house smoking a cigar and wearing sunglasses and a cap which he refused to remove during the interview angering Davina McCall. He gave a confusing interview not answering direct questions which he also did for Dermot O'Leary whilst making a rude gesture, this caused him to be banned from the reunion. The following summer he appeared as a house guest on Love Island.

=== Faria Alam ===
Faria Alam (born 13 February 1966, Dhaka, Bangladesh) is a former Football Association secretary who, in 2004 had affairs with the then England football team manager, Sven-Goran Eriksson and FA chief executive Mark Palios, leading to Palios's resignation. She was booed on her way into the house and during her time there, she seemed to have an attraction to Dennis Rodman. Despite telling Big Brother in the Diary Room that she wanted to nominate herself for the second eviction, she was upset that her housemates nominated her and claimed that she would be evicted as the public would not allow a black or an Asian to win. She was evicted on Day 14 with 45% of the vote. During her interview, Davina jokingly asked her if she thought Sven might have voted to evict her. Despite her unpopularity with Big Brother fans she appeared on Big Brother's Little Brother and Big Brother's Big Mouth to positive receptions during Big Brother 7.

=== George Galloway ===
George Galloway (born 16 August 1954, Dundee, Scotland) is a politician and first became a member of parliament in 1987. During his time in CBB4, he was the Respect MP for Bethnal Green and Bow. He was booed on his entrance into the house. His participation in the show caused controversy, partially due to him being a sitting MP at the time of his entry into Big Brother - although, as the only MP of his party in the House of Commons, he did not take a whip. He consistently put a great deal of effort into the tasks assigned in the show, which included an incident, often re-shown, in which he pretended to be Rula Lenska's pet cat. Another task involving Galloway wearing a leotard also led to public derision by the British media. Galloway broadly aligned himself with Dennis Rodman and Pete Burns throughout the show. He referred to Jodie Marsh as a "wicked person" after she had an argument with Michael Barrymore, however he himself later had a heated altercation with Barrymore. He attacked Preston and Chantelle for their relationship, and though initially friendly with Rula Lenska, incurred her hostility upon the broadcast of his correspondence with Big Brother to the other housemates. Galloway said he was shocked at the lack of interest in politics from the younger housemates – particularly Chantelle, who referred to the House of Commons as "the place with the green seats" – he also said that he would be most famous housemate worldwide as he is known to every Muslim. On Day 17 the housemates decided that he could not nominate for continuous rule breaking. He was evicted on Day 21 with 65% of the vote. He presented Big Brother's Big Mouth in the first week of Big Brother 8, during the time that Emily was removed for saying the n-word.

=== Jodie Marsh ===
Jodie Marsh (born 23 December 1978, Brentwood) is an English glamour model and reality television personality. Before entering the house, she said she would hate to be locked up with Peter Andre, because she 'hates his missus' (Katie Price). She appeared to have no time for Faria Alam on launch night, as she did not believe Faria was a deserving celebrity. Jodie was by far the most unpopular with her fellow housemates, she was involved in a series of arguments with George Galloway, Michael Barrymore and Pete Burns, she received eight nominations on Day 5, and was evicted on Day 9 with 42% of the vote. She cried during her interview with Davina, whilst she reflected on her time in the house. Jodie claimed on finale night that she would not be appearing on any more reality shows, however she has since appeared on her own reality show, Totally Jodie Marsh, and even had the wedding of her short-lived marriage broadcast on MTV. She has since regularly appeared on Big Brother's Little Brother and Big Brother's Big Mouth. She and Chantelle did not continue their friendship once they left the house. She also appeared in 2012 as judge for a body building task.

=== Maggot ===
Maggot (born Andrew Major, Wales) is a Welsh rapper from the band Goldie Lookin' Chain, he finished in third place on the finale, receiving 23.5% of the vote. When he entered the house it was reported that he was 24, however he stated on Richard & Judy in early 2006 that he was actually 29.

=== Michael Barrymore ===
Michael Barrymore (born Michael Ciaran Parker 4 May 1952, Bermondsey, London, England) is an English comedian. This was seen by many as his comeback since the body of Stuart Lubbock was found dead in his swimming pool on 31 March 2001. He was initially the bookies' favourite to win, but lost support due to his arguments with Jodie Marsh, however he won back many fans after his row with George Galloway. He finished in second place on finale, receiving 43.6% of the final vote.

=== Pete Burns ===
Pete Burns (5 August 1959 – 23 October 2016) was an English singer-songwriter and frontman of the dance/pop band Dead or Alive, best known for their number one single "You Spin Me Round (Like a Record)" in 1985. After he claimed in the house that his coat was made of gorilla skin, police removed the coat from the house, without his knowledge or consent, for testing. Ownership of products made from gorilla is illegal in the United Kingdom without a licence. Tests found that the coat was in fact made of Colobus monkey, another endangered species. As a result, the case was passed to the Crown Prosecution Service who determined that the pelts used to make the coat were imported before 1975, when it became illegal to import Colobus fur, and as such will not be pressing charges. This greatly upset animal rights campaigners. Burns was known for his 'acid tongue' and his verbal tirades against Jodie Marsh and Traci Bingham. He finished in fifth place on the finale, receiving 13.6% of the vote. He received a hostile reception on his exit. He later appeared on more reality shows, and presented Big Brothers Big Mouth for a week in August 2007 during Big Brother 8. Burns appeared on Davina's final send off which aired on the last night of Ultimate Big Brother performing "You Spin Me Round (Like a Record)". He died on 23 October 2016 from cardiac arrest.

=== Preston ===
Preston (born Samuel Preston, 16 January 1982, Worthing, West Sussex, England) was the lead singer of The Ordinary Boys when he entered the house. His time in the house is best remembered for his blossoming romance with Chantelle, even though he was engaged to long-term French girlfriend Camille Aznar. He celebrated his 24th birthday in the house. He finished in fourth place on the finale, receiving 16.7% of the vote.

=== Rula Lenska ===
Rula Lenska (born Countess Roza-Marie Leopoldyna Lubienska 30 September 1947, St. Neots, Cambridgeshire, England) is an English-born actress of Polish extraction, best known for her television work and marriage to Dennis Waterman. The oldest housemate, she was seen as the mother of the house and would often comfort the younger housemates if they were feeling down. She was the winner of the box task and had to wear the Pants of Power, by keeping them on over her trousers she was allowed to automatically nominate one housemate for the second eviction, she chose Pete, had she taken off the pants she would have automatically faced eviction. Her defining moment in the house was her role-play in the task, where she and George Galloway imitated a cat and his owner. Despite their friendship, George – along with Preston during their punishment for rule-breaking – nominated Rula on Day 14, it was also broadcast to the entire house. Rula was evicted on Day 16 after receiving 50% of the vote.

In an interview after leaving the house, she expressed her anger at Pete Burns for his unfriendliness towards her and laughed off any suggestion that she fancied George.

=== Traci Bingham ===
Traci Bingham (born 13 January 1968, Cambridge, Massachusetts, USA) is an American actress, model and television personality. She is best known for playing the role of Jordan Tate on Baywatch from 1996 to 1998, She was also the first black actress to appear on Baywatch. She recognised Dennis Rodman straightaway, and the first words he spoke to her were "Get away from me, Traci" followed by "are you not divorced yet", however they appeared to be on good terms in the house. She was on the receiving end of Pete Burns's sharp tongue on Day 14 and many housemates criticised her for being "too nice". She celebrated her 38th birthday in the house, however as her birthday fell on Friday the 13th she had to stay locked in the bedroom until midnight. She finished in sixth place, receiving 5.3% of the vote. She has since appeared on more reality shows, such as The Surreal Life: Fame Games – where she won the $100,000 Goldenplace.net Grand Prize. She also appeared on Fox's Gimme My Own Reality Show!

=== Guest appearances ===
Name	Occupation	Reason for appearance
Jimmy Savile	TV veteran	visited on 14 and 15 January as part of a task
Richard and Judy	Television chat show hosts	As part of 'You Say, We Pay'

== Nominations table ==
	Day 5	Day 12	Day 15	Day 17	Day 23 Final		Nominations received
Chantelle	Rula, George	Dennis, Michael	Not eligible	George, Dennis	Winner (Day 23)		5
Michael	Dennis, Jodie	Faria, George	Not eligible	Dennis, Pete	Runner-up (Day 23)		3
Maggot	Pete, Jodie	Faria, Pete	Not eligible	Pete, George	Third place (Day 23)		1
Preston	George, Faria	Traci, Dennis	Traci, Maggot, Rula	George, Dennis	Fourth place (Day 23)		2
Pete	Jodie, George	Rula, Chantelle	Not eligible	Traci, Chantelle	Fifth place (Day 23)		9
Traci	Jodie, Preston	George, Michael	Not eligible	George, Chantelle	Sixth place (Day 23)		4
Dennis	Preston, Jodie	Chantelle, Rula	Not eligible	Chantelle, Michael	Evicted (Day 21)		8
George	Jodie, Pete	Traci, Faria	Traci, Maggot, Rula	Banned	Evicted (Day 21)		10
Rula	Dennis, Jodie	Pete	Not eligible	Evicted (Day 16)			4
Faria	Jodie, Pete	Pete, Dennis	Evicted (Day 14)				4
Jodie	Pete, George	Evicted (Day 9)					8
Notes	none	1	2	3	4		
Against public vote	George, Jodie, Pete	Dennis, Faria, Pete	Maggot, Rula, Traci	Chantelle, Dennis, George	Chantelle, Maggot, Michael, Pete, Preston, Traci		
Evicted	Jodie; 41.7% to evict	Faria; 45.2% to evict	Rula; 49.7% to evict	George; 64.7% to evict	Traci; 5.3% (out of 6)	Maggot; 23.5% (out of 3)	
Evicted	Jodie; 41.7% to evict	Faria; 45.2% to evict	Rula; 49.7% to evict	George; 64.7% to evict	Pete; 13.6% (out of 5)	Maggot; 23.5% (out of 3)	
Evicted	Jodie; 41.7% to evict	Faria; 45.2% to evict	Rula; 49.7% to evict	George; 64.7% to evict	Pete; 13.6% (out of 5)	Michael; 43.6% (out of 2)	
Evicted	Jodie; 41.7% to evict	Faria; 45.2% to evict	Rula; 49.7% to evict	Dennis; 23.5% to evict	Preston; 16.7% (out of 4)	Michael; 43.6% (out of 2)	
Evicted	Jodie; 41.7% to evict	Faria; 45.2% to evict	Rula; 49.7% to evict	Dennis; 23.5% to evict	Chantelle; 56.4% to win		

Notes

- ^Note 1: Rula, as wearer of the Pants of Power after winning the 'box task', had to choose one Housemate to automatically face the public vote. She chose Pete.
- ^Note 2: George and Preston, after breaking the rules regarding the discussion of nominations, they were both called to the Diary Room to nominate three of their fellow housemates together. They were unaware at the time that what they were saying was being fed live into the house on the plasma screen. They chose Maggot, Rula and Traci.
- ^Note 3: Before nominations took place, Big Brother held a ballot to decide whether George should be permitted to nominate, as he once again had discussed nominations with a fellow Housemate, breaking a fundamental Big Brother rule for the third time. Whilst nominations took place, George was not called to the diary room, showing he lost the vote. The eviction on Day 21 was a double eviction.
- ^Note 4: The public were voting for the Housemate they wanted to win rather than to evict.

== Summary ==
Day 1	Entrances	Chantelle, Michael, Pete, Traci, Maggot, Rula, Jodie, Dennis, Faria, Preston and George entered the House.
Day 1	Tasks	Upon entering the House, Chantelle was given a secret mission. She had to convince the other celebrities that she was a pop star, and the lead singer of the girl band Kandy Floss, of which their biggest single was called "I Want It Right Now." If she passed, she would be allowed to stay; if she failed, she would be evicted.
Day 2	General	Pete sparked controversy when his fellow housemates saw a fur coat made of endangered animal skin
Day 2	Tasks	The housemates were told to split into two teams. Dennis, Faria, George, Pete, and Preston were on one team and Chantelle, Jodie, Maggot, Rula, and Traci were on the other. Michael was the quizmaster. Both teams were asked questions about the housemates in the house. Chantelle, Jodie, Maggot, Rula, and Traci won the task and received a party while the other team had to watch them from outside.
Day 3	Tasks	All the housemates had to participate in a talent show. Chantelle performed her Kandy Floss hit single 'I Want it Right Now'. Dennis spun a ball on one finger, Rula acted out a scene from Macbeth, Traci did a 'slow-mo' Baywatch style run, Michael did a comedy act, Pete, Preston, and Maggot also sang their hit songs and Faria, George, and Jodie gave 90-second speeches of why they were famous.
Day 4	General	An argument set off while the housemates were preparing the shopping list.
Day 4	Tasks	The celebrities were given two minutes to rank themselves in order of fame. The real task was for Chantelle to avoid being the least famous celebrity in the house. As she ranked the 9th most famous housemate (over Preston and Maggot), Chantelle was allowed to stay in the Big Brother House, and allowed to compete to become the winner. An inauguration party was thrown by Big Brother for her, and Big Brother asked Chantelle for her autograph.
Day 6	Tasks	Big Brother had set the housemates a scientific task. Does spinach make you stronger? Does classical music make you brainy? Can eating a box of liqueurs send you over the drink drive limit? Can you learn Japanese in your sleep? Does talking to plants make them grow quickly? Can you make yourself unlucky? Can humans communicate with animals?
Day 6	Nominations	Housemates nominated for the first time. Jodie, George, and Pete received the most nominations and faced the public vote.
Day 7	General	Faria and Dennis had a row about her affair with Sven-Goran Eriksson and how she sold her story to the press. Traci, Pete, Dennis and George were reprimanded for discussing nominations.
Day 8	General	Michael started an attack at Jodie and Chantelle after Faria told Michael that Jodie, Chantelle, and herself were annoyed that he had eaten the vegetarian quorn and they wouldn't be able to eat anything if he had it.
Day 9	Exits	Jodie was the first housemate evicted from the house after receiving 42% of the public vote to evict.
Day 9	General	Traci had a birthday party with a Friday the 13th theme but she was not allowed to attend until midnight.
Day 10	General	The housemates took part in the box task, but they eventually all settled and allowed Rula to win the prize, the Pants of Power, which gave her the ability to automatically nominate a housemate to face eviction.Jimmy Savile entered and as a Jim'll Fix It theme they had to ask for something fixed.
Day 11	General	Jimmy returned and fixed things for them. Pete got a video message from home, Dennis won pampering equipment and goody bags for everyone etc.
Day 12	Nominations	Housemates nominated for the second time. Dennis and Faria received the most nominations and faced the public vote. Rula, as the wearer of the pants of power, had to nominate someone else to be up for eviction. She chose Pete and he joined Dennis and Faria facing the public vote.
Day 12	General	It was Preston's birthday and they had a party with a Mod and rocker theme.
Day 13	General	An argument started after Faria said the UK were racial and a black or Asian person would never win a competition like Big Brother.
Day 14	Tasks	Housemates had to paint a self-portrait from inside and outside of themselves.
Day 14	Exits	Faria was the second housemate evicted from the house after receiving 45% of the public vote to evict.
Day 14	Punishments	George and Preston were punished for discussing nominations the previous day and had to choose 3 people to face eviction. They chose Traci, Maggot, and Rula to face eviction.
Day 14	General	Pete started to attack Traci after she said she loved him and he said she was using the wrong word.
Day 16	General	Pete's gorilla coat was confiscated and handed to the police for tests.
Day 16	Exits	Rula was the third housemate evicted from the house after receiving 50% of the public vote to evict.
Day 17	Punishments	George yet again discussed nominations and housemates had to hold a ballot if he was allowed to nominate or not. He lost the vote and was banned from nominations.
Day 17	Nominations	Housemates nominated for the fourth and final time. Chantelle, Dennis, and George received the most nominations and faced the public vote.
Day 17	Tasks	Housemates had to describe emotions in pairs using dance.
Day 18	Tasks	As part of their final shopping task, housemates had to work for the Big Brother Bank. Because they answered a ringing phone, Chantelle and Preston were made the board of directors and were given special access to a private room next to the Diary Room. They were told that their task was to pass two of three tasks. However, the real task was for the other housemates, who were bankers, to fail two of the three tasks.
Day 20	General	Pete, Dennis, and George had an argument with Michael, Preston, and Chantelle.
Day 21	Exits	George was the fourth housemate to be evicted from the house receiving 65% of the public vote to evict.; Dennis was the fifth housemate to be evicted from the house receiving 23.5% of the public vote to evict..
Day 23	Exits	Traci left the house in sixth place. Pete left the house in fifth place. Preston left the house in fourth place. Maggot left the house in third place. Chantelle was revealed to be the winner, leaving Michael as the runner-up.

== Production ==
=== Eye logo ===
The eye used for the series was the same eye used for Big Brother 6 the previous summer, the only modification being a star used to replace the pupil, in keeping with the celebrity theme.

=== Broadcasts ===
Davina McCall once again hosted the live launch, eviction shows and finale, all broadcast on Channel 4, nightly highlight shows were broadcast on Channel 4, narrated by Marcus Bentley. Big Brother's Little Brother was moved to an early morning time slot on Channel 4, but kept its Sunday lunchtime slot as per each series, Dermot O'Leary remained as host.

On E4, live coverage once again dominated its daily and nightly schedule, this was the first series to be broadcast since E4 Music became part of the daytime schedule rather than an intermission, E4 Music was rested throughout Celebrity Big Brother 4's run. Diary Room Uncut and Nominations Uncut also returned on E4, this would be Nominations Uncut's final series. Russell Brand also returned as host of Big Brother's Big Mouth which for the first time had been moved to a late night slot, being broadcast on E4, straight after the Channel 4 highlights show, this would remain its regular time slot until Ultimate Big Brother in 2010, where Big Brother's Big Mouth was retired.

=== Sponsor ===
Carphone Warehouse were this year's sponsors.

=== Prize money ===
Chantelle Houghton was not being paid for her participation, however as she won the show, she was awarded £25,000.

== House ==
The house remained largely unchanged since the previous summer. The only modifications made were mainly in the garden. With the grass being replaced by AstroTurf, the swimming pool becoming an indoor swimming pool and the outdoor showers being removed. In the bedroom, a private shower was placed beside the toilet. Unlike the previous celebrity series where there was a camera in the shower, this year returned to having no camera in the shower for the celebrity series.

== Viewership ==
Official ratings are taken from BARB.

	Official viewers (millions)			
	Week 1		Week 2	Week 3
Saturday		3.73	3.25	4
Sunday		3.44	4.89	4.93
Sunday		4.59	4.89	4.93
Monday		4.03	4.24	5.15
Tuesday		4.44	5.24	5.71
Wednesday		4.53	4.89	6.16
Wednesday		4.53	4.89	4.05
Thursday	6.68	4.54	4.97	5.35
Friday	4.39	5.44	4.96	6.09
Friday	4.39	5.44	4.96	7.31
Weekly average	4.58		4.63	5.42
Running average	4.58		4.6	4.88
Series average	4.88			
blue-coloured boxes denote live shows.

== Ranking of fame ==
On Day 4, the housemates were asked to arrange themselves in order of fame from most famous to least. Chantelle had to avoid being the least famous in the line-up to remain. She succeeded as both Preston and Maggot ranked themselves as less famous. Michael Barrymore immediately placed himself at number 1 and refused to move despite there being some debate among the housemates as to whether he or Dennis Rodman was the most famous, given that Barrymore is very famous in the UK while Rodman has a higher profile in the US and probably globally. George Galloway argued that Michael should be ranked first, it being a British show. He also later suggested, in a conversation with Rula, that globally he may have the most fame, claiming that most of the 1.3 billion Muslims in the world know of him. Michael later threw a massive tantrum, seemingly targeting Jodie because she had suggested that both Dennis and Traci would be more famous than Michael globally. The housemates ranked themselves as follows:

1. Michael
2. Dennis
3. Pete
4. George
5. Traci
6. Rula
7. Jodie
8. Faria
9. Chantelle
10. Preston
11. Maggot

== Controversy ==
=== Pete Burns' coat ===
Pete sparked controversy whilst in the house when he claimed that his coat was made of gorilla skin. This animal is an endangered species. Following complaints from viewers, the police came in and took the coat from the house for testing. The tests found that the coat was actually made of Colobus monkey, another endangered species. The case was passed to the Crown Prosecution Service, who determined that the pelts used to make the coat were imported before 1975, when it became illegal to import Colobus fur, and as such will not be pressing charges.

=== Faria Alam's claims of racism ===
On Day 13, Faria Alam who had just discovered she had been nominated for eviction, became upset and stated that she would be evicted on the grounds that she is Asian. She commented that the British public would not allow a Black or Asian person to win the show, nor would the media allow it. She was evicted the following day.
