= Chantelle Houghton =

British television personality (born 1983)

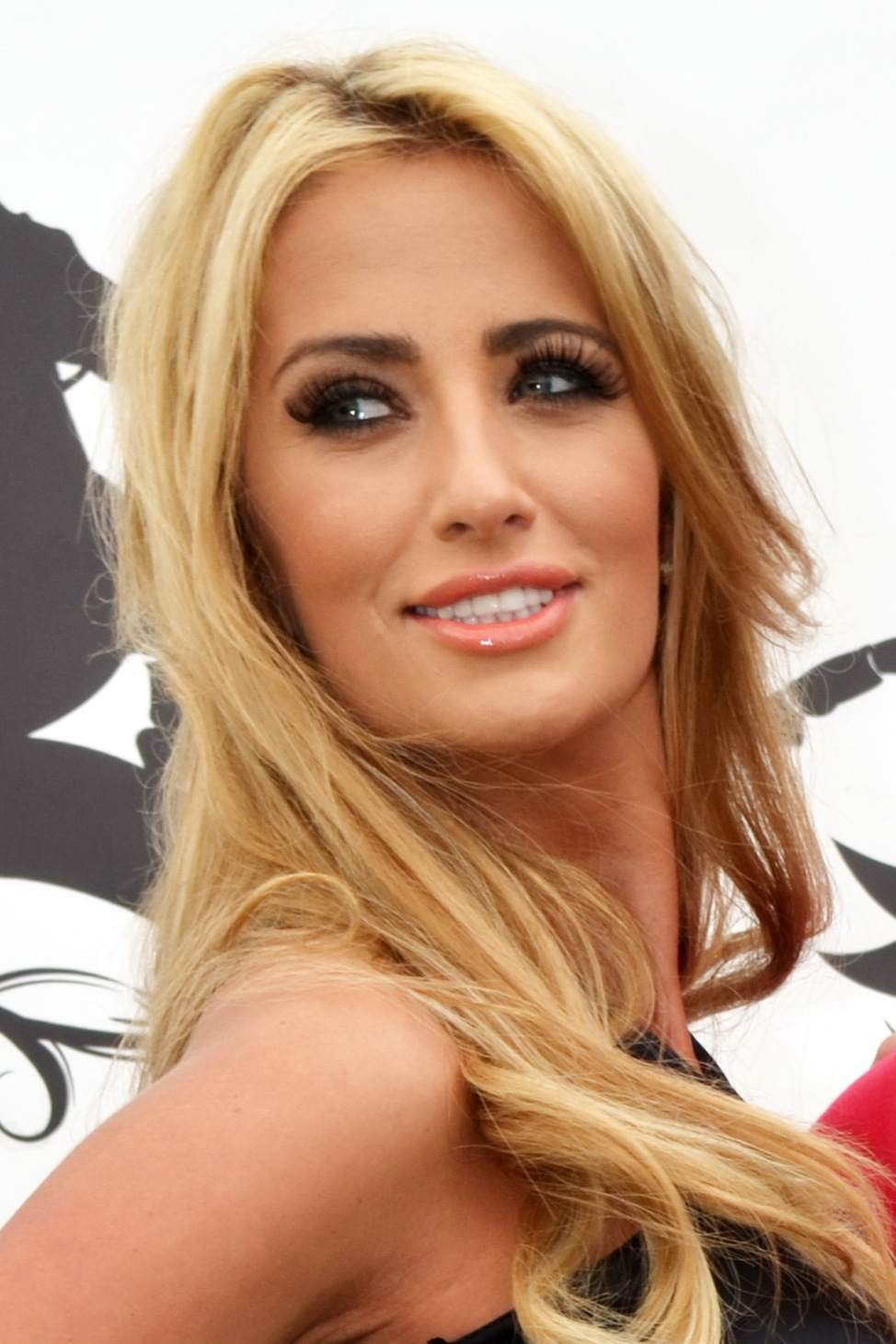
- Houghton in 2011
- Born: Chantelle Vivien Houghton; 21 August 1983 (age 43); Wickford, Essex, England
- Occupations: Television personality; glamour model
- Years active: 1998–present
- Television: Celebrity Big Brother; Ultimate Big Brother
- Spouse: Preston (m. 2006; div. 2007)
- Partners: Rav Wilding (2010–2011); Alex Reid (2011–2012)
- Children: 1

Chantelle Vivien Houghton (born 21 August 1983) is an English television personality and glamour model. In 2006, she won the fourth series of the Channel 4 reality series Celebrity Big Brother.

Houghton was sent in as a non-celebrity with the task of persuading her celebrity housemates that she was famous. She emerged as the winner of the series, winning a prize of £25,000. She also became the first female to win Celebrity Big Brother. Following a much-publicised on-screen relationship, Houghton married former fellow Big Brother contestant Samuel Preston of The Ordinary Boys in August 2006.

== Early life ==
Houghton was born on 21 August 1983 in Wickford, Essex, to her parents Allan and Vivien, and has an older brother, Gregg. She attended Bromfords School in Wickford, the same school that Big Brother 8 winner Brian Belo attended several years later. She left school at age 15 with seven GCSEs, then worked in a bank and as an insurance telesales representative.

== Career ==
=== Modelling ===
After various friends suggested she would make a good model, Houghton entered a 2001 competition run by Motor Cycle News magazine, and after winning it became a grid promotions girl. Wanting to be like her heroine Jordan, she undertook some glamour modelling starting out by having her mother take some topless shots in a local park. In 2003, she entered a Daily Star competition as a Page 3 girl, which she did not win, but appeared once in the tabloid newspaper.

Houghton appeared as a Soccerette model on the Soccer AM show for Sky Sports and also worked for a lookalike agency, portraying Paris Hilton. In 2005, she competed in a Miss Greater London beauty pageant, where she lost to Jenny Velasquez.

=== Celebrity Big Brother 2006 / Ultimate Big Brother 2010 ===
Houghton had originally applied to be in Big Brother 6 and was a stand-by for that series but was never called up, however producers decided to use her for the upcoming celebrity version as a "fake celebrity".

Houghton entered the house on day one and became the first non-celebrity to enter Celebrity Big Brother. She was told by Big Brother that her cover story was that she was a member of a fictional band called Kandy Floss. According to Big Brother, Houghton was the lead singer. Their singles were "I Want It Right Now", "Come Back", and "More More More". "I Want It Right Now" was their biggest hit. Had she failed to convince them, she would have been evicted from the house. She successfully fooled her housemates and survived to the end of the show. In her Big Brother profile page Houghton described herself as a "bright, blonde bimbo" (despite not being a natural blonde). She said, "I look like Paris Hilton, not on purpose but it's just the way it turned out".

On 8 January (day four), Big Brother set a task to the group to rate themselves by how famous they thought they were. The celebrity they thought was the most famous stood on the No. 1 podium and the person they considered the least famous stood on the No. 11 podium. Houghton had to avoid being put in the No. 11 podium to prove she had fooled the real celebrities that she was famous and to stay in the house. Houghton survived the task, being chosen to stand on the No. 9 podium, ahead of Samuel Preston and Maggot, who insisted on placing themselves last (they apparently realised she was not in the music business as they were). She was then called to the diary room to discuss her identity with Big Brother. This was simultaneously shown on a television screen in the lounge, in front of the other housemates.

Houghton was nominated for eviction on Day 21, but was saved from eviction by the public as the other two nominees (George Galloway and Dennis Rodman) left the house in a double eviction. While in the house, Houghton established close bonds with Jodie Marsh and Preston.

Houghton won the show on 27 January with 56.4% of the public vote, ahead of Michael Barrymore on 22.7%, earning her £25,000 (the celebrities were reportedly paid fees of up to £150,000 each). She disclosed to the We Need To Talk, podcast in 2026, that she had 80p in her bank account when she entered the house; the day after she won, she attended the frenzied media-round and was paid £250,000, and within six-months of leaving the house, her earnings had reached £1m. She meticulously documented her income, in her personal diary.

Houghton re-entered the Big Brother house for Ultimate Big Brother, following the conclusion of Big Brother 2010, and to signal the end of Big Brother on Channel 4. She entered the house with her ex-husband Preston. During the show, Houghton reformed the fake band Kandy Floss with fellow Ultimate Big Brother housemates Victor Ebuwa and Nadia Almada for a task. Houghton survived eviction on Day 11 and subsequently landed third place on the finale with 20.51% of the final three-way vote on Day 18, finishing behind Nikki Grahame and winner Brian Dowling.

=== Media career ===
Houghton also had her own post-Big Brother show called Chantelle: Living the Dream.

In May 2006, she signed a £400,000 deal with Random House to publish her autobiography. It was released in October 2006, titled Living the Dream and sold 5,000 copies by the end of 2006. Extracts from the book were read out by host Simon Amstell on 14 February 2007, edition of Never Mind the Buzzcocks, causing Preston a guest on the show, to angrily react by walking off the set to reunite with Houghton, who had been waiting for him in the shows Green room.

Houghton was nominated in the Most Popular TV Contender category at the 2006 National Television Awards, but was beaten by Nikki Grahame, herself a former Big Brother contestant.

Houghton has written several columns in magazines, most notably as OK!'s Big Brother 7 columnist and New!'s Big Brother 8 columnist. Before becoming New!'s BB8 columnist, she used to write another column in the magazine titled "I Want It Right Now" in which she shared makeup and fashion tips.

In June 2010, Houghton fronted a campaign for People for the Ethical Treatment of Animals, called 'Fight Impotence. Go Vegetarian'.

In September that year, Houghton was named as the new face of the La Senza underwear range.

Houghton has appeared as a guest on several TV shows since winning Celebrity Big Brother. These include:

- Channel 4's The Friday Night Project on 10 and 17 February 2006 as a co-presenter to Alan Carr and Justin Lee Collins, replacing Debra Stephenson, due to her heavy filming schedule for Coronation Street.
- TV3's The Brendan Courtney Show when she jetted in-and-out of Dublin in a matter of hours.
- Channel 4's 8 Out of 10 Cats, as a celebrity contestant on 10 March 2006
- ITV1's The Mint, as a special guest
- BBC's The Weakest Link, as a celebrity contestant on 5 May 2006, which also featured some reality TV stars Michael Barrymore and Russell Grant; and Big Brother's Big Mouth on 17 August 2006, during the final week of the seventh series of Big Brother.
- CBBC's Comic Relief does Beat the Boss, alongside Dragons' Den star Duncan Bannatyne and comedian Joe Pasquale
- ITV's GMTV, for an interview in November 2007
- ITV1's Call Me a Cabbie as a trainee in 2007
- BBC One's Hotel Babylon as the girlfriend of Chris Moyles.
- BBC Three's Snog Marry Avoid? on 16 February 2009
- Big Brother spin-off show Big Brother's Bit on the Side for Channel 5.
- Come Dine with Me for Channel 4, broadcast from 10 to 14 October 2011

=== Discography ===
- Big Brother - Kandy Floss (I Want It All)

== Personal life ==
Houghton announced her engagement to Preston on 11 April 2006. In an exclusive £300,000 deal each with OK! magazine, they were married on 25 August 2006 at Dartmouth House in Mayfair, London.

After their honeymoon, the couple moved to Preston's flat in Brighton. In a later 2008 interview with Piers Morgan, Houghton admitted that Preston had told her one month after the wedding that he had not wanted to marry her. The couple continued to give interviews to various magazines, with Houghton losing weight and colouring her hair brunette to look more like Preston's former fiancée Camille.

Ten months later, on 27 June 2007, they announced in a joint statement that they were ending their marriage. "After much soul-searching and tearful discussions we have sadly decided to end our marriage," they said in the statement. "We hope we can always remain friends and still love each other but we both think we put so much pressure on one another to make our marriage work that it has ended up destroying our relationship. No one else is involved in our decision." The couple divorced in November 2007.

Houghton was in a relationship with British television presenter Rav Wilding. The couple separated in 2011.

Houghton confirmed that she was pregnant by competitive fighter Alex Reid in November 2011. On 17 June 2012, Houghton gave birth to a daughter. The couple separated in October 2012. In 2026, Houghton confirmed that she has been in a relationship with garden centre owner, Westley O'Bryan since 2025.

== Filmography ==
Television
| Year | Title | Role | Notes |
|---|---|---|---|
| 2006 | Celebrity Big Brother UK series 4 | Self; housemate | Winner, 23 episodes |
| 2006 | Celebrity Big Brother's Big Mouth | Self; housemate | 1 episode |
| 2006 | Graham Norton's Bigger Picture | Self; guest | 1 episode |
| 2006 | Ministry of Mayhem | Self; guest | 1 episode |
| 2006 | T4 | Self; guest | 1 episode |
| 2006 | Soccer AM | Self; guest | 1 episode |
| 2006 | GMTV | Self; guest | 2 episodes |
| 2006 | The Brendan Courtney Show | Self; guest | 1 episode |
| 2006 | 8 Out of 10 Cats | Self; guest | 1 episode |
| 2006 | E4 Music Zone | Self; guest presenter | 2 episodes |
| 2006 | Chantelle: Living the Dream | Self; cast member | 6 episodes |
| 2006 | Top of the Pops: Reloaded | Self; guest | 1 episode |
| 2006 | The Mint | Self; contestant | 1 episode |
| 2006 | Chantelle's: Dream Dates | Self; presenter | 6 episodes |
| 2006 | The Prince's Trust 30th Birthday Live | Self; audience member | TV special |
| 2006 | Friday Night with Jonathan Ross | Self; guest | 1 episode |
| 2006 | The Weakest Link | Self; contestant | 1 episode |
| 2006 | T4 on the Beach 2006 | Self; guest | TV special |
| 2006 | Sport Relief 2006 | Self; guest | TV special |
| 2006 | The Friday Night Project | Self; guest | 3 episodes |
| 2006 | The Paul O'Grady Show | Self; guest | 1 episode |
| 2006 | The National Television Awards | Self; audience member | TV special |
| 2006 | TMi | Self; guest | 1 episode |
| 2006 | Viewer of the Year 2006 | Self; audience member | TV special |
| 2006 | Richard & Judy | Self; guest | 1 episode |
| 2006-2008 | Big Brother's Little Brother | Self; ex-housemate | 2 episodes |
| 2006-2020 | This Morning | Self; guest | 6 episodes |
| 2006-2012 | Loose Women | Self; guest | 4 episodes |
| 2007 | Comic Relief 2007: The Big One | Self; guest | TV special |
| 2007 | The BAFTA TV Awards 2007 | Self; audience member | TV special |
| 2007 | Hell's Kitchen | Self; customer | 1 episode |
| 2007 | Pete's PA | Self; guest | 1 episode |
| 2007 | Hotel Babylon | Girlfriend | 1 episode |
| 2007 | Another Audience with Al Murray | Self; audience member | TV special |
| 2007 | Call Me A Cabbie season 2 | Self; contestant | 6 episodes |
| 2008 | The Dark Side of Fame with Piers Morgan | Self; guest | 1 episode |
| 2009 | Snog Marry Avoid? | Self; contestant | 1 episode |
| 2009 | Don't Call Me Stupid! | Self; guest | 1 episode |
| 2009 | Whatever It Takes | Chantelle | TV film |
| 2009 | The Most Annoying People of 2009 | Self; commentator | TV special |
| 2010 | Stand Up for the Week | Self; guest | 1 episode |
| 2010 | Ultimate Big Brother | Self; housemate | 3rd place, 22 episodes |
| 2010 | The Vanessa Show | Self; guest | 1 episode |
| 2011 | Celebrity Total Wipeout | Self; contestant | 1 episode |
| 2011 | The Saturday Night Show | Self; guest | 1 episode |
| 2011 | Celebrity Come Dine with Me | Self; contestant | 5 episodes |
| 2011-2013 | Big Brother's Bit on the Side | Self; ex-housemate | 3 episodes |
| 2012 | Daybreak | Self; guest | 1 episode |
| 2015 | Screenwipe | Self; guest | 1 episode |
| 2016 | Bodyshockers | Self; guest | 1 episode |
| 2020 | Celebrity: A 21st Century Story | Self; feature | TV special |
| 2026 | Good Morning Britain | Self; guest | 1 episode |

| Preceded by Bez | Celebrity Big Brother UK Winner; Series 4 (2006) | Succeeded by Shilpa Shetty |
