= Six Men's Bay, Barbados =

Village in Barbados

Coordinates: 13°16′N 59°38′W

Six Men's Bay is a fishing village located to the south of Maycock's Bay in the northwest of Barbados, north of the town of Speightstown. Just off shore of the bay, in 18 metres (60 ft) of water, rests the 50 metres (165 ft) long wreck of a sunken freighter named Pamir (not the same as sailing vessel Pamir), a spot for scuba diving.

The bay is the largest remaining coastal pond on Barbados' west coast.
