= Luvvie =

Luvvie may refer to:

- Luvvie Darling, a fictional character in the comic Viz
- Luvvies, a regular mini-section in the magazine Private Eye
- Luvvie Ajayi, writer and comedian
- The Luvvies, a spoof awards show
