= Jodie Marsh =

English glamour model and television personality (born 1978)

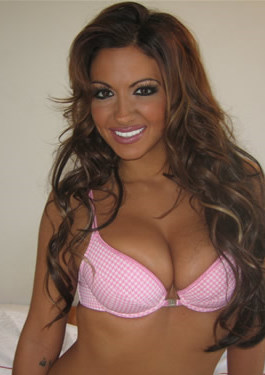
- Marsh in 2005
- Born: Jodie Louisa Marsh; 23 December 1978 (age 47); Brentwood, Essex, England
- Education: Brentwood School, Essex
- Occupations: Media personality; model; bodybuilder
- Spouses: Matt Peacock (m. 2007; div. 2007) James Placido (m. 2015; div. 2016)
- Relatives: Alex Walkinshaw (cousin)

Jodie Louisa Marsh (born 23 December 1978) is an English former glamour model, bodybuilder, and media and television personality. She has appeared on numerous reality television shows, including Essex Wives (2002), Back to Reality (2004), Love on a Saturday Night (2004), Celebrity Big Brother (2006, 2012), and Big Brother's Bit on the Side (2011–2013). She also featured in her own reality show titled Totally Jodie Marsh (2007).

Marsh began glamour modelling in 2002 on Page 3 of The Sun, for which she appeared six times in total. Her autobiography, Keeping It Real, reached the top 10 on The Sunday Times Bestseller List. She is also known for her tattoos and natural bodybuilding. Marsh has since retired from modelling, and she currently operates an animal sanctuary in Great Dunmow, Essex.

== Early life ==
Jodie Marsh was born on 23 December 1978 in Brentwood, Essex to John Marsh and Kristina Marsh, who owned a scaffolding business. She has one brother.

Marsh was educated at the independent Brentwood School. She acquired 11A*-A grade GCSEs at school, followed by three A-levels. She has spoken extensively about her experiences of being bullied at school, which began when she was 11. She had rhinoplasty aged 16 after experiencing bullying for her nose, which she broke in a hockey accident.

== Modelling career ==
Following her appearance on Essex Wives, Marsh modelled for The Sun's Page 3, which she appeared on six times in total.

In June 2009, Marsh made her debut on the cover of Zoo Weekly; she also appeared in a number of subsequent issues. She also worked with – and appeared in – magazines such as FHM, Loaded, Playboy UK, and Nuts.

In 2023, she stated that she has an OnlyFans account to raise money for her animal sanctuary.

== Television career ==
Marsh was working as a stripper at Stringfellows gentlemen's club in London when she appeared in the documentary television series Essex Wives in 2002. This led to a number of modelling jobs. She has subsequently participated in many reality television shows, including Trust Me – I'm a Holiday Rep, Channel 4's The Games and E4's Fool Around... with Jodie Marsh on two occasions.

In mid-2008 she had a cameo role in the first episode of Channel 4's Friday night comedy show The Kevin Bishop Show.

In January 2006, Marsh appeared on Celebrity Big Brother 4. Marsh's treatment by other contestants provoked debate about whether Marsh was being bullied. Australian feminist writer and ex-Big Brother contestant Germaine Greer wrote a comment piece for The Guardian accusing the show's production company Endemol, presenter Davina McCall, and Marsh's fellow housemates, particularly George Galloway, of bullying. On 13 January, she was the first to be voted out of the Big Brother house with 8 out of 10 possible nominations from her fellow housemates, and 42 percent of the public vote. She later appeared on spinoff shows including: Big Brother's Little Brother, Big Brother's Big Mouth and Big Brother's EForum.

The same year, Marsh competed on the celebrity edition of BBC One's The Weakest Link. Marsh appeared as a contestant in Channel Five's reality show The All Star Talent Show in September 2006. Following this, Marsh began presenting her own series, Get A Life for Living TV on 1 March 2007; it was cancelled after two episodes.

In May 2007, the website Marry Me Jodie Marsh was launched with the teaser "I'm getting married this September... Only problem is that I don't have a man!" Men were invited to submit an application for a series of open auditions for the chance to marry Marsh that September. MTV filmed the search and subsequent wedding. The reality series documenting Marsh's search to find a husband, entitled Totally Jodie Marsh: Who'll Take Her Up the Aisle?, premiered in July 2007. Marsh eventually chose Matt Peacock, an ex-boyfriend of fellow glamour model Jordan. The couple married on 1 September 2007. The second ceremony at her mother's home was aired on 2 September 2007. They decided to separate in December 2007. Marsh later admitted to Love It magazine in its 8 January 2008 issue that ".. the marriage was for TV. It was never for real" and "I'm not hiding the fact I did the TV show for money. Of course I did".

In 2008, Marsh showed viewers around her home on MTV's Cribs in its second UK series. Also in 2008, Marsh appeared on Channel 4's documentary It's Me or the Dog. She was given training tips at home to deal with her six dogs – two bulldogs (Paddy and Lyla) and four chihuahuas (Bean, Baby, Teddy, and Tommy).

On 29 September 2010, Marsh appeared in the one-off documentary Jodie Marsh Tattoo Apprentice which was screened on the channel DMAX.

On 24 January 2012, Marsh became the subject of her own DMAX documentary, Jodie Marsh: Bodybuilder, which chronicled Marsh's attempts to compete in natural physique competitions. The following day, Marsh appeared on Channel 5's Bullied: My Secret Past, where she spoke of the effect bullying had on her and how it has made her who she is today. She also met other victims of bullying. In June, Jodie Marsh: Brawn in the USA, featured Jodie competing in the International Natural Bodybuilding Federation Bodybuilding Championships in America.

In April 2013, Channel 5 broadcast the first of two shows titled Jodie Marsh: Bullied. The show features Marsh venturing to the United States to investigate how American schools tackle bullying.

In March 2015, TLC broadcast Jodie Marsh On… Women Who Pay For Sex And Drugs, about women who pay for the services of male escorts. In 2016, her series, Jodie Marsh Goes Hunting, premiered on 13 September on TLC.

Marsh has regularly appeared as a TV panelist since 2023 for GB News commentating on the daily headlines.

== Other work ==
=== Writing ===
In 2005, Marsh published her autobiography Keeping It Real. The hardback was released in 2005, followed by a paperback version in 2006. The hardback version reached the top 10 on the Amazon best-sellers list.

Marsh was previously Zoo Weekly magazine's "sexpert", advising men on sex-related issues. Her choice as an agony aunt angered some established professionals. She defended herself against these claims, stating, "I haven't exactly got a degree in psychology but I just love sex, don't I?"

=== Bodybuilding ===
At the end of January 2010, Marsh was featured on LA Muscle TV in an hour long show called 6 pack in 4 weeks. Jodie's work on the show resulted in a photo shoot for Muscle and Fitness magazine. In October 2011, Marsh entered the UK Natural Physique Association Bodybuilding Championships in Sheffield, where she was placed 5th overall. Marsh's new physique resulted in photo shoots and interviews with various magazines. OK! magazine featured an "at home" interview on 11 October 2011. Heat magazine followed on 12 October 2011. In June 2012, Marsh won gold in the International Natural Bodybuilding Federation Bodybuilding Championships in Los Angeles, California, which was featured on Jodie Marsh: Brawn in the USA.

Marsh owned a nutritional food supplements firm called JST Nutrition. In 2021, she was named by the Advertising Standards Authority (ASA), the UK's advertising watchdog, on a list of 122 Instagram influencers who have repeatedly violated ASA regulations.

=== Animal sanctuary ===
Marsh is the owner of Fripps Farm, an animal sanctuary in Great Dunmow, Essex. The sanctuary is home to more than 400 animals and according to Marsh costs £16,000 a month to manage. Marsh has stated that she uses her OnlyFans account to raise funds for her sanctuary.

== Personal life ==
In December 2006, Marsh announced her engagement to Brentwood DJ David Doyle (II), after dating for 11 days. Eschewing the traditional engagement ring, Marsh instead tattooed Doyle's full name on her hand and the couple appeared together in OK! magazine announcing their plan to marry in a fetish ceremony in a dungeon. The relationship ended between late December and mid-January 2007. Marsh claimed Doyle had been unfaithful.

She was married to Matt Peacock between September and December 2007 as a TV stunt. They decided to separate in December 2007.

In 2015, Marsh married personal trainer James Placido. She claimed that she was celibate for 5 years before she met Placido. The couple got divorced after eight months in April 2016.

Marsh has been a vegetarian since the age of five and became vegan in 2019.

== Sexual liaison story ==
In 2004, Marsh sold a story to the News of the World that she had had a sexual liaison as a teenager with Chelsea F.C. midfielder Frank Lampard who was in the year above her at Brentwood School. Lampard denied it and filed a complaint with the Press Complaints Commission. The complaint was not upheld.

== Filmography ==
=== Television ===
==== As herself ====
Year	Title	Notes
2003	Essex Wives	
2003	The Curse of Page 3	Documentary
2003, 2007	Loose Women	Guest; 2 episodes
2004	Love on a Saturday Night	2 episodes
2004	Celebrities Under Pressure	1 episode
2004	The Games	1 episode
2004	Back to Reality	2 episodes
2004	The Weakest Link	Celebrity edition
2004	The Luvvies	TV special
2004	Bo' Selecta!	1 episode
2004–2015	The Wright Stuff	Guest panellist; 4 episodes
2005	The Big Call	1 episode
2005	Dick & Dom in da Bungalow	Special guest; 1 episode
2005	Trust Me – I'm a Holiday Rep	1 episode
2006	The All Star Talent Show	Contestant on week 6
2006	Brainiac's Test Tube Baby	1 episode
2006	It's Me or the Dog	1 episode
2006, 2012	Celebrity Big Brother	
2007	Totally Jodie Marsh	
2007	Get a Life	Presenter; 3 episodes
2007–2018	This Morning	Guest; 6 episodes
2008	The Jeremy Kyle Show	1 episode
2008	Miss Naked Beauty	
2008	The Kevin Bishop Show	Cameo appearance; 1 episode
2008	CelebAir	1 episode
2009	Snog Marry Avoid?	Celebrity edition
2009	Celebrity Juice	1 episode
2010	Celebrity Come Dine with Me	
2011–2013	Big Brother's Bit on the Side	Guest panellist; 5 episodes
2012	My Secret Past	Documentary
2012	Jodie Marsh: Bodybuilder	Documentary
2012	Bodyshockers	1 episode
2013	Lemon La Vida Loca	5 episodes
2015	Jodie Marsh on...	

=== Film ===
Year	Title	Role
2006	Are You Ready for Love?	Mandi
2016	Gangsters Gamblers Geezers	Jodi
