= Oliver Skeete =

British equestrian and actor

Oliver Skeete (born 26 March 1956 in Speightstown, Barbados) is a British showjumper turned reality show contestant and actor.

== Biography ==
One of a family of 10 (four brothers and five sisters), Skeete travelled to England in September 1964 to join his parents who had settled in Acton, West London, and attended local schools to the age of fifteen. On leaving school Skeete qualified as a motor mechanic three years later. He worked for a time as a door supervisor at the Haven Stables on Spring Bridge Road in Ealing. His main sporting interest at this time was football and he played for a local youth team.

Skeete was first introduced to the world of horses by a chance meeting with a Spanish countess in a night-club. However, this was not a successful introduction as Skeete was left bruised and embarrassed after being thrown in Hyde Park. After marriage to another woman and two daughters to entertain, Skeete enrolled them at a local riding school. He found that his enthusiasm grew with theirs and decided to horse riding again.

Skeete sold the family car to purchase his first horse, and started show jumping in 1992, aged 36. He has competed at most levels except the very top. Skeete intended to represent Barbados at the Olympics in Sydney in 2000 as he failed to achieve the national British team Olympic standard and tried show jumping under the Barbadian flag, but he did not gain the required number of points for qualification.

== After show jumping ==
Skeete’s status of fame rose alongside his achievements as a show jumper. He gained widespread recognition within the media (not only for his talent), but also for bringing Black representation embodied by his dreadlocked hair amongst an overwhelmingly white middle-class world of British showjumping. He has maintained his minor celebrity status since leaving showjumping, appearing in TV shows such as ITV's Celebrity Wrestling and The Mint, Sky One's Brainiac: Science Abuse and Five's The All Star Talent Show and Diet Doctors. He also had a minor role in the Bond film Die Another Day, where he delivered Pierce Brosnan a key to the London Underground "offices" of MI6.

He also had worked on a British film called Clubbing to Death, with Nick Moran, Huey Morgan and Dave Courtney, that was due for release in 2007.

Skeete's autobiography is called Jumping the Odds: Memoirs of a Rastafarian Showjumper.

As of mid-July 2010 Skeete now works within the haulage industry as a lorry driver for MJD Group located in Kent.
