= Never A Hero =

UK musical group

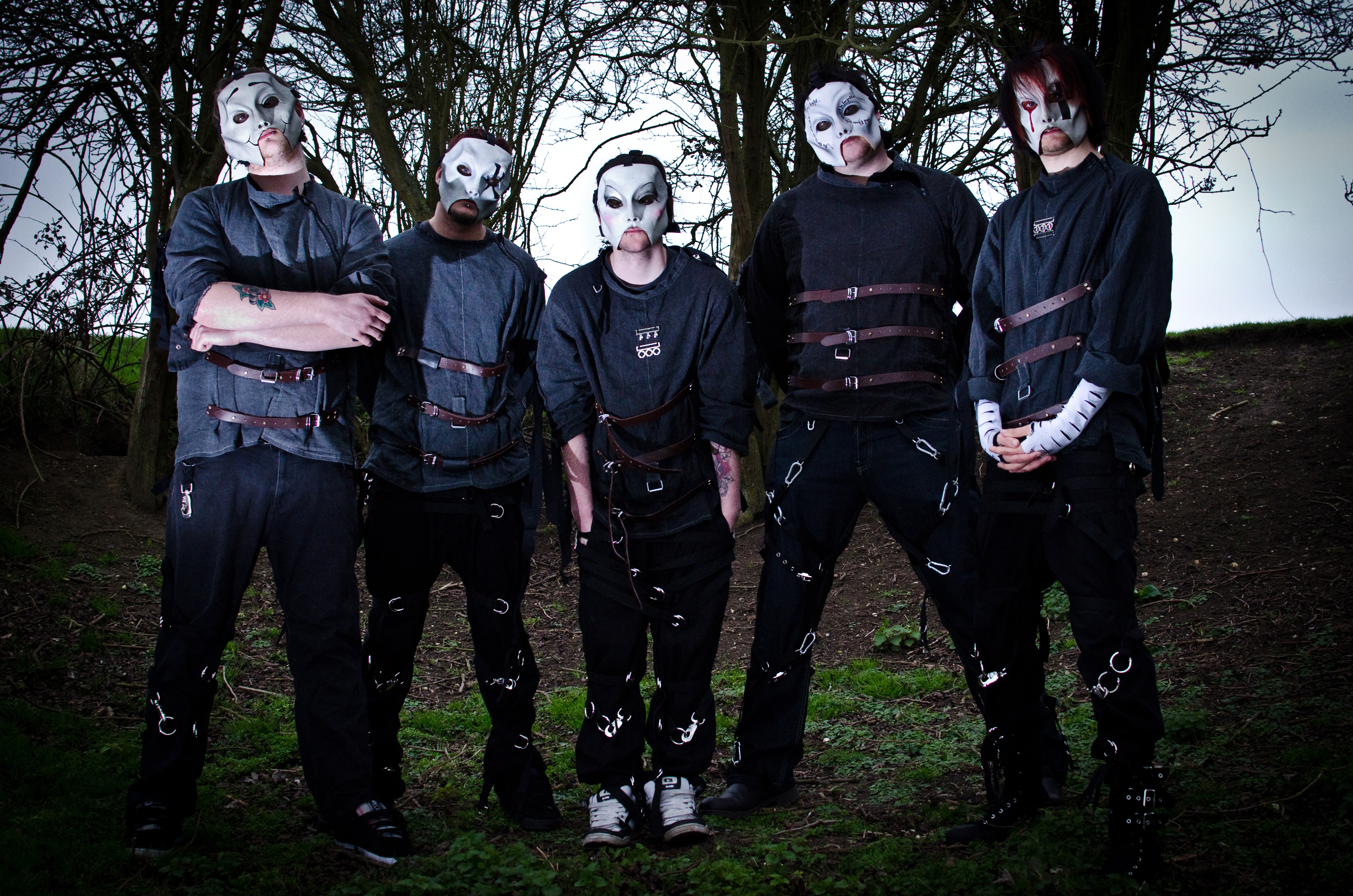

Background information
- Origin: Sudbury, Suffolk, England
- Genres: Nu metal, rap metal, rapcore, alternative metal
- Years active: 2009 – present
- Labels: Musik and Film/Cinderella; WTA; JukeBomb
- Members: Phrixus; KB; Mickey Thin; Kaji 2.0; Daisy Lai
- Past members: Mr White; Tom Povall (Toby C); Kaji
- Website: neverahero.net

Never A Hero was a five-piece nu metal band formed in Sudbury, Suffolk, England in 2009. They self-released their debut EP, Socially Awkward in September 2010, produced by John Mitchell at Outhouse Studios in Reading. It contains five songs including "From Heroes To Angels", which received air time on Kerrang! and Scuzz TV and also "Trippin on Speed". In November 2012, they released their debut album, Bleed Between The Lies, through Cinderella Records / Musik and Film which the band signed to in early 2012. The album features 14 tracks, five of which are re-released versions of older demos featured on the band's Myspace.

== History ==
=== 2010 ===
- Recorded 'Socially Awkward' EP with John Mitchell at Outhouse Studios
- Filmed video for 'From Heroes To Angels' which featured on Kerrang and Scuzz TV
- Performed at prestigious venues such as the Camden Underworld and the O2 Academy Islington

=== 2011 ===
- Went through the first round of the Red Bull Bedroom Jam to play live on the internet. It was hosted by Katie Parsons and Funeral for a Friend
- Filmed video for 'Trippin on Speed'on Southwold beach
- Departure of Tom Povall (Toby C) from the band in July

=== 2012 ===
- Toured the UK in January and played alongside Jon Oliva's Pain at The Garage, London
- Performed at various festivals throughout the UK including Willowfest and The Camden Crawl with Japanese metalcore band Crossfaith and Fearless Vampire Killers
- Supported legendary bands, Wrathchild and Wolfsbane on their UK tour at the O2 Academy Oxford
- Filmed video for Burning Skies which featured Coronation Street star Les Battersby, (Bruce Jones)
- Won Band Crusade competition, which was a national promotion campaign to try to get a UK rock act into the Christmas charts.

=== 2013 ===
- Played at venues and festivals across the UK.
- Filmed videos for 'Hollow' and 'Untouchable' which are set to be released early 2014

== Members ==
=== Current ===
- Phrixus – Vocals
- Kaji 2.0 – (2012–present)
- Mickey Thin – Rhythm Guitar, Vocals (2009–present)
- KB – Bass Guitar, Vocals (2009–present)
- Olli Hamlet – Drums, Electronics (2009–present)

=== Former ===
- Tom Povall (Toby C) – Lead Guitar, Vocals (2009–2011)
- Mr White – DJ, Vocals (2009–2010)

== Discography ==
- Socially Awkward EP (2010)
  - All songs written by Never a Hero and Tom Povall

No.	Title	Length
1.	"Too Little, Too Late"	3:27
2.	"From Heroes to Angels"	3:02
3.	"Trippin' on Speed"	4:06
4.	"Say (No More)"	3:38
5.	"Diaries from Rehab"	3:42

- Bleed Between the Lies (2012)
