= Tony Elliott (publisher) =

British magazine publisher (1947–2020)

Tony Elliott CBE
- Born: Anthony Michael Manton Elliott; 7 January 1947; Reading, Berkshire, England
- Died: 17 July 2020 (aged 73); London, England
- Education: Keele University
- Occupation: Publisher
- Known for: Founder of Time Out Group
- Spouses: Janet Street-Porter (m. 1975; div. 1977) Jane Coke (m. 1989)
- Children: 3

Anthony Michael Manton Elliott (7 January 1947 – 16 July 2020) was an English publisher, and the founder and owner of Time Out Group, based in London. He was educated at Stowe School and Keele University.

Elliott was appointed Commander of the Order of the British Empire (CBE) in the 2017 Birthday Honours for services to publishing.

A keen cinema-goer, Elliott served, as a Governor of the British Film Institute and as a Founding Board Member and Ambassador of Film London.

Elliott died in London from lung cancer on 16 July 2020, at the age of 73.

Formerly married to Janet Street-Porter, he later married Jane Coke, with whom he had three sons.
