= The All Star Talent Show =

- Starring: Andi Peters; Myleene Klass; Julian Clary
- Country of origin: United Kingdom
- Original language: English
- No. of series: 1
- No. of episodes: 6

Production
- Running time: 90 mins

Original release
- Network: Five
- Release: 8 September – 13 October 2006

The All Star Talent Show is a 2006 UK television programme that was broadcast on Five. It was presented by Andi Peters and Myleene Klass, with Julian Clary making up the judging panel alongside two guest judges. Each show had six celebrities performing, with the winner of each episode going into the final at the end of the series. In addition, the runner up with the most votes at the end of the series also performed again in the final. Backing vocals on the show were directed and sung by Tracy Graham and Tara McDonald.

== Episodes ==
=== Week 1 (8 September) ===
Celebrity	Talent	Final placing
Malandra Burrows	Fire eating	5th
Juliette Foster	Singing	2nd
Bernie Nolan	Rock drumming	4th
Stedman Pearson	Contemporary ballet	3rd
Carol Thatcher	Tap dancing	1st
Kevin Woodford	Singing show tunes	6th

The two guest judges on this episode were Jo Brand and Kerry Katona. The winner of this heat was Carol Thatcher. Juliette Foster was the highest scoring runner up in the whole series and so made it into the final as well.

=== Week 2 (15 September) ===
Celebrity	Talent	Final placing
Ron Atkinson	Singing	3rd
Peter Duncan	Performing a high wire routine	2nd
Sally James	Tap dancing	4th
Jodie Marsh	Latin dancing	1st
Andy Scott-Lee	Performing magic tricks	5th
Oliver Skeete	Singing	6th

The two guest judges on this episode were Bobby Davro and Sally Lindsay. The winner of this heat was Jodie Marsh.

=== Week 3 (22 September) ===
Celebrity	Talent	Final placing
Victoria Bush	Singing	3rd
Jilly Goolden	Dancing flamenco	6th
Carly Hillman	Performing a majorette routine	2nd
Ben Ofoedu	Performing magic tricks	5th
Lembit Öpik	Playing the harmonica	4th
Roy Walker	Operatic singing	1st

The two guest judges on this episode were Lucy Benjamin and Christopher Biggins. The winner of this heat was Roy Walker.

=== Week 4 (29 September) ===
Celebrity	Talent	Final placing
Jeremy Beadle	Performing magic tricks	6th
Rhona Cameron	Jazz singing	2nd
The Cheeky Girls	Ballet dancing	5th
Tamara Czartoryska	Flamenco dancing	4th
Kevin Kennedy	Singing	3rd
Henry Olonga	Operatic singing	1st

The two guest judges on this episode were Bonnie Langford and Freddie Starr. The winner of this heat was Henry Olonga.

=== Week 5 (6 October) ===
Celebrity	Talent	Final placing
John Altman	Playing the drums	6th
Toby Anstis	Jazz dancing	1st
Kéllé Bryan	Performing capoeira	3rd
Stephen Gately	Performing magic tricks	2nd
Oona King	Playing classical piano	5th
Pooja Shah	Classical Indian dancing	4th

The two guest judges on this episode were Peter André and Vanessa Feltz. The winner of this heat was Toby Anstis.

=== Week 6: Final (13 October) ===
Celebrity	Talent	Final placing
Toby Anstis	Jazz dancing	3rd
Juliette Foster	Singing	6th
Jodie Marsh	Latin dancing	4th
Henry Olonga	Operatic singing	1st
Carol Thatcher	Tap dancing	5th
Roy Walker	Operatic singing	2nd

The two guest judges on this episode were Jo Brand and David Gest.

The winner of the series was Henry Olonga.
