= Bruce Jones (actor) =

English actor

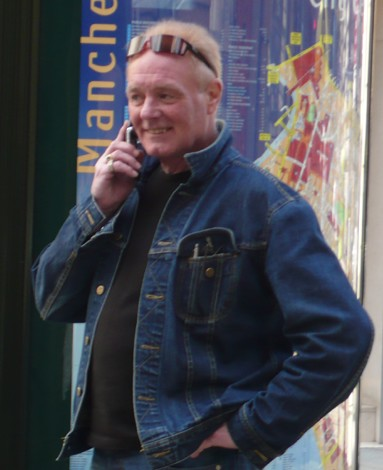
- Jones in 2007
- Born: Ian Royston Jones; 24 January 1953 (age 73); Collyhurst, Manchester, England
- Occupation: Actor
- Years active: 1992–present
- Spouses: Sue Bailey (m. 1971; div. 1982) Sandra Jones (m. 1984)
- Children: 4

Ian Royston Jones (born 24 January 1953), better known as Bruce Jones, is an English actor and professional wrestler. He is best known for his role as taxi driver Les Battersby in Coronation Street from 1997 to 2007.

== Early life ==
Jones was born in Collyhurst, Manchester. As a child, he spent two years on a hospital isolation ward with rheumatic fever. When he was 12, his parents separated and he was expelled from school, after which he was raised in North Wales by his grandmother. He left school at 16 and worked as a pipe fitter; he was also a fireman.

== Career ==
=== Early career ===
Jones had a teacher who encouraged him to become an actor. He and a friend formed a comedy duo, known as Clark and Jones, and he began using his father's name, Bruce Jones, as his stage name.

After years acting in addition to day jobs, Jones' first big break came in 1993, when he was cast in the lead role of Bob Williams in Ken Loach's feature film Raining Stones. The film won the Evening Standard British Film Awards for Best Film and Best Screenplay.

In 1995, Jones had a role as a prostitute's client in Band of Gold. In 1996 he appeared in Jimmy McGovern's Hillsborough. In 1997, Jones had a small part in the film The Full Monty, and also appeared with Bob Hoskins in the Shane Meadows film Twenty Four Seven.

=== Coronation Street years ===
From July 1997 to May 2007, Jones was a regular cast member of the ITV soap opera Coronation Street as the outspoken rogue Les Battersby.

Since then, Jones has had numerous credits for film and television productions, including Heartbeat, A Touch of Frost, the pilot episode of Harry Hill's TV Burp, and Roughnecks. He appeared as Dean Martin in Celebrity Stars in Their Eyes, Mr. Bumble in Oliver for Children in Need, and the Robber in Granada's televised Christmas pantomime Cinderella. He also made several television appearances in game shows and chat shows.

In March 2007, he was suspended from Coronation Street after allegedly getting drunk with an undercover reporter, making inappropriate comments and revealing future storylines. It was confirmed in May that year that Jones would not be returning to the show; he would be suspended until his contract ended in September. Jones noted that he was one of the victims of the since-discredited reporter Mazher Mahmood, and has said that his departure from the programme was voluntary.

=== After Coronation Street ===
Since leaving Coronation Street, Jones has performed stand-up comedy routines in Benidorm. On 23 March 2008, he featured in Celebrity Wife Swap with Sinitta. He played Mick the Manager in the film Souled Out, and also appeared on the TV programme The Dark Side of Fame with Piers Morgan.

With four other celebrities, Jones took part in the BBC One show Famous, Rich and Homeless, broadcast in June 2009. The five temporarily lived on the streets of London. Jones was clearly the most affected by the experience, regularly seen breaking into tears and considering pulling out of the programme. He ranted to the camera advocating the reinstatement of hanging in the UK, in order to free up funds to assist the homeless and pensioners. He referenced his horrific discovery of one of the Yorkshire Ripper's victims, describing himself as a victim.

In November 2009, Jones appeared in Celebrity Come Dine with Me. The competition also featured presenter Yvette Fielding and Atomic Kitten member Natasha Hamilton; it was won by former Catchphrase host Roy Walker. The same year, he worked with Manchester-based production company Gritish Films, featuring in the short film Down Our Way, alongside Inspiral Carpets vocalist Clint Boon and actor Gary Graham Smith.

During the 2009–10 Christmas season, Jones appeared as King Rat in the pantomime Dick Whittington at the Contemporary Urban Centre in Liverpool. In 2011, he performed as Captain Hook and Mr. Darling in Peter Pan at the Blackfriars Arts Centre in Boston.

In April 2012, Jones appeared in a music video for the British rock band Never A Hero, which was featured on Kerrang! TV.

In 2013, while also working as a mechanic, Jones appeared in a one-man play about tackling and recovering from depression, TALK!! Tackling the Taboo, which he commissioned from author and playwright Huw Roberts.

On 22 August 2013, Jones entered the Celebrity Big Brother house with his screen Coronation Street ex-wife, Vicky Entwistle; on 6 September 2013, he was the fourth housemate to be evicted, on the same day as Dustin Diamond.

=== Return to feature films ===
In April 2014, production started on a Welsh feature film, Cream, in which Jones played the lead character, Ron Harris. Filming took place in and around Llandudno. That year, he appeared in British gangster thriller Looters, Tooters and Sawn-Off Shooters, in which he played Roy.

In 2020, Jones was cast in the comedy short film Shiney, directed by Paul Holbrook, which was funded by the BFI Network South West. The short film was featured at various film festivals, including the International Film Festival of Wales, who awarded Jones Best Supporting Actor in 2021.

Novelist and screenwriter Simon W. Golding wrote the screenplay of The Coat, a thriller feature film, for Jones. It will be directed and edited by Jason Figgis.

=== Professional wrestling ===
At the age of 71, Jones made his debut in professional wrestling, appearing in character as Les Battersby at a Sovereign Pro Wrestling event in Manchester on 18 February 2024. Jones was initially booked to make a cameo to promote an upcoming match; after the promotion received more publicity, however, the promotion asked if he would be willing to be "knocked about in the ring", to which he agreed. At the promotion's next event in May 2024, Jones – as part of the "Les Battersby World Order" – took part in a "Coronation Street Fight" before being confronted by Steven Arnold, in character as Ashley Peacock and leading his own faction, the "Butcher Club". (Note: The Les Battersby World Order and Butcher Club are parodies of the New World Order and Bullet Club, respectively.)

== Publications ==
He published his autobiography, Bruce Jones: The Official Autobiography, in November 2011.

== Charity work ==
Jones has appeared at many Variety Club fundraising events and been an ambassador for the charity. On 16 February 2011, he made an appearance for the Sir Norman Wisdom tribute at De Montfort Hall in Leicester, raising money for the Roy Castle Fund; he spoke of Wisdom's time on Coronation Street.

== Awards ==
- European Actors Award, Raining Stones
- co-winner, Screen Actors Guild Award, outstanding performance by a cast in a major motion picture, The Full Monty
- Silver Heart, Variety Club of Great Britain, 2004

== Personal life ==
Jones' first marriage was to Sue Bailey. They had two sons, and divorced in 1982.

Jones is a fan of the English rock band Status Quo just like his character Les Battersby in Coronation Street.

On the morning of 9 October 1977, Jones discovered the mutilated body of 20-year-old Jean Jordan on an allotment in Chorlton, Manchester, a victim of the "Yorkshire Ripper", Peter Sutcliffe. He was treated as a suspect, and attracted recurring coverage in the tabloids about his supposed "secret". He has attributed the end of his first marriage to the suspicion and his resulting depression. He spoke about the discovery and how it affected him in the Netflix series The Ripper (episode: "Between Now and Dawn").

In 1984, Jones married Sandra; the couple had two children.

Jones has had problems with alcoholism. In 1998, he pleaded guilty to drink driving after being tested by police and found to be more than twice the legal limit, and was banned from driving for three years. In 2000, he spent a period in the celebrity rehab clinic the Priory. After leaving Coronation Street, he found it hard to get work, and drank heavily. In August 2009, while drunk, he grabbed and repeatedly jerked the steering wheel of his car whilst his wife was driving it on the A55 in North Wales. He subsequently pleaded guilty to dangerous driving and drink driving. His wife told the court that he had physically and emotionally abused her for years. He was given a suspended sentence; he and his wife separated and he became bankrupt and homeless.

In June 2015, Jones appeared in a documentary called Celebs on Benefits: Fame To Claim, about celebrities who have hit hard times. In 2019, he hit out against the rollout of Universal Credit, saying that the wait for the first payment was causing severe hardship, and that he had recently helped a family with money for food.

== Credits ==
Year	Title	Role	Notes
1993	Raining Stones	Bob	
1994	Heartbeat	Fred Parkin	
1995	Band of Gold	punter	
1995–1996	Roughnecks	Terry	
1996	Bob's Weekend	Bob	
1996	Hillsborough	Video Technician	
1997	A Touch of Frost	Tommy Dunstan	
1997	Eight Hours from Paris	Male inspector	
1997	The Full Monty	Reg	
1997	Twenty Four Seven	Tim's Dad	
1997–2007	Coronation Street	Les Battersby	1,022 episodes
1999	10x10	Priest	
2008	Snappers	Bruce	
2010	Soulboy	Mike the Manager	
2014	Looters, Tooters and Sawn-Off Shooters	Roy	
2014	Cream	Major Ron Harris	
2017	Distorted	Detective Jones	
2017	Duty of Care	Major Ron Harris	
2017	The Offer	Michael Bishop	
2018	Finders Keepers	Roy Smiley	
2019	The Witching Hour	Marvin La'Fantome	
2020	Breach of the Peace	Vince	
2020	Shiney	Bill the Newsagent	
2023	The Full Monty	Vince	2 episodes
2024	The Athena Syndrome	Sasha Nikitovich	
