= Kate Garraway's Life Stories =

British television chat show

- Also known as: Piers Morgan's Life Stories
- Genre: Talk show
- Created by: Piers Morgan
- Directed by: Paul Kirrage; Anna Edwinson; Jamie Batten
- Presented by: Piers Morgan; Kate Garraway
- Country of origin: United Kingdom
- Original language: English
- No. of series: 22
- No. of episodes: 110

Production
- Producers: Jeremy Phillips; Yvonne Alexander
- Production locations: The London Studios (2010–17); Teddington Studios (2010–11); Television Centre (2009, 2013, 2019–)
- Running time: 60–90 minutes (including adverts)
- Production company: Multistory Media

Original release
- Network: ITV
- Release: 22 February 2009 – present

Related
- The Dark Side of Fame with Piers Morgan; John Bishop: In Conversation With...

Kate Garraway's Life Stories (formerly known as Piers Morgan's Life Stories until 2021 and also known as just Life Stories) is a British television chat show on ITV, presented by Kate Garraway and was formerly presented by Piers Morgan. Recorded in front of a studio audience, each episode is devoted to one celebrity guest. Episodes are filmed at Television Centre (although they were previously made at Teddington Studios and The London Studios) between one and two weeks before being broadcast on television. On 21 October 2021, it was confirmed that Morgan was leaving the show and would be replaced by Kate Garraway, his final guest.

== Episode guide ==
=== Transmissions ===
Series	Episodes	Originally released	
Series	Episodes	First released	Last released
1	6	22 February 2009	5 April 2009
2	6	10 October 2009	14 November 2009
3	7	14 February 2010	10 April 2010
4	7	9 October 2010	27 November 2010
5	6	16 April 2011	21 May 2011
6	5	29 October 2011	24 December 2011
7	7	13 April 2012	25 May 2012
8	6	14 September 2012	26 October 2012
9	6	22 February 2013	5 April 2013
10	6	20 September 2013	1 November 2013
11	7	3 January 2014	14 February 2014
12	3	5 September 2014	19 September 2014
13	6	4 September 2015	11 December 2015
14	4	3 February 2017	24 February 2017
15	4	23 October 2017	10 March 2018
16	5	25 May 2019	22 June 2019
17	3	5 September 2020	25 October 2020
18	5	11 February 2021	18 March 2021
19	4	30 May 2021	5 December 2021
20	3	3 February 2022	17 February 2022
21	3	2 August 2023	16 August 2023
22	TBA	1 April 2025	TBA

=== Series 1 ===
No. overall	No. in series	Title	Original release date
1	1	"Sharon Osbourne"	22 February 2009
2	2	"Richard Branson"	1 March 2009
3	3	"Katie Price"	8 March 2009
4	4	"Sheila Hancock"	15 March 2009
5	5	"Ulrika Jonsson"	29 March 2009
6	6	"Richard Madeley"	5 April 2009

=== Series 2 ===
No. overall	No. in series	Title	Original release date
7	1	"Cilla Black"	10 October 2009
8	2	"Boris Becker"	17 October 2009
9	3	"Katherine Jenkins"	24 October 2009
10	4	"Dannii Minogue"	31 October 2009
11	5	"Ronnie Corbett"	7 November 2009
12	6	"Vinnie Jones"	14 November 2009

=== Series 3 ===
No. overall	No. in series	Title	Original release date
13	1	"Gordon Brown"	14 February 2010
14	2	"Simon Cowell"	6 March 2010
15	3	"Kym Marsh"	13 March 2010
16	4	"Bruce Forsyth"	20 March 2010
17	5	"Joan Collins"	27 March 2010
18	6	"Geri Halliwell"	3 April 2010
19	7	"Michael Winner"	10 April 2010

=== Series 4 ===
No. overall	No. in series	Title	Original release date
20	1	"Barbara Windsor"	9 October 2010
21	2	"Russell Watson"	16 October 2010
22	3	"Cheryl Cole"	23 October 2010
23	4	"Rod Stewart"	30 October 2010
24	5	"Susan Boyle"	6 November 2010
25	6	"Kelly Osbourne"	20 November 2010
26	7	"Elton John"	27 November 2010

=== Series 5 ===
No. overall	No. in series	Title	Original release date
27	1	"Russell Brand"	16 April 2011
28	2	"Patsy Palmer"	23 April 2011
29	3	"Ann Widdecombe"	30 April 2011
30	4	"David Hasselhoff"	7 May 2011
31	5	"John Prescott"	14 May 2011
32	6	"Des O'Connor"	21 May 2011

=== Series 6 ===
No. overall	No. in series	Title	Original release date
33	1	"James Corden"	29 October 2011
34	2	"Rolf Harris"	5 November 2011
35	3	"Paul Gascoigne"	12 November 2011
36	4	"Peter Andre"	10 December 2011
37	5	"Donny Osmond"	24 December 2011

=== Series 7 ===
No. overall	No. in series	Title	Original release date
38	1	"William Roache"	13 April 2012
39	2	"Frank Bruno"	20 April 2012
40	3	"Carol Vorderman"	27 April 2012
41	4	"Jason Donovan"	4 May 2012
42	5	"Dennis Waterman"	11 May 2012
43	6	"Lulu"	18 May 2012
44	7	"Jimmy Tarbuck"	25 May 2012

=== Series 8 ===
No. overall	No. in series	Title	Original release date
45	1	"Roger Moore"	14 September 2012
46	2	"Kelly Holmes"	21 September 2012
47	3	"Denise Welch"	28 September 2012
48	4	"Ronan Keating"	5 October 2012
49	5	"Felicity Kendal"	19 October 2012
50	6	"Burt Reynolds"	26 October 2012

=== Series 9 ===
No. overall	No. in series	Title	Original release date
51	1	"Esther Rantzen"	22 February 2013
52	2	"Lorraine Kelly"	1 March 2013
53	3	"Jayne Torvill; Christopher Dean"	8 March 2013
54	4	"Bruno Tonioli"	15 March 2013
55	5	"Britt Ekland"	29 March 2013
56	6	"Karren Brady"	5 April 2013

=== Series 10 ===
No. overall	No. in series	Title	Original release date
57	1	"Julie Goodyear"	20 September 2013
58	2	"Gloria Hunniford"	27 September 2013
59	3	"Brian Blessed"	4 October 2013
60	4	"Julian Clary"	18 October 2013
61	5	"Pete Waterman"	25 October 2013
62	6	"Michael Flatley"	1 November 2013

=== Series 11 ===
No. overall	No. in series	Title	Original release date
63	1	"June Brown"	3 January 2014
64	2	"Mary Berry"	10 January 2014
65	3	"Neil Morrissey"	17 January 2014
66	4	"Beverley Callard"	24 January 2014
67	5	"Martin Kemp"	31 January 2014
68	6	"Tony Blackburn"	7 February 2014
69	7	"Ian Botham"	14 February 2014

=== Series 12 ===
No. overall	No. in series	Title	Original release date
70	1	"Alesha Dixon"	5 September 2014
71	2	"Andrew Flintoff"	12 September 2014
72	3	"Bear Grylls"	19 September 2014

=== Series 13 ===
No. overall	No. in series	Title	Original release date
73	1	"Lionel Richie"	4 September 2015
74	2	"Mo Farah"	11 September 2015
75	3	"John Lydon"	25 September 2015
76	4	"Warwick Davis"	16 October 2015
77	5	"Raquel Welch"	6 November 2015
78	6	"Timothy West"	11 December 2015

=== Series 14 ===
No. overall	No. in series	Title	Original release date
79	1	"Barry Gibb"	3 February 2017
80	2	"Nigel Havers"	10 February 2017
81	3	"Boy George"	17 February 2017
82	4	"Nigel Farage"	24 February 2017

=== Series 15 ===
No. overall	No. in series	Title	Original release date
83	1	"Kim Cattrall"	23 October 2017
84	2	"Caitlyn Jenner"	4 January 2018
85	3	"Pamela Anderson"	3 March 2018
86	4	"Jim Davidson"	10 March 2018

=== Series 16 ===
No. overall	No. in series	Title	Original release date
87	1	"Mel B"	25 May 2019
88	2	"Michael Parkinson"	1 June 2019
89	3	"Michael Barrymore"	8 June 2019
90	4	"Harry Redknapp"	15 June 2019
91	5	"Alan Sugar"	22 June 2019

=== Series 17 ===
No. overall	No. in series	Title	Original release date
92	1	"Vinnie Jones"	5 September 2020
93	2	"Captain Tom Moore"	13 September 2020
94	3	"Cliff Richard"	25 October 2020

=== Series 18 ===
No. overall	No. in series	Title	Original release date
95	1	"Gemma Collins"	11 February 2021
96	2	"Chris Eubank"	18 February 2021
97	3	"Trisha Goddard"	25 February 2021
98	4	"Rupert Everett"	4 March 2021
99	5	"Coleen Nolan"	18 March 2021

=== Series 19 ===
- Piers Morgan’s final series as host.

No. overall	No. in series	Title	Original release date
100	1	"Piers Morgan's 100 Life Stories"	30 May 2021
101	2	"Keir Starmer"	1 June 2021
102	3	"Joan Collins"	20 June 2021
103	4	"Kate Garraway"	5 December 2021

=== Series 20 ===
- Kate Garraway’s first series as host.

No. overall	No. in series	Title	Original release date
104	1	"John Barnes"	3 February 2022
105	2	"Nadiya Hussain"	10 February 2022
106	3	"Charlotte Church"	17 February 2022

=== Series 21 ===
No. overall	No. in series	Title	Original release date
107	1	"Anton Du Beke"	2 August 2023
108	2	"Ruby Wax"	9 August 2023
109	3	"Omid Djalili"	16 August 2023

=== Series 22 ===
No. overall	No. in series	Title	Original release date
110	1	"Jeremy Kyle"	1 April 2025

=== Special episodes ===
Three special episodes with Sir Cliff Richard, Lord Lloyd-Webber and Lord Sugar have aired.
