= Call Me a Cabbie =

Reality television show

Call Me a Cabbie is a reality show where three celebrities have to learn all the skills needed to be a black cab driver in two months.

== Series one ==
The first series originally aired from July to September 2006. The celebrities featured were Jeff Brazier, Carol Thatcher and Janet Street-Porter. Each week the group would learn new skills such as completing manoeuvres in their cabs, map reading and driving difficult passengers to destinations around London. At the end of the series the celebrities had to face both a written and a practical test to see if they had the required skills to become a cabbie.

This seven part series was originally produced for ITV London and was repeated on Sky3.

== Series two ==
The second series first aired on ITV London on 22 July 2007. This time the celebrities featured were Nick Ferrari, Lady Isabella Hervey and Chantelle Preston.

The series was later screened (January 2008) on Life One.
