= Love on a Saturday Night =

2004 British game show

- Genre: Dating game show
- Presented by: Davina McCall
- Starring: Jonathan Wilkes (on location)
- Theme music composer: Ben Foster
- Country of origin: United Kingdom
- Original language: English
- No. of series: 2
- No. of episodes: 10

Production
- Running time: 60 minutes (including commercials)
- Production company: LWT

Original release
- Network: ITV
- Release: 7 February – 22 May 2004

Love on a Saturday Night is a London Weekend Television produced game show that aired on ITV between 7 February and 22 May 2004. It was a replacement show for Blind Date, and lasted only two series before being axed.

The first episode, which was broadcast live, was watched by 5.1 million viewers. An episode in the second series was watched by 3.8 million viewers.

== Format ==
=== The main game ===
Similarly to Blind Date, the main round would be based in the middle of the studio where either three men or three women (it would alternate each week) would be wearing different coloured masks and known as Mr Red/Miss Ruby, Mr Blue/Miss Sapphire, Mr Green/Miss Emerald, then the person asking the questions would be standing to one side of them with Davina.

=== Celebrity dating ===
Other features included celebrity dates. This was a chance for a member of the audience to be surprised and go on a date with a celebrity. Some of the celebrities included were: Rebecca Loos, Jodie Marsh, Sam Nixon, Mark Owen, Shobna Gulati, Sally Lindsay, Richard Blackwood, Tony Blackburn, Ronan Keating, Terri Dwyer, Nicki Chapman and the members of British five-piece boy band V.

== Trivia ==
Jonathan Wilkes' outside broadcasts were only featured in Series 1 as a member of the public uttered a profanity live on air when surprised by Wilkes and his camera crew, before the 9 o'clock watershed. Thereafter, the programme was also taped as opposed to being broadcast live.

All episodes originated from The London Studios.

== Transmissions ==
Series	Episodes	Originally released	
Series	Episodes	First released	Last released
1	5	7 February 2004	6 March 2004
2	5	24 April 2004	22 May 2004
