= Janet Street-Porter =

British media personality, journalist and broadcaster (born 1946)

Janet Street-Porter CBE
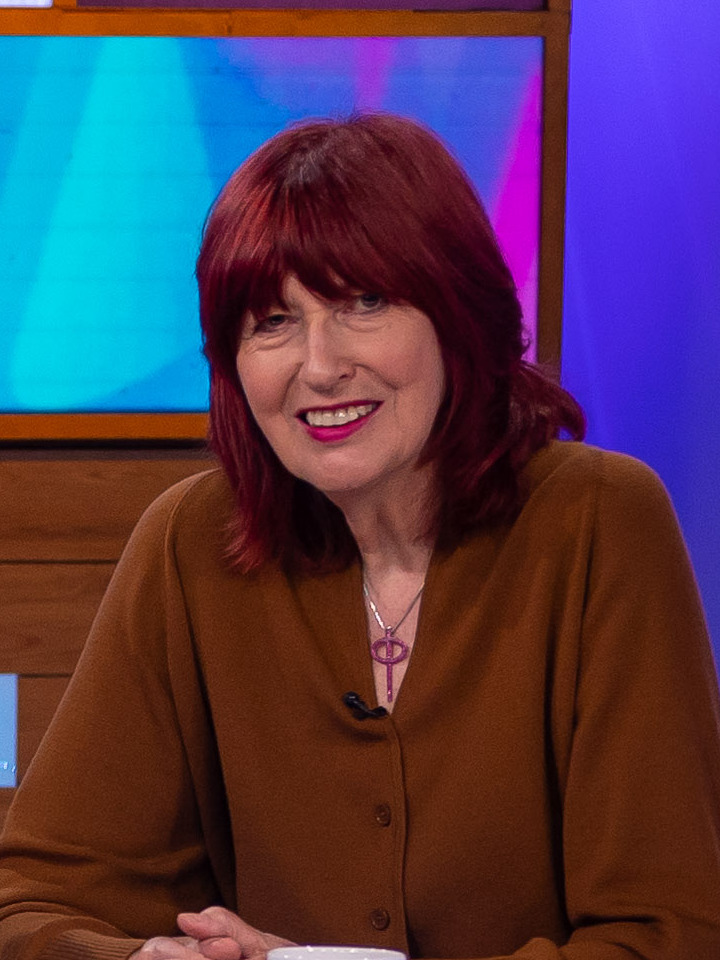
- Street-Porter on Loose Women in 2024
- Born: Janet Vera Bull; 27 December 1946 (age 79); Brentford, Middlesex, England
- Education: Lady Margaret School; Architectural Association School of Architecture
- Occupations: Broadcaster; journalist; writer; producer; media personality
- Years active: 1967–present
- Spouses: Tim Street-Porter (m. 1967; div. 1975) Tony Elliott (m. 1975; div. 1977) Frank Cvitanovich (m. 1979; div. 1981) David Sorkin (m. 1997; div. 1999) Peter Spanton (m. 2026)
- Janet Street-Porter's voice from the BBC programme Desert Island Discs, 23 November 2008
- Website: Official website

Janet Vera Street-Porter (née Bull; born 27 December 1946) is an English broadcaster, journalist, writer and media personality. She began her career in 1969 as a fashion writer and columnist at the Daily Mail and was appointed fashion editor of the Evening Standard in 1971. In 1973, she co-presented a mid-morning radio show with Paul Callan on LBC.

Street-Porter began working on television at London Weekend Television in 1975, first as a presenter of a series of mainly youth-oriented programmes. She was the editor and producer of the Network 7 series on Channel 4 in 1987, and served as a BBC Television executive from 1987 until 1994. She was an editor of The Independent on Sunday from 1999 until 2002, but relinquished the job to become editor-at-large.

Since 2011, Street-Porter has been a regular panellist on the ITV talk show Loose Women. Her other television appearances include Question Time (1998–2015), Have I Got News for You (1996–2025), I'm a Celebrity... Get Me Out of Here! (2004), Deadline (2007), Celebrity MasterChef (2013) and A Taste of Britain (2014). Street-Porter was appointed a Commander of the Order of the British Empire (CBE) in the 2016 Birthday Honours for services to journalism and broadcasting.

== Early life ==
Street-Porter was born in Brentford, Middlesex (now in the London Borough of Hounslow). She is the daughter of Stanley W. G. Bull, an electrical engineer who had served as a sergeant in the Royal Corps of Signals in the Second World War, and Cherry Cuff Ardern (née Jones), who was Welsh and worked as a school dinner lady and in the civil service as a clerical assistant in a tax office. Her mother was still married to her first husband, George Ardern, at the time, and was not to marry Stanley Bull until 1954, hence Street-Porter's name being recorded as Ardern in the birth records. She was later to take her father's surname.

Street-Porter grew up in Fulham, west London, and Perivale, Middlesex; the family moved there when she was 14. They stayed in her mother's home town of Llanfairfechan in North Wales for their holidays. Street-Porter attended Peterborough Primary and Junior Schools in Fulham and Lady Margaret Grammar School for Girls (now Lady Margaret School) in Parsons Green from 1958 to 1964, where she passed eight O-levels and three A-levels in English, History and Art. She also took an A-level in pure mathematics, but did not pass the exam. Whilst studying for her A-levels, she had an illegal abortion. She then spent two years at the Architectural Association School of Architecture, where she met her first husband, photographer Tim Street-Porter.

== Career ==
Street-Porter began her career as a fashion writer and columnist on the Daily Mail, and was appointed as the newspaper's deputy fashion editor in 1969 by Shirley Conran. She became fashion editor of the Evening Standard in 1971. When the London Broadcasting Company (LBC) local radio station began to broadcast in 1973, Street-Porter co-presented a mid-morning show with Fleet Street columnist Paul Callan. The intention was sharply to contrast the urbane Callan and the urban Street-Porter. Their respective accents became known to the station's studio engineers as "cut-glass" and "cut-froat". Friction between the ill-matched pair involved constant one-upmanship.

In early 1975, Street-Porter was launch editor of Sell Out, an offshoot of the London listings magazine Time Out, with its publisher and her second husband, Tony Elliott. The magazine was not a success.

=== Television ===
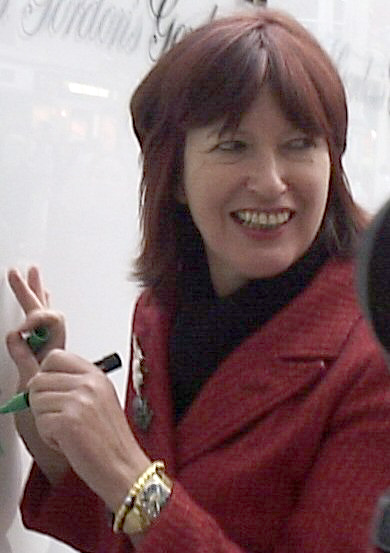
Street-Porter unveiling the Gordon's Gin "Judge for Yourself" tour at London Victoria station in November 2005

Street-Porter began to work in television at London Weekend Television (LWT) in 1975, first as a reporter on a series of mainly youth-oriented programmes, including The London Weekend Show (1975–79), then went on to present the late-night chat show Saturday Night People (1978–80) with Clive James and Russell Harty. She later produced Twentieth Century Box (1980–82), presented by Danny Baker.

Street-Porter was editor of the Network 7 series on Channel 4 from 1987, which was awarded a BAFTA for its graphics the following year. Also in 1987, BBC2 controller Alan Yentob appointed her to become head of youth and entertainment features, making her responsible for the twice-weekly DEF II. She commissioned Rapido and Red Dwarf, and cancelled the long-running music series The Old Grey Whistle Test.

In 1992, Street-Porter provided the story for The Vampyr: A Soap Opera, the BBC's adaptation of Heinrich August Marschner's opera Der Vampyr, which featured a new libretto by Charles Hart. Street-Porter's approach did not endear her to critics, who objected to her diction and questioned her suitability as an influence on Britain's youth. In her final year at the BBC, she became head of independent commissioning. She left the BBC for Mirror Group Newspapers in 1994 to become joint-managing director, with Kelvin MacKenzie, of the ill-fated L!VE TV channel. She left in October 1995, four months after L!ve had begun broadcasting. In 1996, Street-Porter established her own production company. Since that year, Street-Porter has appeared several times on the BBC panel show Have I Got News for You and topical debate series Question Time.

In 2000, Street-Porter was nominated for the Mae West Award for the Most Outspoken Woman in the Industry at Carlton Television's Women in Film and Television Awards. In 2007, Street-Porter starred in an ITV2 reality show, Deadline, serving as a tough-talking editor who worked with a team of celebrity "reporters" whose job it was to produce a weekly gossip magazine. She decided each week which of them to fire.

In 2011, Street-Porter became a regular panellist on ITV's chat show Loose Women. In 2013, she appeared in Celebrity MasterChef reaching the final three, and returned again for a Christmas special in 2020, in which she was crowned the winner. She also appeared on the television show QI. Street-Porter co-hosted BBC One cookery programme A Taste of Britain with chef Brian Turner, which ran for 20 episodes in 2014.

Street-Porter has appeared on many reality TV shows, including Call Me a Cabbie and So You Think You Can Teach; the latter saw her trying to work as a primary school teacher. She conducted numerous interviews with business figures and others for Bloomberg Television.

=== Newspaper work ===
Street-Porter became editor of The Independent on Sunday in 1999. Despite derision from her critics, she took the paper's circulation up to 270,460, an increase of 11.6 per cent. In 2001, Street-Porter became its editor-at-large, as well as writing a weekly column and regular features.

=== Other activities ===
A rambler, Street-Porter was president of the Ramblers' Association for two years from 1994. She walked across Britain from Dungeness in Kent to Conwy in Wales for the television series Coast to Coast in 1998. Street-Porter also walked from Edinburgh to London in a straight line in 1998, for a television series and her book, As the Crow Flies. In 1994, for the documentary series The Longest Walk, Street-Porter visited long-distance walker Ffyona Campbell on the last section of her round-the-world walk.

In 1966, Street-Porter appeared as an extra in the nightclub scene in Blowup, dancing in a silver coat and striped trousers. In 2003, she wrote and presented a one-woman show at the Edinburgh Festival titled All the Rage. She published the autobiographical Baggage in 2004, about her childhood in working class London. Its sequel is titled Fallout.

== Personal life ==
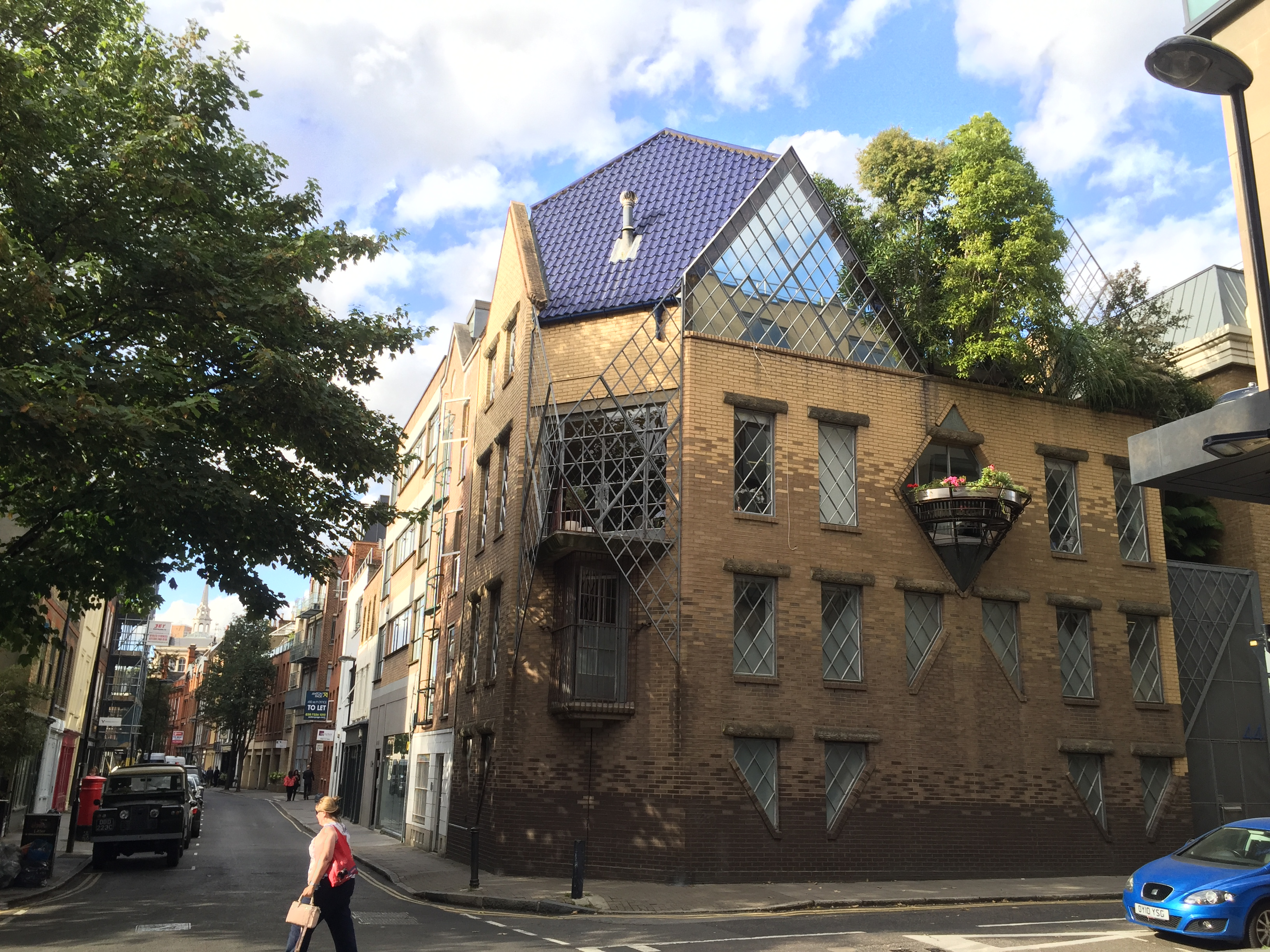
The Clerkenwell house commissioned by Janet Street-Porter. It was designed for her by Piers Gough in 1987. She sold it in 2001.

Street-Porter has been married five times. While studying architecture she married fellow student and photographer Tim Street-Porter, with whom she stayed until 1975 when she went on to marry Time Out editor Tony Elliott. Her third marriage was to film director Frank Cvitanovich, who was 19 years her senior, before a brief marriage in her fifties to 27-year-old David Sorkin. Before marrying Sorkin, she lived with DEF II presenter Normski for four years. In 1999, she began a long-term relationship with restaurateur Peter Spanton, who became her fifth husband on 31 January 2026. She has no children but has spoken frankly about having two abortions in the 1960s.

She currently lives in Haddiscoe in Norfolk, as well as in Kent and London. She previously had a home in Nidderdale, North Yorkshire. An active member of the Nidderdale community, she contributed her time and energy to a number of local causes. She was the president of the Burley Bridge Association, leading a campaign for a crossing over the River Wharfe, linking North and West Yorkshire.

=== Health ===
During the COVID-19 pandemic, Street-Porter regularly appeared as a guest on This Morning to review the political decisions taken by the government, alongside Matthew Wright, via video call from her home in Kent.

Street-Porter was diagnosed with basal-cell carcinoma, a type of skin cancer, in January 2020. On 23 June 2020, she announced the news on Loose Women (from home, via video call, owing to COVID-19 restrictions).

== Filmography ==
=== Film ===
Year	Title	Role	Notes
1966	Blowup	Dancing Girl	Uncredited
1967	Col cuore in gola	Salon Receptionist	aka Deadly Sweet and I Am What I Am. Uncredited

=== Television ===
Year	Title	Role	Notes
1975–1979	The London Weekend Show	Presenter	92 episodes
1976	BBC2 Playhouse	Robina Oliver	Episode 4.1: "The Mind Beyond: Meriel, the Ghost Girl"
1978–1989	Saturday Night People	Presenter	Unknown episodes
1980	Give Us a Clue	Panellist	Episode 3.8
1982–1983	The Six O'Clock Show	Co-Host	15 episodes
1983	At Home with Larry Grayson	Presenter	Television Special
1984	Willesee	Herself	1 episode; Doctor Who segment
1985	Saturday Night Out	Presenter	Television Special
1987	Open Space	Presenter	Episode 8.7: "The Page Three Debate"
1988	Wogan	Herself	1 episode
1989	Building Sights	Presenter	Episode 2.3: "Janet Street-Porter"
1994	The Longest Walk	Presenter	6 episodes
1994	The Last Word	Panellist	7 episodes
1995	Do the Right Thing	Panellist	2 episodes
1995	Street-Porter's Men	Host	4 episodes
1996–2025	Have I Got News for You	Guest panellist	19 episodes
1997	The Lily Savage Show	Herself	3 episodes
1998–2015	Question Time	Herself	19 episodes
2000	Cathedral Calls	Presenter	Unknown episodes
2001	Points of View	Guest presenter	2 episodes
2003–2013	This Week	Guest presenter	5 episodes
2004	I'm a Celebrity... Get Me Out of Here!	Herself	Participant on Series 4
2004–2011	The Wright Stuff	Guest panellist	7 episodes
2005	What the Papers Say	Presenter	1 episode
2005	So You Think You Can Teach	Herself	Unknown episodes
2005	8 Out of 10 Cats	Herself	Episode 1.7
2005–2010	The F Word	Co-Host	5 episodes
2006–2007	Call Me a Cabbie	Herself	8 episodes
2006	Never Mind the Full Stops	Herself	3 episodes
2007	Deadline	Herself	2 episodes
2008	Big Brother: Celebrity Hijack	Herself	Celebrity Hijacker on day 8
2008–2012	The One Show	Guest presenter	3 episodes
2009	The Money Programme	Reporter	Episode: "Media Revolution: Stop Press?"
2009	Would I Lie to You?	Herself	Episode 3.6
2009–2011	The Alan Titchmarsh Show	Herself	13 episodes
2010	Celebrity Juice	Herself	3 episodes
2011–present	Loose Women	Regular panellist	Guest Presenter (2021)
2012–2022	Countdown	Dictionary Corner Guest	63 episodes
2013	Celebrity MasterChef	Herself	Contestant on series 8
2013	QI	Guest panellist	Episode 11.11: "Kinky"
2013, 2017, 2021	Pointless Celebrities	Herself	3 episodes
2014	A Taste of Britain	Presenter	Episodes 1.2: "Cambridgeshire" and 1.15: "Oxfordshire"
2014	Benidorm	Reporter	Episode 6.5
2015	Alan Davies: As Yet Untitled	Guest panellist	2 episodes
2018	Harry Hill's Alien Fun Capsule	Guest panellist	2 episodes
2018	Hollyoaks	Herself	1 episode
2019	The Comedy Years	Presenter	3 episodes
2019	Neighbours	Herself	Cameo appearance; 1 episode
2026	Steal	Loose Women Panellist	Episode 1.6: "Dead Cat Bounce"

== Bibliography ==
- Scandal! (1981)
- The British Teapot (1983)
- Coast to Coast with Janet Street-Porter (1998)
- As the Crow Flies: A Walk from Edinburgh to London – in a Straight Line (1998)
- Baggage: My Childhood (2004)
- The Walk of Life (2005)
- Fall Out (2007)
- Life's Too F***ing Short (2008)
- Don't Let the B*****ds Get You Down (2009)

== Honours and awards ==
Street-Porter was appointed Commander of the Order of the British Empire (CBE) in the 2016 Birthday Honours for services to journalism and broadcasting.

Media offices
Preceded by Kim Fletcher	Editor of The Independent on Sunday; 1999–2002	Succeeded by Tristan Davies
