= Speightstown =

- Town
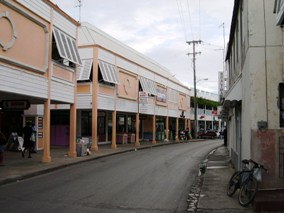
- Causal view of Queen's Street, Speightstown

- Location within Barbados
- Coordinates: 13°15′16″N 59°38′27″W
- Country: Barbados
- Parish: Saint Peter
- Elevation: 11 m (36 ft)

Population (2013)
  - Total: 3,634
- Website: Official website

Speightstown (/ˈspaɪtstaʊn/), also known as Little Bristol, is the second largest town in Barbados. It is situated 12 miles (19 km) north of the capital city of Bridgetown, in the northern parish of Saint Peter.

The area is named after William Speight, a member of Barbados' first Assembly during the Settlement years, and the former owner of the land where the town is located.

== History ==
Speightstown was formally settled around 1630 and in the earliest days of settlement was Barbados's busiest port (AMS Seaport Code: 27213, -- UN/LOCODE: BB SPT). Ships laden with sugar and other commodities left Speightstown bound directly for London and especially Bristol. For this reason Speightstown is sometimes known as Little Bristol. The "quaint town" has now become the centre of a tourist area as well as a northerly shopping district.

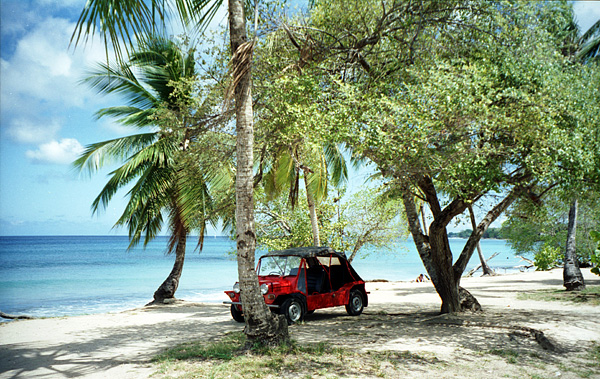
A Mini Moke rental car on a Speightstown beach (1995).

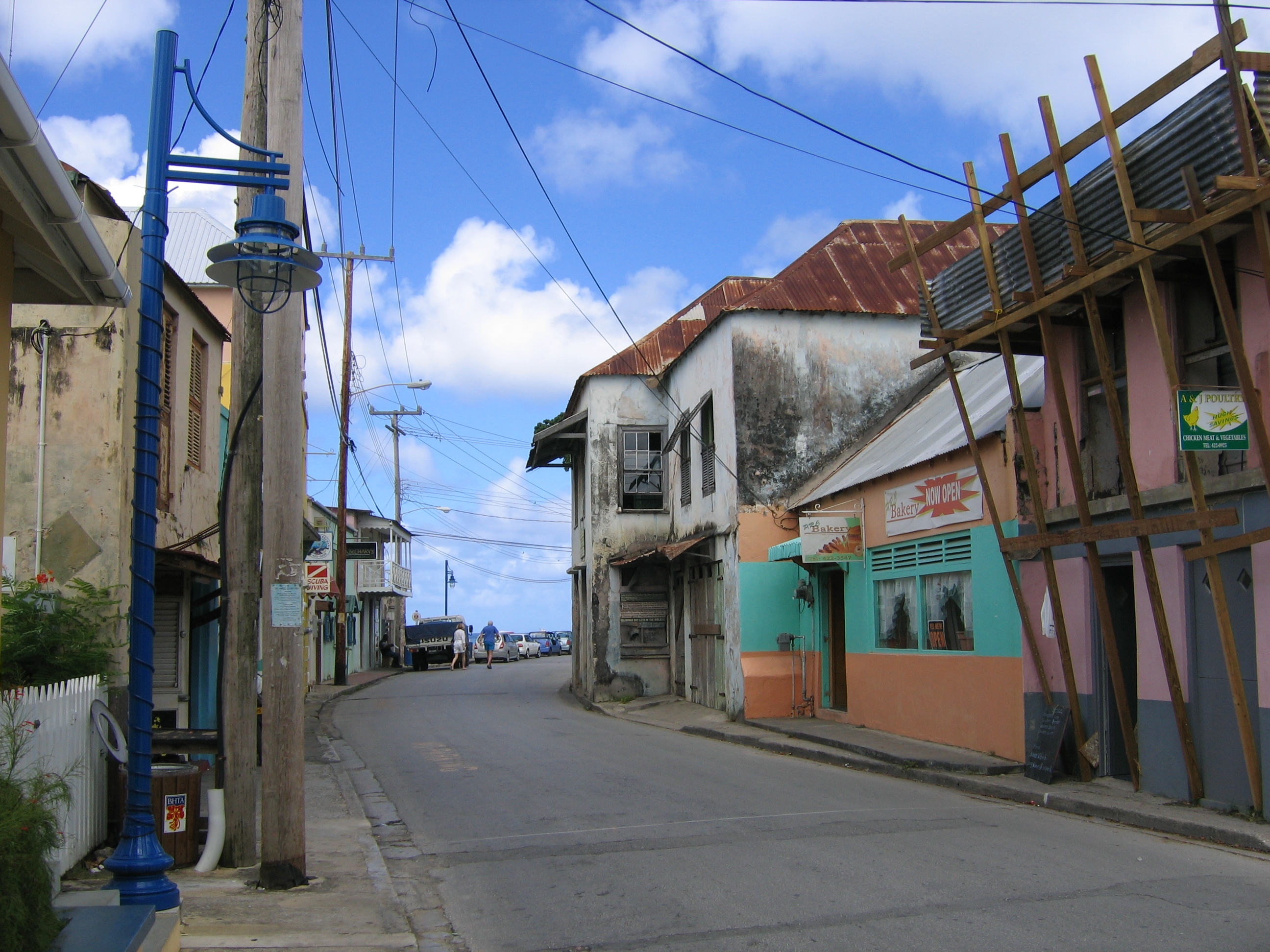
A downtown street.

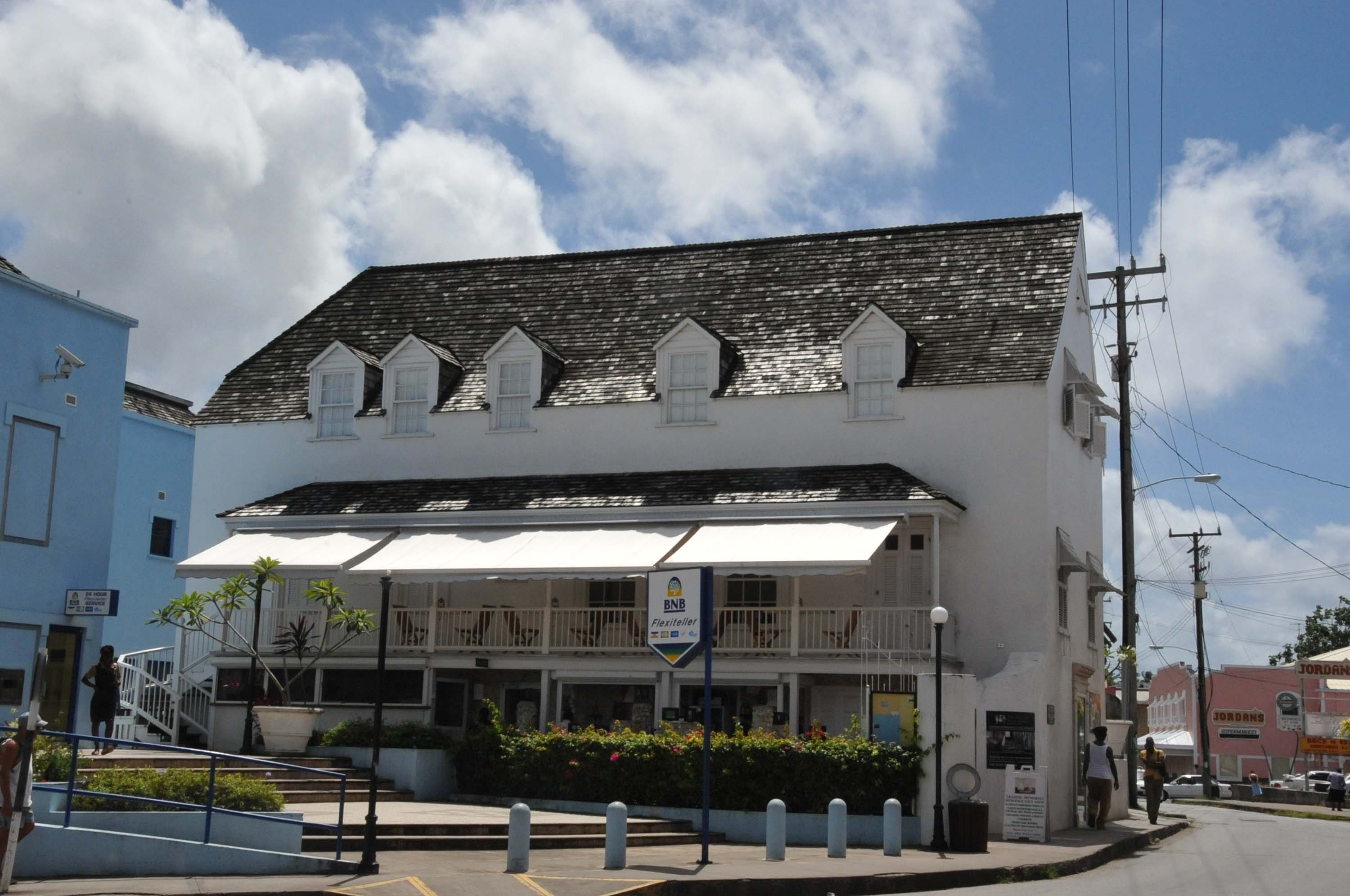
Arlington House.

The town itself is currently the subject of an archaeological research project, the Speightstown Community Archaeology Project (SCAP), which was established in 2010 and involves a collaboration between archaeologists and students of the University of Winchester, the University of the West Indies (Cave Hill) and Barbados Museums. To date work has focused upon an historic buildings categorisation of the town, graveyard memorial survey and excavations at the eighteenth-century coastal fort at Maycock's Bay to the north.

== Geography ==
=== Boundary ===
Through Statutory Instrument (S.I) 1984 No. 141, Road Traffic Act, CAP. 295, ROAD TRAFFIC REGULATIONS, and under Schedule Section # 6: The Boundaries of Bridgetown, Speightstown, Holetown and Oistin are cited as follows: 2) "Speightstown: (a) the section of Highway 1 from the entrance of the Alexandra School to Scantleburys Drive; (b) the section of Church Street from its junction with Highway 1 to its junction with Round the Town Road; (c) the section of Chapel Street from its junction with Highway 1 to its junction with Round the Town Road; (d) the whole section of Gooding Alley.

== Twin towns – sister cities ==
Speightstown has been twinned with:

- - Reading, Berkshire, England (since 2003)
- (United States) - Charleston, South Carolina (since November 1997), the original parts of which were based on the plans of Barbados's then capital city. Many dispossessed indigo, tobacco and cotton planters departed from Speightstown along with their slaves and helped found Charleston after there was a wholesale move to adopt sugar cane cultivation in Barbados; a land and labour-intensive enterprise which helped usher in the era of Trans-Atlantic Slave Trade in the British West Indies.

== Notable residents ==
- Actress Claudette Colbert spent six months annually in Speightstown after her retirement where she died and was laid to rest.
- Athlete and actor Oliver Skeete was born in Speightstown.
