= The Dark Side of Fame with Piers Morgan =

- Genre: Documentary
- Directed by: Colin Lennox
- Presented by: Piers Morgan
- Starring: Pamela Anderson; Jim Davidson; Jason Donovan; Tracey Emin; Mickey Rourke; Nancy Dell'Olio; Bruce Jones; Chantelle Houghton
- Country of origin: United Kingdom
- Original language: English
- No. of series: 1
- No. of episodes: 8

Production
- Producer: BBC Scotland
- Running time: 45 minutes

Original release
- Network: BBC One
- Release: 8 September – 27 October 2008

Related
- Piers Morgan's Life Stories

The Dark Side of Fame with Piers Morgan is a BBC television series presented by Piers Morgan exploring the downside of fame. The show follows an interview format in which each episode is devoted to one particular celebrity figure who has seen the "dark side of fame". Morgan, a former tabloid editor, questions the guest on these experiences. The show is similar in nature to another show Morgan previously presented on the BBC, You Can't Fire Me, I'm Famous!.

== Episodes ==
| No. | Guest | Original release date |
|---|---|---|
| 1 | Pamela Anderson | 8 September 2008 |
| 2 | Jim Davidson | 15 September 2008 |
| 3 | Jason Donovan | 22 September 2008 |
| 4 | Tracey Emin | 29 September 2008 |
| 5 | Mickey Rourke | 6 October 2008 |
| 6 | Nancy Dell'Olio | 13 October 2008 |
| 7 | Bruce Jones | 20 October 2008 |
| 8 | Chantelle Houghton | 27 October 2008 |

== Reception ==
The show has gained a negative critical reception.
