= Deadline (2007 TV series) =

- Presented by: Janet Street-Porter
- Voices of: Simon Allix
- Country of origin: United Kingdom
- Original language: English
- No. of series: 1
- No. of episodes: 14

Production
- Running time: 60 minutes (inc. adverts)
- Production company: Tiger Aspect Productions

Original release
- Network: ITV2
- Release: 4 April – 17 May 2007

Deadline is a reality television series, aired on ITV2 during April and May 2007. It featured ten celebrities compiling a magazine with Janet Street-Porter as the editor-in-chief.

== Content ==
Throughout the reality series, ten celebrities had to compile and construct a celebrity based magazine called Deadline, which was then added as a supplement in weekly issues of Closer Magazine. Each week, the celebrity figures had to fill the twelve empty pages of their Deadline magazine with real life stories, celebrity gossip and celebrity photographs.

The magazine was required to consist of one real life story, a celebrity interview and a gossip page. These ten celebrities were also required to take celebrity photos themselves and therefore become acquainted with a high-tech camera and establish themselves as a temporary member of the paparazzi. They had to photograph every celebrity they encountered and secure the picture for the all-important front page.

Each week, chief editor Janet Street-Porter, picture editor Darryn Lyons and copy editor Joe Mott were then required to decide on three celebrities who had performed the poorest and consequently sack one of the three celebrity journalists, basing their decision on their overall performance and participation within the formation of the magazine edition.

When it was time to reveal the celebrity who was going to be sacked, Street-Porter called all the remaining celebrities into the boardroom and gave the three chosen for a potential sacking, to justify why they should stay on the magazine. With no further discussion, Street-Porter instructed one of them to "clear your desk."

The final week of constructing the magazine consisted of just four celebrities. In the final minutes of the time working on the magazine, the four remaining celebrities were asked to enter the boardroom and two were told that they had not made the final two. The two who were believed to have performed the best on the magazine were asked to open an envelope which contained the final copy of the magazine, where they would see the winner's face printed on the front page. The winner of the series received a £50,000 "bonus".

== Celebrity participants ==
Participant	Occupation	Order
Christopher Parker	Actor	Sacked 1st
Lisa I'Anson	DJ and presenter	Sacked 2nd
Blair McDonough	Big Brother Australia Housemate and Actor	Sacked 3rd
Abi Titmuss	Model and presenter	Sacked 4th
Imogen Lloyd Webber	Author	Sacked 5th
Dean Holdsworth	Football player	Sacked 6th
Dom Joly	Comedian	Finalist
Ingrid Tarrant	Television personality	Finalist
Yvette Fielding	Television presenter	Runner Up
Iwan Thomas	Track and field athlete	Winner
