= Bleed Between the Lies =

Bleed Between The Lies

Studio album by Never A Hero
- Released: 23 November 2012
- Recorded: Monkey Puzzle Studios in Woolpit and Mad Hat Studios in Wolverhampton
- Genre: Rock; Metal; Alternative
- Label: Cinderella / Juke Bomb
- Producer: Rupert Mathews, Sheena Sear

Singles from Bleed Between The Lies
- 1. ""Burning Skies"" Released: 2 July 2012; 2. ""Screams Of Silence"" Released: 12 December 2012

Bleed Between The Lies is the debut album by British alt-metal band, Never A Hero. It was recorded at Monkey Puzzle House Studios in Woolpit and Mad Hat M2 Studios in Wolverhampton. On their YouTube channel, there are several videos documenting the band's recording sessions.

== Background ==
Originally titled Theatre of Disaster, the album saw many changes from its conception in 2010. Due to line-up changes and style changes, many of the songs on the album were dropped or re-written for release. Half of the album had been composed by the band while ex-member Toby C was still present but after his departure the group had around 6 months before recording to write the other half of the album. This can explain the eclectic mix of songs and genres present on the record. The majority of pre-production was done by Toby C in his studio Fat Nelly Recording Studios and in Drummer Daisy's bedroom with a mac-book and pro-tools.

== Style and themes ==
Almost all of the album is played in standard or drop-D tuning apart from Sunbeam and Untouchable in which rhythm parts are in drop-Csharp. Experimenting with electronics was always present in the band's previous endeavours but the arrival of dance music techniques (dubstep wub wubs, more elaborate synth lines) became forefront for some of the more heavier tracks. Lyrically, the themes range from anger aimed at certain individuals to stories about abuse, tales from beyond the grave and most notably the band's reaction to criticism on YouTube.

== Track listing ==
No.	Title	Length
1.	"Read Between The Lines"	1:03
2.	"Burning Skies"	3:23
3.	"Roses Are Dead, Violets Are Too"	4:43
4.	"The Call"	4:12
5.	"Screams Of Silence"	3:28
6.	"Days Of Patience"	4:10
7.	"Vogue"	3:18
8.	"Between"	1:30
9.	"Untouchable"	5:02
10.	"Dream Catcher"	3:37
11.	"Hollow"	3:51
12.	"Sunbeam"	2:39
13.	"Stalked"	4:37
14.	"Bleed Between The Lies"	1:31

== Personnel ==
- Phrixus - Vocals
- Kaji - Lead Guitar
- Mickey Thin - Rhythm Guitar, Vocals
- KB - Bass, Vocals
- Daisy Lai - Drums, Programming, Samples
- Heidi Stubbings - Guest Vocals
- Tom Povall - Composer
- Rupert Mathews - Producer, Engineer
- Sheena Sear - Producer, Engineer
