= Ben Foster (composer) =

British composer (born 1977)

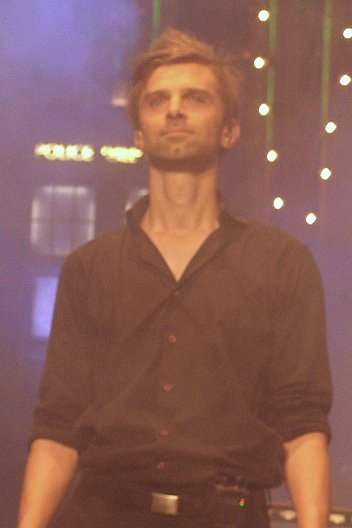
- Foster at the 2008 Doctor Who Prom.

Background information
- Born: Benedict Foster; 1977 (age 48–49)
- Occupations: Composer, orchestrator and conductor
- Website: www.mannersmcdade.co.uk/composer/ben-foster/

Ben Foster (born 1977) is a BAFTA award-winning British composer, best known for his work on the BBC series Torchwood and as orchestrator for Murray Gold on Doctor Who and for Marc Streitenfeld on Prometheus and The Grey. He is also known for his work as the conductor for Peter Gabriel's Scratch my Back world tour and albums, and for the BBC Proms Doctor Who events.

== Career ==
Foster studied Composition and Conducting at the Guildhall School of Music and Drama, graduating in 2000. He was awarded the Lutosławski composition prize. He is a graduate of the National Film and Television School, where he studied with Francis Shaw and Peter Howell (the latter having composed for the BBC series Doctor Who, with which Foster would later become associated).

=== Doctor Who and Torchwood ===
Since November 2005, Foster has worked as orchestrator and conductor for composer Murray Gold on Doctor Who. He also conducted the BBC National Orchestra of Wales in Doctor Who: A Celebration, which was held at the Wales Millennium Centre on 19 November 2006 in aid of Children in Need. The concert was followed by the release of the first Doctor Who Soundtrack CD which includes music from series 1 and 2 of the programme. This was released on 11 December 2006 on Silva Screen Records.

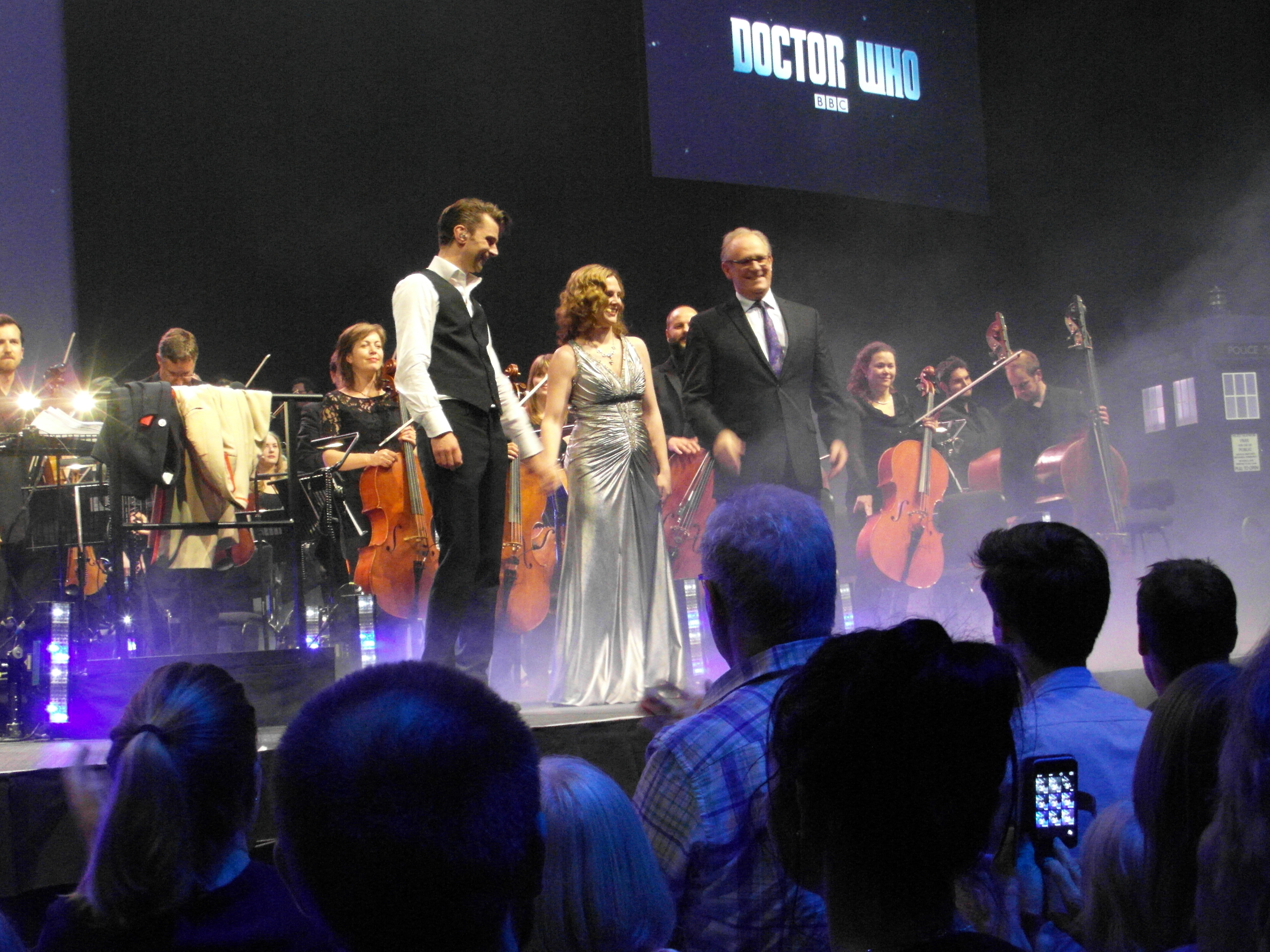
Foster, alongside Elin Manahan Thomas and Peter Davison at the Doctor Who Symphonic Spectacular in Leeds, 2015.

On 5 November 2007, Silva Screen Records released The Soundtrack from Series 3. On 17 November 2008, The Soundtrack from Series 4, followed 10 days later by the broadcast of the first Doctor Who Prom. Foster arranged the music and conducted the BBC Philharmonic at this event, which was part of The Proms. On 24 and 25 July 2010, Foster again arranged and conducted Murray Gold's scores from Seasons 4+5 in the Doctor Who Proms, an event followed by the release of The Doctor Who 2008–2010 specials soundtrack on 4 October, and the Series 5 soundtrack on 8 November. March 2011 saw the release of the soundtrack for the 2010 Christmas special, A Christmas Carol, and on 19 December of that year, the soundtrack for Series 6 was released. Foster arranged and conducted Gold's music from Series 6 and 7, as well as some music from the classic (1963–89) years by Tristram Cary, Martin Slavin, Malcolm Clarke, Dudley Simpson, Paddy Kingsland, Peter Howell and Mark Ayres, for the third Doctor Who prom, performed at the Royal Albert Hall in August 2013, which was followed by the soundtrack releases for the seventh series and the 2011 and 2012 Christmas specials, on 9 September and 21 October respectively.

He also acted as musical director and arranger for Doctor Who Live, which toured the UK in October–November 2010, conducting his 16-piece band.

Foster also composed music for the first three series of the BBC drama (and Doctor Who spin-off) Torchwood.

His work on the show has earned him three nominations in the Best Music category at the 2006, 2007 and 2009 BAFTA Cymru Awards. Silva Screen Records released a soundtrack album composed of his work on the first and second series in September 2008 and in July 2009 released the Children of Earth soundtrack. Foster conducted the Melbourne Symphony Orchestra in Doctor Who – A Symphonic Spectacular which took place on 4 February 2012, and 31 January 2014, at the Melbourne Convention and Exhibition Centre in Australia. In December 2012 he conducted Sydney-based Metropolitan Orchestra in the Doctor Who Symphonic Spectacular at the Sydney Opera House.

Foster left his role as Doctor Who conductor and orchestrator in 2015 and was replaced by Alastair King, who took up the role for Series 10.

=== Other works ===
As a composer, Foster's early professional work includes theme tunes to Love on a Saturday Night, The 1970's Office and The Great British Test Series all for LWT as well as a host of commercials, working for the Mcasso Music agency. Other commercials he has worked on include award winning commercials for Soundtree Music such as Sony Paint and the 2007 Sony Walkman.

Foster's resume as an orchestrator and conductor for film includes 27 Dresses, The Mummy 3, The Hitchhiker's Guide to the Galaxy, Robin Hood, Hoodwinked Too, The Grey.

In 2005 Foster re-arranged the theme tune to BBC Question Time which is currently running on BBC2.

Foster was a judge on the Blue Peter Music Makers project in 2006, a contributor to the Blue Peter Movie Makers project in 2007 and chair of the judging panel for BBC Young Musician of the Year 2008. He also contributed to the CBBC project Clash.

Ben's early work as an arranger and conductor included work for Hayley Westenra, Aled Jones, Gary Barlow, S Club 7, Boyzone, Toploader and others.

Ben has worked extensively with the singer and composer Peter Gabriel since 2009, conducting his last two studio albums with the New Blood Orchestra and touring the 'New Blood' project across the world.

He works regularly with the London Session Orchestra and the BBC National Orchestra of Wales and has also worked with the BBC Philharmonic, RPO, BBC Concert Orchestra and the Czech Film Orchestra.

Recent work includes the themes and music for BBC Cardiff Singer of the World (2011) and BBC Young Musician (2012). He also co-wrote the music (with Murray Gold) for Scott & Bailey for ITV1.

He composed the score and arranged songs for a biopic of Dame Shirley Bassey for BBC Two which aired in September 2011.

Foster has been credited within BBC One's 2014 drama Happy Valley closing titles as the 'Composer'.

In 2015, Foster and his brother Nick worked on the soundtrack for CITV's Thunderbirds Are Go.

In 2016, Foster and the BBC Scottish Symphony Orchestra had composed a revamped version of the opening theme for the BBC Scotland series "Still Game".

In 2024, Foster conducted the Royal Albert Hall orchestra for a television special featuring the singer Dua Lipa. The concert was recorded for a live album, Dua Lipa Live from the Royal Albert Hall, that was released on 6 December ahead of the special's airing.

== Filmography ==
=== Television ===
Year	Title	Role
2024	An Evening with Dua Lipa	Conductor
2023	The Beatles Now and Then	Strings Composer & Arranger
2022	Ridley	Composer
2015–2020	Thunderbirds Are Go!	Composer with Nick Foster
2017–2022	The Good Karma Hospital	Composer
2017–2019	Bounty Hunters	Composer with Nick Foster
2016–2019	Still Game	Conductor
2014–2020	Our Girl	Composer
2018	Troy: Fall of a City	Conductor
2017	Spy in the Wild	Conductor
2017	Sherlock	Conductor
2011–2016	Scott & Bailey	Composer
2014–2016	Happy Valley	Composer
2016	Mars	Orchestrator & Conductor
2015	Banana	Composer
2015	Old Jack's Boat: Rockpool Tales	Conductor
2015	Pets: Wild at Heart	Conductor
2014	Hidden Kingdoms	Composer
2014	Paul McCartney Hope for the Future	Strings Composer & Arranger
2005–2015	Doctor Who	Orchestrator & Conductor
2014	Dolphins: Spy in the Pod	Conductor
2013	The Last Witch	Composer
2012	Derren Brown: Fear and Faith	Composer
2012	Derren Brown: Apocalypse	Composer
2012	Winged Planet	Conductor
2012	Earthflight	Conductor
2011	Shirley (TV Movie)	Composer
2009	Girl Number 9	Composer
2006–2009	Torchwood	Composer with Murray Gold
2009	Torchwood: Inside the Hub	Composer
2007	Mist: Sheepdog Tales	Composer
2004	Love on a Saturday Night	Composer

=== Film ===
Year	Title	Role
2017	Wind River	Orchestrator & Conductor
2017	3 Way Junction	Orchestrator & Conductor
2016	All I See Is You	Orchestrator & Conductor
2016	Jackie	Orchestrator & Conductor
2015	Snow Chick: A Penguin's Tale	Conductor
2015	Ronaldo	Orchestrator & Conductor
2015	Poltergeist	Orchestrator & Conductor
2014	Noble	Composer
2014	Far from Men	Orchestrator & Conductor
2014	After the Fall	Orchestrator & Conductor
2014	The Theory of Everything	Conductor
2014	Wings	Conductor
2014	50 to 1	Orchestrator & Conductor
2013	Alone yet Not Alone	Conductor
2013	Prisoners	Conductor
2012	Playing for Keeps	Conductor
2012	Prometheus	Orchestrator & Conductor
2011	The Grey	Orchestrator & Conductor
2011	Hoodwinked Too! Hood vs. Evil	Orchestrator & Conductor
2011	Hella W	Conductor
2010	Burke & Hare	Additional Music
2010	Incendies	Conductor
2010	Letters to Juliet	Conductor
2010	Robin Hood	Conductor
2010	Leap Year	Orchestrator
2009	Veronika Decides to Die	Orchestrator
2009	The Countess	Orchestrator & Conductor
2009	Glorious 39	Orchestrator
2009	Nine	Conductor
2008	Franklyn	Orchestrator
2008	Is Anybody There?	Orchestrator
2008	Angus, Thongs and Perfect Snogging	Orchestrator
2008	The Mummy: Tomb of the Dragon Emperor	Orchestrator
2008	27 Dresses	Orchestrator
2007	I Want Candy	Orchestrator & Conductor
2007	Death at a Funeral	Orchestrator & Conductor
2006	Alien Autopsy	Orchestrator & Conductor
2005	The League of Gentlemen's Apocalypse	Additional orchestrator
2005	The Hitchhiker's Guide to the Galaxy	Additional orchestrator
