= Maycock's Bay, Barbados =

Bay of Barbados

Coordinates: 13°18′N 59°39′W

Maycock's Bay is located between Six Men's Bay and Harrison Point in St. Lucy, the northwest of Barbados. It is on the west coast of the island to the north. The area has multiple cliffs extending from Bird Rock to Archers Bay and from Stroud Bay to Maycocks Bay.

== Important Bird Area ==
Bird Rock, a rock stack some 30 metres (98 ft) offshore from the cliffs, has been designated an Important Bird Area (IBA) by BirdLife International because it supports a breeding colony of Sargasso shearwaters.
