= The Luvvies =

- The Awards the Stars Don't Want
- Country: United Kingdom
- Hosted by: Rhona Cameron
- First award: 2003
- Final award: 2004

Highlights
- Most awards: Russell Crowe (2)

Television/radio coverage
- Network: ITV
- Produced by: Dan Clapton; James Breen
- Directed by: Russell Norman; Mike Toppin

The Luvvies was an annual spoof awards ceremony that presented celebrities with awards that they "don't want". The awards ran twice, with the first in February 2003, and the second in January 2004. Both ceremonies were hosted by the Scottish comedian Rhona Cameron. They took place at Teddington Studios in London, and were broadcast on ITV1. Award categories included Love Rats, Naked Ambition and Ego of the Year; each category had a shortlist of three celebrities. During the ceremony, the shortlist for each category was read out, along with some footage of each nominee to illustrate the reason for their inclusion. The winner was then announced, followed by footage of him or her being doorstepped and presented with their trophy. Some winners, such as Patsy Palmer and Edwina Currie, accepted their awards, while others, such as Boy George and David Blaine, did not. A few winners, such as Simon Cowell and Jordan, showed up at the ceremony to receive their trophy in person.

Critical reaction to The Luvvies was generally negative. Writing about the 2004 awards, Frances Traynor of the Daily Record summarised the ceremony as "the show viewers really don't want to watch" and noted that "even Rhona Cameron looked bored". TV critic Charlie Brooker was particularly scathing, writing that the awards had "enraged" him and that "harassing the heartbroken for funnies is disgraceful". Cameron argued that "the key to accepting a Luvvie is not to take yourself too seriously", and said that if she were presented with a Luvvie she would "welcome it with open arms – otherwise you might look a bit po-faced and silly".

== Awards ==
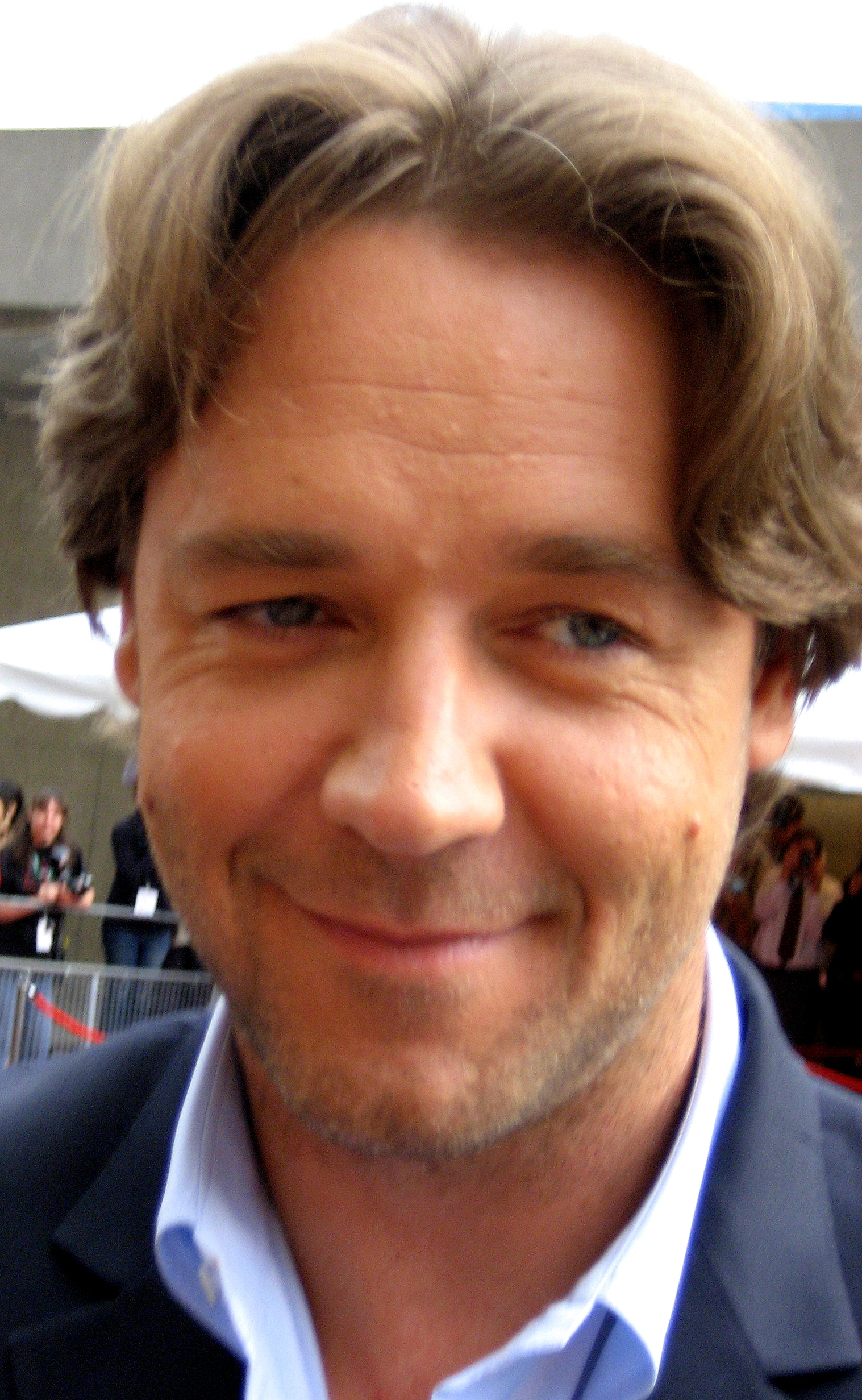
Russell Crowe is the only celebrity to win more than one Luvvie award.

Simon Cowell showed up at the 2003 ceremony to collect his award for Ego of the Year

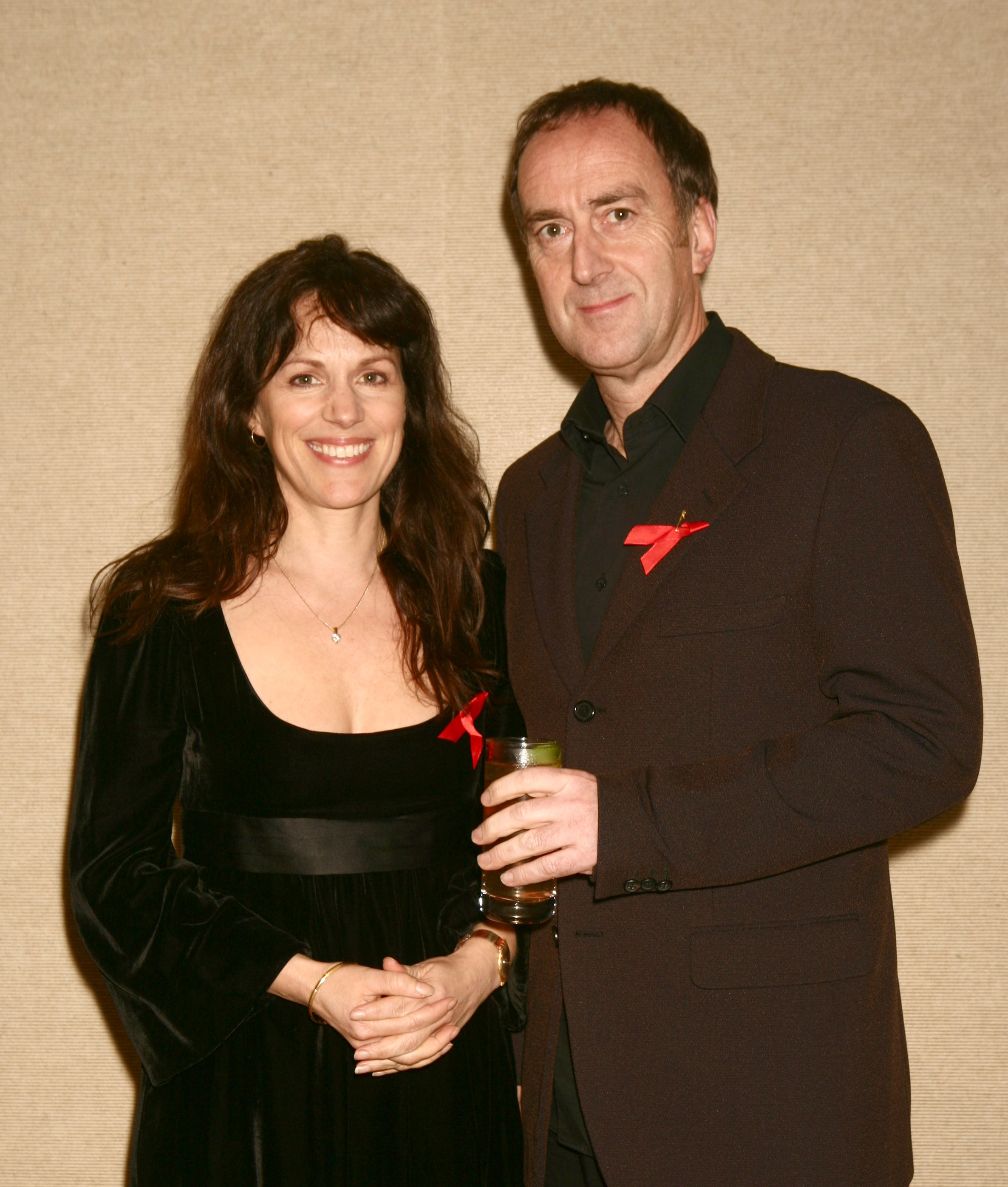
At the 2003 Luvvies, Angus Deayton (right) won the Love Rat award and was nominated for Worst Career Move.

=== 2003 ===
Naked Ambition	Love Rats
Tracy Shaw	Angus Deayton
Most Likely to Turn Up for the Opening of an Envelope	When Stars Attack
Jordan	Russell Crowe; Jay Kay; Liam Gallagher
The Odd Couple	Worst Career Move
John Major and Edwina Currie	Les Dennis; Angus Deayton; Tom Jones
Frock Horror	Rent-a-Celeb
Patsy Palmer	Neil and Christine Hamilton
You're So Vain	Ego of the Year
Boy George	Simon Cowell

=== 2004 ===
Romance	Catfight
Ben Affleck and Jennifer Lopez	Chris Eubank and Nigel Benn
You're So Vain	Attention Seeker
Russell Crowe	Peter Brame (Fame Academy)
Long Arm of the Law	Reality Star of the Year
Vinnie Jones	Bobby Davro
Frock Horror	Love Rats
Trinny and Susannah	Colin Farrell
Naked Ambition	Lead Balloon
Jodie Marsh	Jemini
Nice Knowing You	Ego of the Year
Kate Lawler	David Blaine
