= Playboy.co.uk =

Internet business

- Website type: entertainment, life & style, magazine website
- Available in: English
- Owner: PLBY Group
- Revenue: N/A
- Website: www.playboy.co.uk
- Commercial: yes
- Registration: N/A
- Launched: 2009 as free-access website
- Current status: redirects to playboy.com since 2012

Playboy.co.uk is an internet web address owned by the PLBY Group. Since 2012 it has redirected to playboy.com, but prior to that a separate website was maintained at the address.

Playboy.co.uk was originally operated on a paid-for-content basis. It was re-launched in February 2009 as a free-access website funded by advertising, with the bulk of its content free to users.

The re-launched website had editorial and video content that was advertiser-funded, including entertainment channels featuring movies, music, games, TV shows and sports along with a branded social networking element. Its "Life & Style" section included editorial and video content on grooming, fashion, food, gadgets and opinions, all reflecting the Playboy lifestyle.

Additionally, it also produced some original content that differed from print editions of the publications produced by Playboy Publishing.

== See also ==
- Home Video Channel
