= Totally Jodie Marsh =

- Advertising poster for the show, as seen on the wall of the London Underground
- Genre: Reality
- Directed by: Claudette Baker; Jamie Zwaig
- Starring: Jodie Marsh
- Country of origin: United Kingdom
- No. of episodes: 9

Production
- Executive producers: Danny Fenton; Jes Wilkins; Suzanne Readwin (for MTV)
- Producer: Kate Bates
- Running time: 30 minutes
- Production companies: Zig Zag Productions; Fearless Productions; MTV UK

Original release
- Network: MTV One
- Release: 22 July – 9 September 2007

Totally Jodie Marsh: Who'll Take Her Up the Aisle? is a British reality television series that saw glamour model Jodie Marsh audition a potential husband in London, Edinburgh, Sheffield, Birmingham, Cardiff and Bournemouth. The nine-part series, part of MTV's Totally strand, began on Sunday 22 July 2007 and culminated with Jodie marrying her 'Mr Right', Matt Peacock, on MTV One in September.

During an interview for Star Magazine, Jodie stated that as a businesswoman, she was doing this for the money as well as confiding that all her friends are getting married and having kids and she needs a husband.

The auditions themselves were not successful, as they drew fewer people than expected. From the beginning of the series, ratings dropped rapidly, and as a result, MTV One screened a double bill for episodes 4 and 5. Details of her marriage and venue were revealed before the show was halfway complete.

Marsh married former-boyfriend-of-Katie Price's Matt Peacock on 1 September 2007 at Sugar Hut, a nightclub in Essex. Another wedding ceremony was shown on MTV One on 2 September 2007 in her mum's back garden on Sunday.

The couple split up after three months.
