= Big Brother (British TV series) series 11 =

Coordinates: 51°39′23″N 0°16′02″W

Big Brother
- Series 11
- Series eleven logo
- Presented by: Davina McCall
- No. of days: 77
- No. of housemates: 21
- Winner: Josie Gibson
- Runner-up: Dave Vaughan
- Companion shows: Big Brother's Little Brother; Big Brother's Big Mouth; Big Brother Live
- No. of episodes: 86

Release
- Original network: Channel 4
- Original release: 9 June – 24 August 2010

Series chronology
- ← Previous; Series 10 Next → Series 12

Big Brother 2010, also known as Big Brother 11, is the eleventh series of the British reality television series Big Brother, and the final series of the show to be broadcast by Channel 4. The show followed twenty-one contestants, known as housemates, who were isolated from the outside world for an extended period of time in a custom-built House. Each week, one or more of the housemates were evicted by a public vote. The last remaining housemate, Josie Gibson, was declared the winner, winning a cash prize of £100,000 and a place as a Housemate on Ultimate Big Brother, an all-star edition of Big Brother which began immediately after the conclusion of Big Brother 2010

It launched on 9 June 2010 and ended on 24 August 2010, lasting 77 days - the shortest run since the fifth series in 2004. Davina McCall returned as presenter for the eleventh and final time. Fourteen housemates entered on launch night, with seven additional housemates being introduced in later weeks. The series was watched by an average of 3 million viewers.

Following Channel 4's decision in 2009 not to renew their contract with Endemol to show the series, Channel 5 bought the rights to Big Brother in the United Kingdom, where it was broadcast from 18 August 2011 to 5 November 2018, initially hosted by Brian Dowling from Celebrity Big Brother 8 to Celebrity Big Brother 11 and later with Emma Willis from Big Brother 14 to Big Brother 19.

== Format ==
The theme for this series was carnival. Like always, housemates entered the House with no contact with the outside world. Each week, the housemates took part in a compulsory task that determined the amount of money they were allocated to spend on their shopping; if they passed, they received a luxury budget and they were allocated a basic budget if they failed. Housemates nominated two housemates for eviction every week. In a new nominations twist revealed on Day 6, the nominated housemates were allowed to escape nominations with a weekly Save and Replace challenge. The Save and Replace winner is exempt from nominations, however, they must replace themselves with another housemate of their choice for eviction. This nominations twist that was held every week is similar to the Power of Veto from the American version of Big Brother.

=== Eviction format ===
The eviction format saw a number of changes, at the beginning of an eviction show, a round-up of the weeks events - featuring newspaper headlines - would be shown to viewers. This series saw the return of McCall announcing the eviction from outside the house with the housemates hearing the live audience cheering, booing and chanting. Occasionally, If more than two housemates faced eviction, McCall would announce which nominee(s) will be safe, however, this was only done a handful of times (Week 1, 2 and 7), three housemates face eviction in Weeks 3, 5 and 8, and four in Week 9, where no announcement of who was safe was announced, in Week 10 eight housemates faced the public vote which would lead to the first ever quadruple eviction, out of the four times McCall spoke to the house she would announce one nominee who was safe and then announce the evictee who would have to leave immediately. The eviction announcements were made in no particular order (see Nominations Table), John James received the highest number of eviction votes, followed by Corin, Sam and Steve, however the order they left the house was Steve, Corin, Sam and John James.

Another change to the eviction format was the housemates 'best bits' getting shown before the interview rather than at the end as in every other series - although the previous Celebrity series adopted this format. The panel format used in the eviction interviews the previous year did not return, instead McCall interviewed the evictee in a one-on-one format, however, for the first time ever, viewers could call in with questions to ask the evictee. Also, evictees were shown goodbye messages the housemates recorded for them in the event of their departure, similar to the format used in the American version of the show. The new eviction format continued for Ultimate Big Brother, the only difference that all interviews were performed outside of the studio.

== Housemates ==
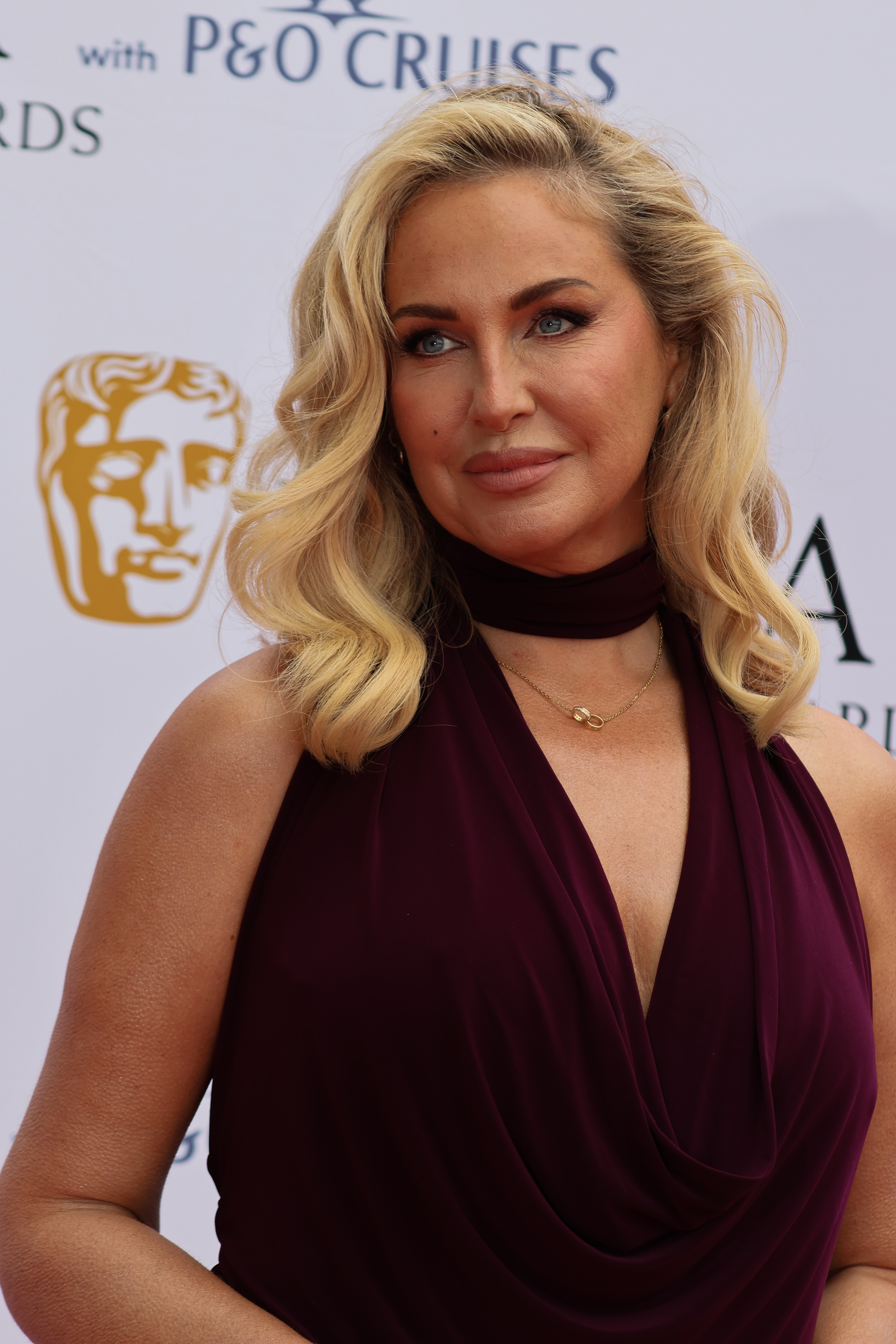
Josie Gibson

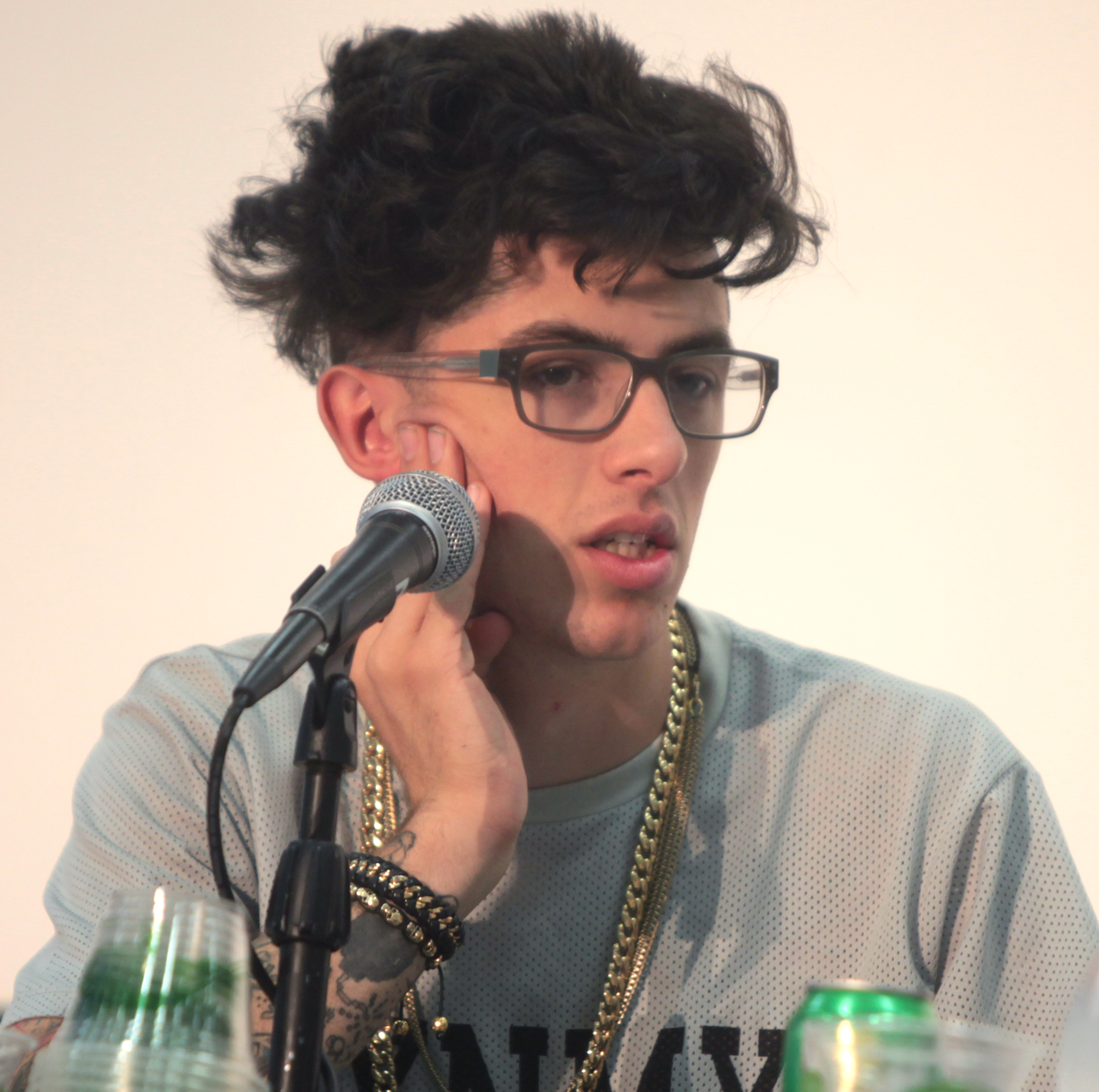
Sam Pepper

On Day 1, eighty-one hopefuls arrived at the entrance of the House – seventy-nine of whom had been revealed before the series began. Only fourteen housemates were selected to enter out of all candidates. The first thirteen were selected by Big Brother, and the fourteenth housemate (Mario) was selected by a random draw. Three new housemates (Andrew, Keeley and Rachel), whose identities were revealed on the Channel 4 website on Day 30, arrived in the House by spaceship during the Day 31 eviction show. On Day 45, three more new housemates (JJ, Jo and Laura) were selected to enter the House by the current housemates from a choice of six. These six were among those not chosen to enter the House on Day 1. After Laura walked, Sam, who was one of the three not selected on Day 45, entered the House on Day 52 as part of the "Ignore the Obvious" task.

Name	Age on entry	Hometown	Day entered	Day exited	Result
Josephine "Josie" Gibson	25	Bristol	1	77	Winner
Dave Vaughan	39	Pontypool	1	77	Runner-up
Mario Mugan	28	Essex	1	77	3rd place
Joe-John "JJ" Bird	23	Peterborough	45	77	4th place
Andrew Edmonds	19	Wimborne Minster, Dorset	31	77	5th place
John James Parton	24	Melbourne, Australia	1	73	Evicted
Samuel "Sam" Pepper	21	Kent	52	73	Evicted
Corin Forshaw	29	Stockport	1	73	Evicted
Steve Gill	41	Leicester	1	73	Evicted
Jo Butler	41	Luton	45	66	Evicted
Rachel Ifon	29	Liverpool	31	59	Evicted
Benjamin "Ben" Duncan	27	London	1	52	Evicted
Laura McAdam	20	Stratford-upon-Avon	45	50	Walked
Keeley Johnson	30	Manchester	31	45	Walked
Caoimhe Guilfoyle	22	Dublin	1	42	Walked
Gloria "Ife" Kuku	25	Milton Keynes	1	38	Evicted
Nathan Dunn	26	Bingley, West Yorkshire	1	31	Evicted
Keeley "Shabby Katchadourian" Flanders	24	London	1	27	Walked
Yvette "Sunshine" Martyn	24	Peterborough	1	24	Evicted
Govan Hinds	21	Leicester	1	17	Evicted
Rachael White	23	Nottingham	1	10	Evicted

== Nominations table ==
	Week 1	Week 2	Week 3	Week 4	Week 5	Week 6	Week 7	Week 8	Week 9	Week 10	Week 11 Final		Nominations received
Josie	Dave, Sunshine	Dave, Ben	Dave, Sunshine	Nathan, Corin	Ife, Dave	~~Caoimhe~~, Dave	Ben, Mario	Mario, Steve	JJ, Andrew	No nominations	Winner (Day 77)		5
Dave	Govan, Rachael	Govan, Shabby	Shabby, Caoimhe	Ife, Caoimhe	Ife, Corin	~~Caoimhe~~, Keeley	Banned	Steve, Mario	Mario, Jo	No nominations	Runner-up (Day 77)		20
Mario	Shabby, Corin	Govan, Shabby	Corin, Shabby	Corin, Steve	Josie, Caoimhe	Josie, ~~Caoimhe~~	Ben, Steve	Josie, John James	Dave, JJ	No nominations	Third place (Day 77)		12
JJ	Not in House						Exempt	Rachel, Steve	Steve, Mario	No nominations	Fourth place (Day 77)		3
Andrew	Not in House				Exempt	Corin, Rachel	Rachel, Steve	Rachel, Mario	Sam, Steve	No nominations	Fifth place (Day 77)		4
John James	Rachael, Shabby	Caoimhe, Shabby	Ben, Dave	Caoimhe, Ben	Corin, Ife	Keeley, Corin	Ben, Andrew	Rachel, Mario	Corin, Mario	No nominations	Evicted (Day 73)		16
Sam	Not in House							Exempt	Dave, Jo	No nominations	Evicted (Day 73)		2
Corin	Caoimhe, Sunshine	Ben, Mario	John James, Mario	Caoimhe, John James	Caoimhe, John James	~~Caoimhe~~, Rachel	Rachel, Andrew	Rachel, Jo	Sam, Jo	No nominations	Evicted (Day 73)		11
Steve	Sunshine, Shabby	Govan, Ben	Caoimhe, Shabby	Ben, John James	Ben, John James	~~Caoimhe~~, Rachel	John James, Josie	John James, Josie	JJ, Mario	No nominations	Evicted (Day 73)		12
Jo	Not in House						Exempt	John James, Andrew	Corin, Dave	Evicted (Day 66)			4
Rachel	Not in House				Exempt	Ben, ~~Caoimhe~~	John James, Ben	Mario, John James	Evicted (Day 59)				9
Ben	Shabby, Sunshine	Govan, Shabby	Nathan, Shabby	Ife, John James	Ife, Steve	John James, Steve	Steve, John James	Evicted (Day 52)					20
Laura	Not in House						Exempt	Walked (Day 50)					N/A
Keeley	Not in House				Exempt	~~Caoimhe~~, ~~John James~~	Walked (Day 45)						2
Caoimhe	Sunshine, Dave	Sunshine, Ben	Dave, Sunshine	Nathan, Ife	Ife, Corin	Banned	Walked (Day 42)						21
Ife	Sunshine, Steve	Ben, Dave	Dave, Sunshine	Caoimhe, Ben	Caoimhe, Ben	Evicted (Day 38)							8
Nathan	Sunshine, Ben	Sunshine, Ben	Sunshine, Dave	Caoimhe, John James	Evicted (Day 31)								4
Shabby	Sunshine, Dave	Ben, Dave	Sunshine, Dave	Walked (Day 27)									14
Sunshine	Govan, Shabby	Caoimhe, Nathan	Caoimhe, Shabby	Evicted (Day 24)									17
Govan	Sunshine, Dave	Dave, Ben	Evicted (Day 17)										6
Rachael	Dave, Sunshine	Evicted (Day 10)											2
Notes	none				1	2	3	4	5	6	7		
Nominated (pre-save and replace)	Dave, Shabby, Sunshine	Ben, Dave, Govan, Shabby	Dave, Shabby, Sunshine	Caoimhe, John James	Caoimhe, Corin, Ife	Corin, Keeley, Rachel	Ben, Dave, John James, Steve	John James, Mario, Rachel	Dave, JJ, Jo, Mario	none	none		
Saved	Dave	Shabby	Dave	Caoimhe	Caoimhe	Task abandoned and nominations voided	Steve	Mario	Mario	Josie	none		
Against public vote	Rachael, Shabby, Sunshine	Ben, Dave, Govan, Mario	Caoimhe, Shabby, Sunshine	John James, Nathan	Corin, Ife, Mario	Task abandoned and nominations voided	Andrew, Ben, Dave, John James	Dave, John James, Rachel	Dave, JJ, Jo, Sam	Andrew, Corin, Dave, JJ, John James, Mario, Sam, Steve	Andrew, Dave, JJ, Josie, Mario		
Walked	none			Shabby	none	Caoimhe, Keeley	Laura	none					
Evicted	Rachael; 37.5% to evict	Govan; 72.0% to evict	Sunshine; 42.0% to evict	Nathan; 89.0% to evict	Ife; 56.5% to evict	Eviction cancelled	Ben; 52.0% to evict	Rachel; 58.5% to evict	Jo; 39.4% to evict	Steve; 9.8% to evict	Andrew; 3.9% (out of 5)	JJ; 4.5% (out of 5)	
Evicted	Rachael; 37.5% to evict	Govan; 72.0% to evict	Sunshine; 42.0% to evict	Nathan; 89.0% to evict	Ife; 56.5% to evict	Eviction cancelled	Ben; 52.0% to evict	Rachel; 58.5% to evict	Jo; 39.4% to evict	Corin; 20.6% to evict	Mario; 5.1% (out of 5)	Dave; 9.1% (out of 5)	
Evicted	Rachael; 37.5% to evict	Govan; 72.0% to evict	Sunshine; 42.0% to evict	Nathan; 89.0% to evict	Ife; 56.5% to evict	Eviction cancelled	Ben; 52.0% to evict	Rachel; 58.5% to evict	Jo; 39.4% to evict	Sam; 14.6% to evict	Josie; 77.5% to win		
Evicted	Rachael; 37.5% to evict	Govan; 72.0% to evict	Sunshine; 42.0% to evict	Nathan; 89.0% to evict	Ife; 56.5% to evict	Eviction cancelled	Ben; 52.0% to evict	Rachel; 58.5% to evict	Jo; 39.4% to evict	John James; 34.2% to evict	Josie; 77.5% to win		
Source													

Notes

- ^Note 1: As new housemates, Andrew, Keeley and Rachel could not nominate and could not be nominated by their fellow housemates. During that week, they also could not be replaced in the Save and Replace task.
- ^Note 2: As punishment for discussing nominations, Caoimhe was banned from nominating and Keeley's nominations were voided. Caoimhe later walked from the house, meaning Corin, Keeley and Rachel were up for eviction. Had this not happened then Caoimhe and Rachel would have been up for eviction. The Save and Replace task was abandoned due to Keeley being injured during the task. Keeley was taken to hospital on Day 42 and Week 6's eviction was cancelled shortly after. On Day 45 Keeley decided to recuperate further at home and not return to the House.
- ^Note 3: As new housemates, JJ, Jo and Laura could not nominate and could not be nominated by their fellow housemates. During that week, they also could not be replaced in the Save and Replace task. As punishment for discussing nominations, Dave was banned from nominating and automatically faced eviction, along with the two or more housemates who received the most nominations.
- ^Note 4: As a new housemate, Sam could not nominate and could not be nominated by his fellow housemates. During that week, he also could not be replaced in the Save and Replace task.
- ^Note 5: As punishment for talking about nominating Sam, Dave, John James, and Josie were banned from nominating him that week. However, they could have still replaced themselves with Sam if they had been nominated and won the Save and Replace task. Housemates nominated face-to-face in "Nasty Nominations" in the garden, in which housemates had to pour horrible substances over the two housemates they chose to nominate (a reason for nomination was not required). As punishment for discussing nominations, Dave could not participate in the Save and Replace task.
- ^Note 6: On Day 66, housemates had one minute to decide together whom to give a ticket to the final. They chose Josie, therefore saving her from eviction. The rest of the housemates faced eviction. Had nominations taken place, Sam would have been banned from nominating for discussing nominations. That week, the four housemates with the most votes were evicted in no particular order.
- ^Note 7: For the final four days, the public were voting for who they wanted to win, rather than evict. Unlike previous series where the lines would freeze intermittently for a vote count to take place, the lines closed for good before the housemate finishing fifth was announced.

== Weekly summary ==
Week 1	Entrances	On Day 1, Josie, Steve, Ben, Rachael, Nathan, Dave, Caoimhe, Govan, Shabby, Ife, John James, Sunshine and Corin entered the house. Mario was then selected at random to enter the house.
Week 1	Twists	Upon entering the house, Mario was given an "impossible task" by Big Brother, which forced him to wear a mole outfit with a sign saying "I AM A MOLE". Big Brother then told the housemates that there was a mole living in the house with them. If the majority of the house suspected him as a mole, he would be immediately evicted from the house. The housemates all incorrectly guessed that Mario was the mole, and he remained in the house as an official housemate.
Week 1	Tasks	On Day 2, the housemates were given their first shopping task. All housemates, except Sunshine, had a meal at a dining table suspended forty meters in the air. Sunshine then had to depict five headlines from the previous night's newspapers on a giant notepad in the garden. For every correct answer the housemates at the dining table guessed, the housemates received £100 for next week's shopping budget. Housemates guessed two correctly and won £200 for shopping.; On Day 3, the housemates had to put on as much of their clothes as they could within 4 minutes. The housemates received all of the clothes that they were wearing. Any extra clothing was confiscated.; On Day 7, the housemates were given a task in which they had to test out three new gameshow pilots to replace Big Brother on Channel 4. Housemates won an additional £200 towards their shopping budget.; On Day 10, the housemates won a special World Cup barbecue after seven housemates blew vuvuzelas non-stop for 90 minutes.
Week 1	Nominations	On Day 6, the housemates nominated for the first time. Dave, Shabby and Sunshine received the most nominations and were nominated for eviction.
Week 1	Save Competition	On Day 6, the housemates were told that this season, all the nominees will compete in a competition to save themselves from eviction. Dave, Shabby and Sunshine took part in the "Hickory Dickory Dock" competition. Dave won the competition and saved himself from eviction. He was then told that he would have to replace himself with another housemates. He chose to nominate Rachael, meaning Rachael, Shabby and Sunshine faced the public vote.
Week 1	Exits	On Day 10, Rachael was evicted from the house, receiving 37.5% of the public vote to evict.
Week 2	Tasks	On Day 15, the housemates were given their second shopping task, which had housemates take part in backwards day. After undoing a completed key jigsaw, they later had to work out how to put it back together within a time limit. The housemates passed their shopping task.
Week 2	Punishments	Due to persistent rule breaking, the housemates were forced to live on basic rations until further notice.
Week 2	Nominations	On Day 13, the housemates nominated for the second time. Ben, Dave, Govan and Shabby received the most nominations and were nominated for eviction.
Week 2	Save Competition	On Day 13, Ben, Dave, Govan and Shabby competed in the "Scooter Slide" task to determine who would save themselves from eviction. Shabby won the competition and saved herself from eviction. She then nominated Mario to take her place, meaning Ben, Dave, Govan and Mario faced the public vote.
Week 2	Exits	On Day 17, Govan was evicted from the house, receiving 72% of the public vote to evict.
Week 3	Tasks	On Day 18, the housemates competed in a penalty shootout contest against the housemates in the German Big Brother House. The housemates won the task and won the opportunity to see the England v Germany game in the first knockout stage of the World Cup.; On Day 19, the housemates had to talk through puppets of themselves for a period of time to win Steve a birthday party. They passed this task and won Steve a birthday party.; The housemates celebrated International joke day for this week's shopping task. They had to take on various joke stereotypes, including a dumb blonde and an Englishman, an Irishman and a Scotsman. The housemates passed their shopping task.
Week 3	Nominations	On Day 20, the housemates nominated for the third time. Dave, Shabby and Sunshine received the most nominations and were nominated for eviction.
Week 3	Save Competition	On Day 20, Dave, Shabby and Sunshine competed in the "Your Face on TV" task to determine who would save themselves from eviction. Dave won the competition and saved himself from eviction. He then nominated Caoimhe to take his place, meaning Caoimhe, Shabby and Sunshine faced the public vote.
Week 3	Exits	On Day 24, Sunshine was evicted from the house, receiving 42% of the public vote to evict.
Week 4	Tasks	On Day 26, the housemates took part in a wheelchair basketball task. The winning team of Corin, Ife, John James, Nathan and Steve won a party.; The housemates were given their fourth shopping task, in which Big BroBot took over the Big Brother house. Housemates were required to complete a series of Man v Machine tasks against Titan. Any housemate who lost a task was made into a robot. Housemates who remained humans at the end of the task had to play against "Bigger Brother" in a game similar to Robot Wars. The housemates failed their shopping task.
Week 4	Nominations	On Day 27, the housemates nominated for the fourth time. Caoimhe and John James received the most nominations and were nominated for eviction.
Week 4	Save Competition	On Day 27, Caoimhe and John James competed in the "Stay on TV" task to determine who would save themselves from eviction. Caoimhe won the competition and saved herself from eviction. She then nominated Nathan to take her place, meaning John James and Nathan faced the public vote.
Week 4	Exits	On Day 27, Shabby walked from the house.; On Day 31, Nathan was evicted from the house, receiving 89% of the public vote to evict.
Week 5	Entrances	On Day 31, Andrew, Keeley and Rachel entered the house.
Week 5	Tasks	The housemates were given their fifth weekly shopping task. The male housemates were kidnapped by the Uber Cougar and had to live in the Uber Cougar's lair. The female housemates became superheroes and had to complete tasks to release the male housemates. The housemates passed their shopping task.
Week 5	Nominations	On Day 34, the housemates nominated for the fifth time. Caoimhe, Corin and Ife received the most nominations and were nominated for eviction. Due to being new housemates, Andrew, Keeley and Rachel were exempt from the nomination process.
Week 5	Save Competition	Caoimhe, Corin and Ife competed in the "Paintball Duel" task to determine who would save themselves from eviction. Caoimhe won the competition and saved herself from eviction. She then nominated Mario to take her place, meaning Corin, Ife and Mario faced the public vote.
Week 5	Exits	On Day 38, Ife was evicted from the house, receiving 56.5% of the public vote to evict.
Week 6	Tasks	The housemates were given their sixth weekly shopping task. The housemates joined the Glee club of "BB High". They had to audition for roles in their own version of "Don't Stop Believin'". They filmed a music video with the help of Pineapple Dance Studios. Andrew and Corin were also tasked to sing "(I've Had) The Time of My Life" in front of the eviction crowd. The housemates passed their shopping task.
Week 6	Punishments	Due to discussing nominations, Caoimhe was banned from nominating this week.
Week 6	Nominations	On Day 41, the housemates nominated for the sixth time. Caoimhe and Rachel received the most nominations and were nominated. However, Caoimhe walked from the house the next day, meaning that the next housemate with the highest number of nominations would be nominated. Corin and Keeley both received the next highest number of nominations and were nominated alongside Rachel.
Week 6	Save Competition	On Day 42, Corin, Keeley and Rachel competed in the next task to determine who would save themselves from eviction. During the competition, Keeley hurt her ankle and was forced to leave the house for treatment. This competition was eventually cancelled.
Week 6	Exits	On Day 42, Caoimhe decided to walk from the house.; On Day 45, Keeley decided not to return to the house after fracturing her ankle. The eviction that was scheduled was eventually cancelled.
Week 7	Entrances	On Day 45, the housemates had to choose 3 new housemates from 6 potential housemates to enter the house. JJ, Jo, Joel, Laura, Megan and Sam were the choices. The housemates chose JJ, Jo and Laura to enter the house. They entered the house on Day 45.
Week 7	Tasks	The housemates were given their seventh weekly shopping task which was to "Ignore the Obvious". They had to ignore various distractions in the house, such as a brass band, an estate agent showing potential buyers through the house, tourists walking around the house taking pictures, Marcus Bentley conducting his narrations from within the house, Davina McCall hosting part of the eviction show from inside the house, and a performance from Jedward. The housemates passed their shopping task.
Week 7	Nominations	On Day 48, the housemates nominated for the seventh time. Ben, Dave, John James and Steve received the most nominations and were nominated for eviction.
Week 7	Save Competition	Ben, Dave, John James and Steve competed in the "Battle of the Brides" task to determine who would save themselves from eviction. Steve won the competition and saved himself from eviction. He then nominated Andrew to take his place, meaning Andrew, Ben, Dave and John James faced the public vote.
Week 7	Exits	On Day 50, Laura walked from the house.; On Day 52, Ben was evicted from the house, receiving 52% of the public vote to evict.
Week 8	Entrances	On Day 52, Sam entered the house.
Week 8	Tasks	The housemates were given a playground endurance task. Andrew won this task.; This week the housemates were given their eighth weekly shopping task, which housemates had to portray characters from Charles Dickens novels. As part of this, John James and Rachel had to sit in a dining room chair for 24 hours, portraying the Great Expectations character Miss Havisham. Corin had to portray Scrooge and give out coins when the others begged. The other housemates had to perform "Consider Yourself" from Oliver Twist and for the video to be viewed on the Big Brother website at least 100,000 times. The housemates passed their shopping task.
Week 8	Nominations	On Day 55, The housemates nominated for the eighth time. John James, Mario and Rachel received the most nominations and were nominated for eviction.
Week 8	Save Competition	John James, Mario and Rachel competed in a task to determine who would save themselves from eviction. Mario won the competition and saved himself from eviction. He then nominated Dave to take his place, meaning Dave, John James and Rachel faced the public vote.
Week 8	Exits	On Day 59, Rachel was evicted from the house, receiving 58.5% of the public vote to evict.
Week 9	Tasks	The housemates were given their ninth weekly shopping task. The housemates competed to become the ultimate pantomime housemate. JJ and John James won and competed in the annual pantomime horse race at Sandown Park Race Course. The housemates passed their shopping task.
Week 9	Nominations	On Day 62, The housemates nominated for the ninth time. Dave, JJ, Jo and Mario received the most nominations and were nominated for eviction.
Week 9	Save Competition	JJ, Jo and Mario competed in a task to determine who would save themselves from eviction. Dave was banned from competing after attempting to influence nominations. Mario won the competition and saved himself from eviction. He then nominated Sam to take his place, meaning Dave, JJ, Jo and Sam faced the public vote.
Week 9	Exits	On Day 66, Jo was evicted from the house, receiving 39.2% of the public vote to evict.
Week 10	Twists	On Day 66, the housemates were required to choose one housemate to be given a ticket to the final. Everyone chose Josie, meaning she earned a ticket to the final.
Week 10	Tasks	On Day 71, ex-housemates Ben, Nathan and Rachael returned to the house as part of a task.
Week 10	Nominations	This week no nominations took place. Instead, all housemates, except for Josie who had a ticket to the final, were nominated for eviction, meaning Andrew, Corin, Dave, JJ, John James, Mario, Sam and Steve faced the public vote. As a result of this, no save competition took place.
Week 10	Exits	On Day 73, Steve, Corin, Sam and John James were evicted from the house, respectively, receiving 9.8%, 20.6%, 14.6% and 34.2% of the public vote to evict, respectively.
Week 11	Exits	On Day 77, Andrew left the house in fifth place, JJ left the house in fourth place and Mario left the house in third place. It was revealed that Josie was the winner, leaving Dave as the runner-up.

=== House flood ===
On the evening of Day 70 the house suffered from a freak rainstorm, resulting in the evacuation of the housemates to a nearby location in the Big Brother compound, due to severe flooding which caused leaks in the bedroom and living room from the roof. After several hours, the housemates returned to the house. For the remainder of Day 70 and the majority of Day 71, housemates only had access to the large task room (in the form of a makeshift bedroom), the garden, the garden toilet and small task room located off of this (formerly the mole hole, acting as a replacement small task room for the one located off the diary room) and the nest (in the form of a makeshift diary room). To prevent conversations in the nest ("diary room") with Big Brother from being overheard by other housemates, when a housemate wished to use the nest ("diary room"), the others had to move to the large task room ("bedroom").

At 8:33pm on Day 71, the housemates were allowed access to the whole house.

On Big Brother's Little Brother on Day 71, George Lamb interviewed the creative director of Big Brother, Phil Edgar-Jones. George asked what caused the leak, and Phil replied "Some of the housemates were throwing socks up onto the roof, the socks got stuck in the gutter and because of that the water couldn't drain, so it collected on the roof."Phil also highlighted the extent of the flooding by showing that approximately six inches of water had accumulated in the housemates' beds.

== Special features ==
=== Tree of Temptation ===
Located in the bathroom was a chest of drawers created from the Tree of Temptation that was present in the 2010 celebrity series. The Tree of Temptation gave housemates secret tasks to gain rewards for themselves or other housemates. The first task occurred on Day 1 when Mario was performing his "Impossible Task". This is the list of all tasks throughout the series:

Day	Recipient	Task	Reward	Result	Notes	Source
Day 1	Mario	To write fake messages from the outside world on to a beach ball and pretend that it had been thrown into the garden from over the wall.	Higher chances of passing his "Impossible Task".	Passed		
Day 2	Mario	To throw housemates' vegetables, fruit and bread into the whirlpool.	Higher chances of passing his "Impossible Task".	Passed		
Day 3	Mario	To destroy someone's cigarettes.	Higher chances of passing his "Impossible Task".	Passed		
Day 4	Mario	To install an earpiece on his outfit and listen to Tree's orders during the day (tasks included cheating in a quiz, and ruining refreshment and party food).	Higher chances of passing his "Impossible Task".	Passed		
Day 9	Corin	To tell each housemate a different outrageous lie about herself.	One housemate's suitcase. Corin chose Rachael's.	Passed	Although she told each housemate a different lie, the Tree was not satisfied that her lies were outrageous enough, and Corin was forced to tell one more lie to any housemate. She proceeded to tell Sunshine that she had missed her period and may be pregnant, and passed her task.	
Day 13	Shabby	To stay within touching distance of Ben, pay him 20 compliments and hug him for one minute.	A dinner date with the housemate of her choice. Shabby chose Caoimhe.	Passed	Despite Shabby passing the task, she told Caoimhe about the task and as punishment, Caoimhe was locked in the small task room, surrounded by pictures of Ben and Shabby, and had to listen to Ben and Shabby's conversations on a continuous loop.	
Day 22	Ben	To organise an impromptu arm-wrestling contest between all of the housemates and beat at least one of the girls.	The contents of everyone's suitcases.	Failed	On Day 24, Ben had to perform an improvised stand-up routine live on Channel 4, in front of the eviction crowd. In addition, on Day 25, he had a bad day set by the Tree of Temptation.	
Day 32	John James	To tell each of his fellow housemates an outrageous and jaw-dropping lie about Australia.	A Skype conversation with his friends and family.	Passed	John James did not do the task as planned, said some weak lies. However, the Tree of Temptation took into account that "John is dumb", and told him that he passed.	
Day 38	All housemates except Ben	To dress up as and act like Ben for 24 hours.	Ben's suitcase.	Passed		
Day 47	Andrew	To create 24 minutes of mayhem in the House, in the style of Jack Bauer from 24, via instructions given by the Tree through an earpiece.	Three bikini-clad young women fed Andrew oysters, chocolates, strawberries and champagne whilst music was played.	Passed		
Day 55	Dave	To make at least five other housemates yawn.	A message from his daughter.	Failed	Dave heard the message from his daughter, but read by the Tree of Temptation and played backwards.	
Day 58	JJ and Josie	To steal 5 props from the other housemates.	Double the week's shopping budget and a viewing of the housemates' Consider Yourself video.	Passed	The task was originally to be set for just JJ, who was portraying the Artful Dodger for that week's Dickens-themed task, but Josie walked in as the Tree was speaking to him and was consequently made JJ's partner.	
Day 63	Sam	To rub blue cheese under his armpits and pass it off as his own body odour.	Dave's letter from his daughter that he failed to earn on Day 55.	Passed	When no one commented on the cheese smell, Sam cut up garlic and rubbed it all over his body. The Tree of Temptation praised Sam for his quick thinking and shared that it considered him as an apprentice.	
Day 74	Andrew	To say "yes" to everything housemates asked him to do or asked him about himself.	A perfect day including breakfast in bed, a make-over, a hair cut and a party for all housemates.	Passed	The Tree of Temptation told the rest of the housemates, one by one, about this task so that they could have fun manipulating Andrew.	

=== Bob Righter ===
Bob Righter is a fortune teller machine that provided the housemates with (often cryptic) information on upcoming tasks and events. It is so named as it is an anagram of "Big Brother".

Day	Recipient	Token	Notes	Source
Day 10	Corin	Bob Righter's eyes shine a magic light, tomorrow for Corin is looking bright.	Corin received a "good day" from Big Brother after being chosen by Rachael during her eviction interview.	
Day 17	Josie	Bob Righter's eyes are full of fire, tomorrow for Josie her heart's desire.	Josie received a "good day" from Big Brother after being chosen by Govan during his eviction interview.	
Day 24	Ben	Ben's stand up challenge has come to end, too bad for him he revealed Bob Righter's friend. For tomorrow Ben will have a revelation and feel the wrath of the Tree of Temptation.	As Ben failed a Tree of Temptation task, he received a "bad day" from Big Brother.	
Day 31	All housemates	You've just witnessed Nathan's demise, now it's time to look to the skies.	Three new housemates (Andrew, Keeley and Rachel) entered the House, by landing in the garden in a 'spaceship', dressed as astronauts.	
Day 38	All housemates	My feathered friend listens to all that is said, she'll pipe up from wake up till time for your bed. But in between squawks, whistles and tweeting, which housemates' words has my bird been repeating? If you think that it's you put a coin in my slot, win a prize if you're right and nothing if you're not.	The first token arrived during the morning of the eviction day. Bob led the housemates to Davina McCaw to begin a task in which they had to recall who had said phrases repeated by the parrot. The later tokens for this task were given to housemates, along with a reward, if they had correctly identified who had said each phrase. Mario was rewarded with massage oil, Josie received chocolate, Rachel got sweets, Corin was given make up and nail varnish, Steve received Coco-pops, Ben was given a copy of some newspaper headlines from the last few weeks and Dave was rewarded with a photo of his wife.	
Day 38	Mario	Well done Mario, here's a gift for your toil. A bottle of sensual massage oil.		
Day 38	Josie	Well done Josie, that wasn't a shock. Here's bar after bar of your favourite choc.		
Day 38	Rachel	Well done Rachel, here’s your treat, Bob thinks you’ll find this really sweet.		
Day 38	Corin	Well done Corin, you are simply the best, pamper yourself rotten and get it all off your chest.		
Day 38	Steve	Well done Steve, you achieved your goal, here’s something tasty for your breakfast bowl.		
Day 38	Ben	Well done Ben, here’s news for you, read it out loud to the rest of your crew.		
Day 38	Dave	Well done Dave, way to go! A little gift for you, a nice photo.		
Day 38	All housemates	Bob has a treat to lift the gloom; Ben must go straight to the Diary Room.	The second token of the day arrived after the eviction. It instructed Ben to go to the Diary Room for a meal and to listen to music. This was a distraction so that the other housemates could begin a Tree of Temptation task.	
Day 70	All housemates	For 70 days I’ve been watching you closely, from Sam to Steve, John James to Josie. I’ve observed every movement, every task and eviction; now I’ve used all this knowledge to make a prediction. It tells of future events that involve all of you; to pass this task you must not let it come true. To beat my prediction, I suggest that you change your routine, from pretty to ugly, from polite to obscene. You should adjust your behaviour, act different and strange, because if you fail in this task, all you’ll get is small change. You’ve become so predictable, in your ways you are stuck, this isn’t going to be easy, but I wish you good luck! Remember housemates, Bob Righter is watching you.	This token marked the beginning of the Week 10 shopping task and was delivered in the morning of Day 70 after housemates had been shown a video of Bob Righter coming alive during the night. Whilst alive, Bob conspired with Davina McCall and the Tree of Temptation, then made a list of 15 predictions about the housemates. For housemates to pass the shopping task they had to prevent 8 or more of these predictions from coming true; they failed to do this.	

== Production ==
=== Auditions ===
Open auditions for the series took place in Manchester on 15–16 January 2010, in Dublin on 19 January 2010, in Cardiff on 23 January 2010, in Glasgow on 30 January 2010 and in London on 6–7 February 2010.

=== Pre-series ===
On 10 May, the Celebrity Big Brother 7 website was replaced with a Big Brother 11 mini-site updated with 23 pictures of Big Brother 11's new trailer. The trailer was aired on Channel 4 during The Million Pound Drop Live on 24 May. The trailer featured 30 ex-housemates from the past 10 series of Big Brother attending a funeral of the Diary Room Chair, with show narrator Marcus Bentley as the priest.

On 14 May, it was announced on the Big Brother mini-site that Emma Willis would be joining the current presenter of Big Brother's Little Brother, George Lamb, as co-host for the series. On 17 May, break bumpers featuring the falling flowers began showing on Channel 4. To celebrate the final series of Big Brother, Davina McCall hosted a special programme, Big Brother's Big Awards Show, where the British public has bestowed accolades upon memorable housemates from the previous series. This special was aired on E4 on 22 May. A further programme, Big Brother Exposed: The Inside Story, was aired on 28 May on E4, brought viewers highlights of the past ten series. On 21 May, Channel 4 unveiled the floral-themed eye logo for this summer's series of Big Brother.

=== Eye logo ===
The logo, which was made up of hundreds of vibrant flowers, and was a tribute to its past series since its debut in July 2000.

=== Title Sequence ===
The titles had a carnival theme which included spinning cogs, a gramophone which was exploding with flower petals, a ventriloquist dummy and a spinning Big Brother clock which was striking 11. There was also cutaway messages during the titles, spelling out 'Welcome' 'To The' 'Mad House'.

== The House ==
The first aerial pictures of the House were released by the Daily Star magazine as early as mid-May. On 5 June, pictures of the interior of the House were released. Rooms revealed were the entrance, living room, kitchen, bedroom, bathroom, and the garden.

The final Big Brother House was the most luxurious and open. The House was mainly walled with floral designs on glass, similar to series 7. The entrance had a theme of heaven, but had been revamped to one staircase rather than the previous two staircases. The diary room was tucked on the right hand side. Upon entering the living room, there was one large red sofa with a red/black theme. In contrast to the kitchen and bathroom's modern effect, the bedroom consisted of a Salvador Dalí design in the beds. The garden kept up a carnival theme, including a carousel. A snug was also built for the housemates to lounge and chat, and in addition, a mini pool/hot tub. On Day 70, the house was evacuated to a temporary location due to severe flooding in the living area and bedroom. The housemates returned later, and were limited to the task room to live.

== Ratings ==
These viewing figures are taken from BARB and include Channel 4 +1.

	Week 1		Week 2	Week 3	Week 4	Week 5	Week 6	Week 7	Week 8	Week 9	Week 10	Week 11
Saturday		2.31	2.57	1.97	2.1	2.18	1.98	2.06	2.07	1.95	1.93	2.21
Sunday		2.97	2.04	2.45	2.84	1.95	2.34	2.53	2.25	2.3	2.43	2.52
Monday		2.68	2.61	2.5	2.01	2.45	2.53	2.72	2.62	2.6	2.5	2.98
Tuesday		2.65	2.64	2.65	2.87	2.64	2.78	2.86	2.59	2.64	2.6	4.29
Wednesday	4.89	2.29	2.42	2.76	1.87	2.72	2.83	2.74	2.75	2.5	2.72	
Thursday	3.18	2.48	2.35	2.56	1.86	2.53	2.77	2.69	2.61	2.56	3.03	
Friday	2.51	3.01	2.43	2.47	2.73	2.85	2.57	2.86	2.69	2.76	3.3	
Friday	2.51	3.01	2.36	2.51	2.72	2.82	2.81	3.04	2.54	2.56	3.37	
Weekly average	2.9		2.43	2.48	2.38	2.52	2.58	2.69	2.52	2.48	2.74	3
Running average	2.9		2.69	2.63	2.57	2.56	2.56	2.58	2.57	2.51	2.58	2.6
Series average	2.6											
