= Ben Duncan (television personality) =

British socialite and television personality (1980–2025)

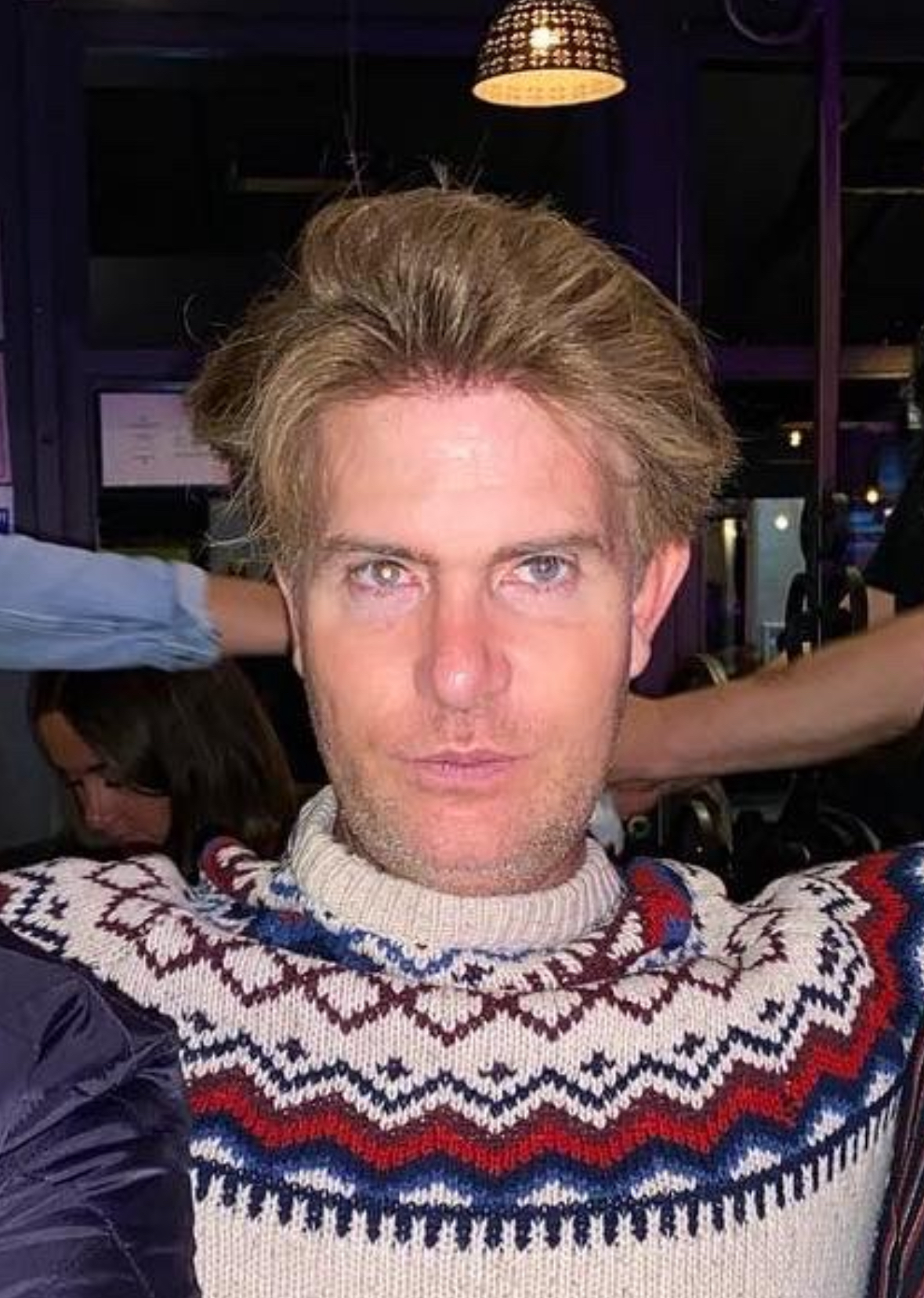
- Duncan in 2025
- Born: Benjamin Duncan; April 1980; London, England
- Died: 30 October 2025 (aged 45); London, England

Benjamin Duncan (April 1980 – 30 October 2025) was a British socialite and television personality known for being a contestant in the eleventh series of the Channel 4 reality television series Big Brother. Duncan also appeared on Celebrity Coach Trip, Come Dine with Me and ITV's Ladette to Lady. Duncan died on 30 October 2025.

== Early life ==
Benjamin Duncan was born in London, England, in April 1980. He attended the University of St Andrews in Scotland and was friends with Prince William and Kate Middleton.

== Big Brother ==
Duncan entered the Big Brother 11 house on Day 1, admitting in his profile that he "claims to not know a lot about Big Brother and hasn't told anyone he applied for fear of judgement from his friends and family". He survived eviction on Day 17, with Govan Hinds being evicted with 72.0% of the public vote. On Day 24, he performed a 90-second live stand up routine to an eviction crowd as a part of a task. On Day 48, Ben, Dave, John James, and Steve received the most nominations and were nominated for eviction. Ben, Dave, John James, and Steve competed in the "Battle of the Brides" task to determine who would save themselves from eviction. Steve won the competition and saved himself from eviction. He then nominated Andrew to take his place, meaning Andrew, Ben, Dave, and John James faced the public vote. He was evicted on Day 52, with 52.0% of the vote. He returned to the house, alongside Nathan and Rachael, as a part of a task on Day 71.

== Death ==
Duncan died on 30 October 2025 at the age of 45 after falling 100 ft (30 m) from the 7th floor of London's Trafalgar St. James Hotel. He was mourned by fellow Big Brother 11 housemate and winner Josie Gibson, Big Brother 11 housemate and finalist Mario Mugan, and Big Brother 7 runner-up Glyn Wise.
