= Celebrity Big Brother (British TV series) series 7 =

Coordinates: 51°39′23″N 0°16′02″W

Celebrity Big Brother
- Series 7
- Series seven logo
- Presented by: Davina McCall
- No. of days: 27
- No. of housemates: 12
- Winner: Alex Reid
- Runner-up: Dane Bowers
- Companion shows: Big Brother's Little Brother; Big Brother's Big Mouth; Big Brother Live
- No. of episodes: 32

Release
- Original network: Channel 4
- Original release: 3 January – 29 January 2010

Series chronology
- ← Previous; Series 6 Next → Series 8

Celebrity Big Brother 2010, also known as Celebrity Big Brother 7, is the seventh series of the British reality television series Celebrity Big Brother and the final series aired on Channel 4 and E4. It began on Sunday 3 January 2010 and aired for 27 days until the final on 29 January 2010, making it the longest Channel 4 series of Celebrity Big Brother. The series launched with 6.7 million viewers and became the most watched series of Big Brother UK since the eighth regular series in 2007, averaging 3.7 million viewers per night.

Davina McCall returned as main presenter, also hosting Big Brother's Big Mouth. George Lamb returned to present Big Brother's Little Brother. The show was sponsored by the bed retailer Dreams, who also sponsored the previous celebrity series.

Alex Reid won the show with 65.9% of the final vote, hence becoming the final Channel 4 Celebrity Big Brother winner. No housemates from this series appeared in Ultimate Big Brother later on in the year.

== Format ==
Celebrity Big Brother is a game show in which a group of celebrity contestants, referred to as housemates, live in isolation from the outside world in a custom built "house", constantly under video surveillance. During their time in the House, the housemates are required to nominate two of their fellow contestants for potential eviction, and the two or more with the most votes would be nominated. This process is mandatory for all housemates, and failure to comply could result in expulsion from the House. The public then vote, with one of those celebrities evicted from the house. When the final week arrives, the viewers vote for which of the remaining celebrities should win the series, and the housemate with the most votes becomes the winner.

During their time in the House, housemates are given weekly tasks to perform. The housemates wager a portion of their weekly shopping budget on the task, and either win double their wagered fund or lose the wagered fund depending on their performance in the task. The housemates are required to work as a group to complete their tasks, with the format of the tasks varying based on the number of remaining housemates. Throughout the series, some housemates have been given secret tasks that must either be completed individually or with a small group; failure to do so can result in the housemate being nominated or punished in the House. Should the housemates run out of the food provided for them, an emergency ration was available to them. The housemates are forbidden from discussing nominations, and doing so could result in punishment. The format of the series is mainly seen as a social experiment, and requires housemates to interact with others who may have differing ideals, beliefs, and prejudices. Housemates are also required to make visits to the Diary Room during their stay in the House, where they are able to share their thoughts and feelings on their fellow housemates and the game.

== Housemates ==
Celebrity	Age on entry	Notability	Day entered	Day exited	Result
Alex Reid	34	Mixed martial artist	1	27	Winner
Dane Bowers	30	Singer	1	27	Runner-up
Vinnie Jones	44	Actor and ex-footballer	1	27	3rd place
Jonas Altberg	25	Singer, record producer and DJ	1	27	4th place
Stephanie Beacham	62	Actress	1	27	5th place
Nicola Tappenden	27	Glamour model	1	25	Evicted
Ivana Trump	60	Former model and socialite	6	25	Evicted
Sisqó	31	Singer	1	20	Evicted
Stephen Baldwin	43	Actor	1	20	Evicted
Lady Sovereign	24	Rapper	1	16	Evicted
Heidi Fleiss	44	Former madam	1	13	Evicted
Katia Ivanova	21	Former girlfriend of Ronnie Wood	1	13	Evicted

=== Alex Reid ===
Alex Reid (born 21 July 1975) is an English professional mixed martial arts fighter, best known for being the then-boyfriend (now ex-husband) of Katie Price following her split from Peter Andre. He won the show on Day 27 with 65.9% of the public vote.

=== Dane Bowers ===
Dane Bowers (born 29 November 1979) is an English R&B singer, songwriter and record producer. Most famous for being one of the founder members of Another Level who had a UK number 1 single in 1998. He finished in second place.

=== Heidi Fleiss ===
Heidi Fleiss (born 30 December 1965) is an American "Hollywood Madam". Heidi was the second housemate to be evicted on Day 13 with 28.6% of the vote.

=== Ivana Trump ===
Ivana Trump (20 February 1949 — 14 July 2022) the former wife of Donald Trump, was a Czech-American fashion model and socialite. Ivana escaped the double eviction on Day 20 with only 21% of the total vote and was the only female housemate to survive a public vote against male housemates. On Day 25, she was evicted from the House as she had the fewest votes to win (5.74%).

=== Jonas Altberg ===
Jonas Altberg, better known as Basshunter (born 22 December 1984), is a Swedish record producer and singer-songwriter/DJ, active since 1998. He finished in fourth.

=== Katia Ivanova ===
Ekaterina "Katia" Ivanova (Russian: Екатерина "Катя" Иванова; born 13 August 1988) is a Kazakhstani-born Russian model known for being the ex-girlfriend of The Rolling Stones' Ronnie Wood. She was, with 44% of the vote, the first housemate to be evicted on Day 13.

=== Lady Sovereign ===
Lady Sovereign aka Sov (born 19 December 1985) is an English rapper and grime artist. She narrowly escaped the first eviction with only 27.4% of the total vote on Day 13 but she was evicted three days later with 69.5% of the vote.

=== Nicola Tappenden ===
Nicola Tappenden, also known as Nicola T (born 2 December 1982), is an English Page 3 Girl, and glamour model. She was evicted on Day 25. After her eviction, 'Nicola T' was replaced in the Big Brother House by Davina McCall, on the 25th Day as part of a twist.

=== Sisqó ===
Mark Althavean Andrews, known by his stage name Sisqó (born 9 November 1978), is an American R&B singer, best known for his hit single Thong Song in 2000. He was the fifth person to be evicted with 29% of the public vote on Day 20.

=== Stephanie Beacham ===
Stephanie Beacham (born 28 February 1947) is an English actress, best known for her role as Sable Colby in the ABC soap operas Dynasty and The Colbys. Stephanie left in fifth place in the final with 8.6% of the vote to win.

=== Stephen Baldwin ===
Stephen Baldwin (born 12 May 1966) is an American actor, the youngest of the Baldwin brothers. He was the fourth person to be evicted with 50% of the public vote on Day 20.

=== Vinnie Jones ===
Vinnie Jones (born 5 January 1965) is a British film actor and former footballer. He finished in third place.

== Nominations table ==
	Day 8	Day 14	Day 16	Day 27 Final		Nominations received
Alex	Heidi, Lady Sovereign	Lady Sovereign, Sisqó	Sisqó, Dane	Winner (Day 27)		4
Dane	Katia, Stephen	Lady Sovereign, Ivana	Ivana, Stephen	Runner-up (Day 27)		4
Vinnie	Heidi, Stephen	Alex, Nicola	Sisqó, Alex	Third place (Day 27)		0
Jonas	Heidi, Sisqó	Sisqó, Lady Sovereign	Ivana, Sisqó	Fourth place (Day 27)		5
Stephanie	Jonas, Katia	Lady Sovereign, Jonas	Stephen, Ivana	Fifth place (Day 27)		3
Nicola	Sisqó, Katia	Stephen, Lady Sovereign	Stephen, Ivana	Evicted (Day 25)		6
Ivana	Exempt	Jonas, Nicola	Jonas, Stephen	Evicted (Day 25)		8
Sisqó	Heidi, Dane	Ivana, Nicola	Ivana, Alex	Evicted (Day 20)		7
Stephen	Lady Sovereign, Jonas	Nicola, Dane	Nicola, Dane	Evicted (Day 20)		7
Lady Sovereign	Heidi, Alex	Ivana, Stephanie	Evicted (Day 16)			8
Heidi	Lady Sovereign, Stephanie	Evicted (Day 13)				5
Katia	Nicola, Stephanie	Evicted (Day 13)				3
Notes	1	none	2	3		
Against public vote	Heidi, Katia, Lady Sovereign	Lady Sovereign, Nicola	Ivana, Sisqó, Stephen	Alex, Dane, Ivana, Jonas, Nicola, Stephanie, Vinnie		
Evicted	Katia; 44% to evict	Lady Sovereign; 69.5% to evict	Stephen; 50% to evict	Ivana; 5.74% (out of 7)	Nicola; 6% (out of 7)	
Evicted	Katia; 44% to evict	Lady Sovereign; 69.5% to evict	Stephen; 50% to evict	Stephanie; 8.6% (out of 5)	Jonas; 12.8% (out of 5)	
Evicted	Heidi; 28.6% to evict	Lady Sovereign; 69.5% to evict	Sisqó; 29% to evict	Vinnie; 20.2% (out of 3)	Dane; 34.1% (out of 2)	
Evicted	Heidi; 28.6% to evict	Lady Sovereign; 69.5% to evict	Sisqó; 29% to evict	Alex; 65.9% to win		

Notes

- ^Note 1: As a new housemate, Ivana could not nominate or be nominated on Day 8.
- ^Note 2: Immediately following the eviction on Day 16, housemates were required to make their nominations live on Channel 4.
- ^Note 3: There were no nominations in the final week. Instead the public were voting for who they wanted to win. On Day 25, a vote count was taken and the two housemates with the fewest votes – Ivana and Nicola – were evicted. Any votes for the remaining housemates were carried to the final.

== Weekly summary ==
Day 1	Entrances	Stephen, Nicola, Alex, Stephanie, Lady Sovereign, Sisqó, Dane, Heidi, Jonas, Katia and Vinnie entered the house.
Day 1	Task	On launch night, housemates had five minutes to fit inside a Mini. Any housemate not inside the car was "warned". All housemates managed to fit inside, therefore, they all passed, winning themselves two bottles of champagne.
Day 2	Task	Housemates participated in a William Tell style shooting task to try to win bonus shopping items. Lady Sovereign, Vinnie, and Stephanie alternated being human targets, and the other housemates had to shoot paint-filled balloons at chosen food items on a platform above the target's head with a leg-operated slingshot. To win the food item, the shooter had to hit the board above the target's head or the food item itself. Housemates won milk, fresh cheese, mayonnaise, ketchup, salt, and fajitas.
Day 3	Events	Vinnie celebrated his 45th birthday inside the House.
Day 3	Task	Big Brother called Vinnie to answer a ringing telephone inside a booth that was placed in the garden. Housemates had to free him – as the door to the booth was locked – by performing a series of tasks. Each task completed would reveal one or more digits which was part of a code Vinnie had to relay over to Big Brother to 'learn his fate.' Housemates were unaware that if they passed the task, they would win Vinnie a surprise birthday party. Housemates passed the task, thereby winning Vinnie a birthday party.
Day 4	Task	The "Tree of Temptation" in the garden set Jonas a secret task to pour sand over another housemate's bed. If he did this without anyone else finding out, Big Brother would give Stephanie some Egyptian cotton bedsheets. Jonas failed the task as he told the other housemates about the task.
Day 4	Punishments	For failing the "Tree of Temptation's" task, Jonas had to choose another housemate to share a punishment with him. He chose Lady Sovereign and both were locked in the task room with Jonas's song "All I Ever Wanted" played in a loop.
Day 5	Task	The male housemates took part in the "Hunk-Off 2010", a contest involving an evening wear round, a swimwear round and a talent round. The female housemates gave each male points in every round. Sisqó won the task, Dane was second, Jonas was third, Alex finished fourth and Stephen was fifth. Vinnie hosted the contest.
Day 6	Entrances	Ivana entered the house.
Day 6	Task	On the live special, all housemates performed in their own variety show, with the surprise that a new housemate would enter at the end of the performance. Heidi, Jonas, Katia and Nicola wore frilly dresses for a can-can dance. Stephanie performed a lone stand up routine. Vinnie performed ventriloquism with the help of his dummy, Stephen. Alex and Dane performed the song, "Especially for You". And finally, Sisqó performed a Vegas style magic show with help from his assistant, Lady Sovereign. During Sisqó's act, Lady Sovereign disappeared (she was actually in the diary room), with Ivana taking her place. Lady Sovereign later reappeared saying that she had no idea Ivana was in the box with her.
Day 7	Task	The "Tree of Temptation" set Alex the task of kicking down the snowman in the garden – built by Jonas on Day 4 – kung fu style, in return, he was given his punchbag for one hour.
Day 8	Nominations	The housemates nominated for the first time. Heidi, Katia and Lady Sovereign received the most nominations and faced the public vote.
Day 8	Punishments	As Heidi and Stephen discussed nominations, Big Brother removed all of the food from the house and supplied housemates with chickpeas, lentils and rice.
Day 9	Task	For this week's shopping task, housemates had to run "Last Legs Retirement home" for two days. Stephanie and Ivana were carers to the rest of the housemates, who were old age pensioners. The OAPs had to eat liquidized food throughout the task and had to take part in an armchair aerobics session with Mr Motivator. For the first challenge, five residents of the home had to take part in a game of Countdown against the 2009 champion Chris Davies.
Day 10	Task	For the second challenge all the residents of the home completed a pensioner themed assault course – containing obstacles such riding a stairlift and finding a personalised bus pass in a tank of blue rinse – in a total time of under 30 minutes. In the final challenge of the task, residents had to complete a crossword with all the answers being words housemates have used to describe each other. The carers passed their part of the task, taking adequate care of the residents, but the residents failed the Countdown task and crossword task, which resulted in an overall fail and a basic shopping budget for the group.
Day 11	Task	Vinnie took part in a Mastermind-style quiz on the Big Brother Welcome Pack, which he had read at least twice every day during his stay in the house. For every question he answered correctly he would receive a special prize for each member of the group.
Day 13	Exits	Katia and Heidi were evicted from the house, receiving 44% and 28.6% of the public vote to evict, respectively.
Day 14	Nominations	The housemates nominated for the second time. Lady Sovereign and Nicola received the most nominations and faced the public vote.
Day 15	Tasks	Big Brother asked the most vocal housemate to come to the diary room. This housemate, Sisqó, was required to sing karaoke songs with missing words in them. For every song he gets completely correct he would receive a luxury prize. Six of the housemates were sat on a turntable with cold custard, cat food, liquid curry, fish guts and greasy gravy on another. If he got a lyric wrong, one housemate on the turntable would be sprayed with one of the items on the other turntable. Sisqó got two songs correct, winning luxury condiments and a mystery hamper, which contained a key.; Big Brother sent football manager Barry Fry into the House to give each housemate a half-time pep-talk.
Day 16	Task	On Day 16, Big Brother set the housemates a life drawing task. Two models, Ivana and Nicola, were given flesh-coloured underwear and had to pose for the rest of the housemates to draw them. For completing their part in the task, Ivana won ten steaks and Nicola won a photograph of her daughter. The housemate with the best drawing, Dane, won a cocktail.
Day 16	Exits	Lady Sovereign was evicted from the house, receiving 69.5% of the public vote to evict.
Day 16	Nominations	The housemates nominated for the third and final time. Ivana, Sisqó and Stephen received the most nominations and faced the public vote.
Day 17	Punishments	As the housemates allowed Lady Sovereign to leave the house with the key they won during a task, Big Brother swapped the sugar with the salt, turned the temperature in the bedroom to 27 °C, turned off the electrical appliances and hot water, and replaced the sofas in the living area and the snug with wooden benches; to make things worse, the benches in the snug were painted with honey. Later, Big Brother replaced the beds with uncomfortable ones.
Day 17	Tasks	The "Tree of Temptation" told Dane to make the housemates' dinner inedible by pouring extra-hot chili powder onto it. If he passed, he would receive a replacement key and the punishments would stop. However, the housemates enjoyed this addition to their meal, so he failed his task.; The Tree gave Dane a second chance to earn a replacement key by making him wait until every housemate was asleep before pretending to wake up as if he had just had a nightmare. If he woke up every housemate with his scream and made one of them give him a sympathetic hug, the punishments would stop. He passed this task.
Day 18	Task	The housemates were split into three teams, who were required to fit the offal of a cow into a wire mesh cow.
Day 19	Events	As holder of the mystery key, Dane earned a bottle of champagne and a slice of chocolate cake that he could enjoy in the Diary Room. He had to choose another housemate to enjoy some chocolate cake by slapping their bottom; he chose Stephanie. Dane was unaware, however, that Stephanie would not be eating the chocolate cake in the Diary Room, but would be covered in the cake that was released from a hatch above the Diary Room chair. Big Brother also scared the rest of the house into thinking they would also be drenched in cake.; Big Brother gave the housemates a party to celebrate Stephen's 21st year of sobriety.
Day 20	Task	Housemates were given a task of building a corner workstation with a chair using flat-pack furniture in 45 minutes. As Jonas was deemed to have an unfair advantage due to him being Swedish, he was given the task to sabotage the task. As housemates failed to build the workstation, Jonas passed the task and housemates were given a Swedish spa as a prize.
Day 20	Exits	Stephen and Sisqó were evicted from the house, receiving 50% and 29% of the public vote to evict, respectively.
Day 21	Tasks	The first task of the day was given to Nicola by the "Tree of Temptation". To receive a message from home, Nicola had to tell a home truth to each of her fellow housemates and give them a kiss. She passed this task after telling Ivana she looked like "a big, fat orange" (due to her tracksuit), telling Dane he looked like Danny DeVito, telling Jonas he looked like Roland Rat, telling Alex he had yellow teeth, telling Stephanie that she had "a big bush on her head" and telling Vinnie that he was getting fat.; Later in the day, housemates had to play a game of "Celebrity Hell Charades", where they had to mime infamous and embarrassing celebrity faux pas. They had one hour to mime 14 charades and for every correct mime they would receive an extra 5 minutes in bed in the morning. Housemates got them all correct in 13 minutes, meaning they received an extra 1 hour 10 minutes in bed the next morning.
Day 22	Events	Despite promising the housemates a lie-in of 1 hour and 10 minutes, Big Brother decided to break its promise, and played Rick Astley's Together Forever to wake them up.; For being the holder of the key, Dane was allowed to pick a housemate – he chose Jonas – to join him in entering a secret room containing a Nintendo Wii, pizza and other prizes.
Day 22	Task	On Day 22, Big Brother set housemates the task of staying chained together in groups of two or three. Vinnie & Ivana, Alex & Dane and Stephanie, Nicola & Jonas stayed chained together for 6 hours and 45 minutes.
Day 23	Task	Ivana was told she had been nominated for a magazine show 'Kugel Fresh'. However she did not know it was fake. The other housemates had to convince her it was real. Ivana won the fake award and the housemates had to spoil it for her by saying it was rubbish, at least three people had to drink out of it and at least one of them smash it. They achieved all three. For passing the task, they received an awards ceremony and a goody bag containing cosmetics and fake tan.
Day 24	Task	Housemates were set the task of creating a bust of Lionel Richie blindfolded and using clay. While they were blindfolded, a Richie lookalike entered the house. He judged all the models and before he left he chose Stephanie as the winner of the task. At the end of the task Big Brother told the housemates that Richie was in the room while they were blindfolded.
Day 25	Entrances	At 10.19pm Davina McCall entered the house in a chicken costume, pretending to be Nicola.
Day 25	Tasks	The "Tree of Temptation" set Vinnie the task of telling Alex he had cross dressed before and enjoyed it. Then, he had to tell the housemates over lunch how much he had bonded with them all with tears. He passed this task and, as a result, he was allowed to see the FA Cup Fourth round match between Tottenham Hotspur and Leeds United.; The next task required housemates to dress up as farm animals and make animal noises everywhere in the House except for a pen in the living area. This task allowed Davina to enter the House dressed as a chicken.
Day 25	Exits	Ivana was evicted from the house, receiving 5.74% of the public vote to win.; Nicola was secretly evicted via the Diary Room.
Day 27	Exits	Stephanie left the house in fifth place. Jonas left the house in fourth place, and Vinnie left the house in third place. It was then announced that Alex was the winner, leaving Dane as the runner-up.

== Production ==
On 13 December 2009, the first trailer was aired on Channel 4, during a screening of film Elf. A hell theme, similar to that of Big Brother 2004 and Big Brother 2008 was hinted with a tagline in the trailer that said: "Hell Lies in Others". Five days later on 18 December 2009, the first full 30-second long trailer was aired, with the eye present.

A Celebrity Big Brother 7 pre-series special show, Top 20 Celebrity Big Brother Moments, featured the series' most memorable moments of the show according to viewers who have voted online. The show aired on E4 on 28 December 2009. Within the special, the new graphics for the upcoming series were introduced.

Channel 4 has announced that it will resume its tradition of donating some of its income made from the premium-rate telephone lines; votes will be increased to 50p (an increase from 35p), with 15p going to Comic Relief and the donations from the phone votes from 16 January 2010 to the finale will go to support the relief efforts in Haiti following the recent earthquake.

=== Eye ===
The eye logo was revealed on 14 December 2009 on the Channel 4 website. It is the first time that the logo has been based on a real eye since series one in 2000. It is also the first time ever that the Celebrity Big Brother eye was not based on the eye from the summer series before it.

=== House ===
Official images of the House's entrance, living area, kitchen, and the bathroom were released on the show's website on 29 December 2009. This was the first time that a brand new house was used for a celebrity series. Usually, Celebrity Big Brother uses the same house as the summer series which preceded it. The main entrance has red paint covering the walls, with black carpet covering the floor. The entrance to the diary room resembles a fiery inferno. Going inside the main House, a luxurious red carpet covers the whole room, with black and gold walls. Gilded panels were a new installment in the ceiling. A brand new velvet seating area and dining table finished the whole area. The kitchen was also given a big makeover, similar to a restaurant kitchen, but reportedly based upon an autopsy laboratory. The bathroom's colours for this series varies a little from the "hell" theme given, as the colours in the room are a cream blue. As well, a snug was installed in the garden, complete with two couches, throws, and a fireplace. Also installed in the garden was a tree known as the Tree of Temptation, who would give housemates secret tasks to complete to get a luxury prize. Executive producer Shirley Jones stated that the house was heavily based on Dante's Inferno and the quote "Abandon hope all ye who enter here." She has also stated as well that the house was influenced by the quote "Hell is other people" by Jean-Paul Sartre; the house lacks any private quarters for the housemates to be in solitude.

== Ratings ==
Ratings are provided by BARB.

	Official viewers (millions)			
	Week 1	Week 2	Week 3	Week 4
Saturday		2.87	2.61	2.39
Sunday	6.28	2.96	2.79	2.37
Monday	3.77	3.3	2.35	2.8
Monday	3.77	3.3	3.17	2.8
Tuesday	3.33	3.1	3.22	3.23
Wednesday	3.46	3.14	2.98	3.61
Wednesday	3.46	3.14	2.98	3.31
Thursday	3.36	3.52	3.16	3.49
Friday	3.35	3.66	3.49	3.89
Friday	3.9	3.54	3.33	4.46
Weekly average	3.92	3.26	3.01	3.28
Running average	3.91	3.57	3.36	3.34
Series average	3.34			
blue-coloured boxes denote live shows.

== Controversy ==
=== Boy George legal exclusion ===
Originally intended by the producers as one of the housemates, Boy George (George Alan O'Dowd) had his request to appear on the final series of Celebrity Big Brother turned down by the Probation Service. O'Dowd was convicted in January 2009 for false imprisonment after he handcuffed a Norwegian man to a wall in his east London home. He was sentenced to 15 months imprisonment. Released from prison in May 2009 on licence from Her Majesty's Prison Service, various conditions were applied to his licence conditions, which terminated in April 2010. O'Dowd applied to the High Court for judicial review of the National Probation Service's decision to refuse his request to reside in the Big Brother house and not to report to his probation officer during his time in the house (or alternatively for the probation officer to meet him in the Big Brother house). Richard Clayton QC, representing the Probation Service, said O'Dowd's participation would pose "a high level of risk" to the service's reputation. Mr Clayton argued that if he used the show to promote his status as a celebrity and earn "a lucrative sum of money" it could undermine public confidence in the criminal justice system. The judge accepted that the Probation Service's decision was not unreasonable, meaning that O'Dowd could not appear.

=== Ableism ===
During 29 January broadcast of Big Brother's Big Mouth, Vinnie Jones accused Davina McCall of 'walking like a retard', McCall responded by laughing and Jones then mimed what he meant. Despite immediate protests by disability charities, individual disabled people and a Facebook campaign, Channel 4 initially responded "It is important that within the context and structure of the programme that participants have the right to express themselves without censure". It was not until 12 February that Channel 4 removed the incident from its on-demand service 4oD and issued an apology, blaming the failure on the 'tiredness' of production staff. Jones and McCall issued apologies via their respective publicists at around the same time. The tardiness of the response drew unfavourable comment from disability groups, particularly following Channel 4's action in the Celebrity Big Brother 5 racism incident, where contestants were warned over their conduct.

=== Kerry Katona's planned participation ===
Atomic Kitten member and television personality Kerry Katona was asked to appear in the series and accepted the offer. Katona was reportedly expected to be paid £250,000 to appear on the show and was hoping to use the money to get her out of financial troubles and use the appearance to relaunch her career and public image after years of negative media coverage. However, Katona failed the psychiatric assessments that all potential participants have to go through to ensure they can cope with confinement in the house. The reason for her failure of the tests was down to her bipolar disorder, with the psychiatrists deeming her "unfit" to enter the house.

Katona finally entered the Big Brother House on 18 August 2011 for Channel 5's first series of Celebrity Big Brother.
