= Nadia Almada =

Portuguese-born English television personality

Nádia Almada
- Born: 28 January 1977 (age 49); Ribeira Brava, Madeira, Portugal
- Occupations: Reality TV star, media personality, singer
- Years active: 2004–present
- Television: Big Brother 5 Ultimate Big Brother

Nádia Conceição Almada (born 28 January 1977) is a Portuguese-born English reality television star and media personality. She is best known for winning the fifth series of Big Brother UK, being the first transgender contestant to do so.

== Big Brother ==
In 2004, Almada entered the fifth series of Big Brother UK which she eventually won, securing 74% of the public vote, winning £63,500. Almada was the first transgender housemate in Big Brother UK history and the first to win the show. She kept her transgender identity a secret from her fellow housemates, but the public viewers were aware. During her time in the Big Brother house, she was a member of a clique who referred to themselves as the "Lip Gloss Bitches" alongside Emma Greenwood, Marco Sabba and Michelle Bass. Her victory was shown as a plot point in episode 7 of the 2025 drama What It Feels Like for a Girl.

On Day 15, housemates Michelle Bass and Emma Greenwood were voted by the public to enter Big Brother's Bed Sit, a part of a fake eviction. Both housemates were given 24/7 streaming access to their fellow housemates who believed they had been evicted, and they were able to observe the housemates and play pranks on them. Some of the housemates under the impression Bass and Greenwood had been evicted began speaking poorly of them. On Day 20, Bass and Greenwood returned to the official Big Brother house, and upon their return housemates were given fancy dress costumes and alcohol to celebrate. In the early hours of their return night, some of the housemates engaged in a playful food fight leaving the communal living area in a mess. When housemate Jason Cowan insisted they tidy up the mess, housemate Marco Sabba refused, prompting a heated argument between the pair, leading to Almada flipping a table and slapping Cowan across the face. The argument escalated with Greenwood and housemate Victor Ebuwa squaring up to each other and throwing food at each other, with Greenwood eventually throwing an empty tray at him and causing a physical altercation after Ebuwa retaliated the same way. Greenwood was escorted out the Big Brother house by Big Brother security guards, and was removed from the house by producers. The incident was livestreamed by Channel 4, causing viewers to call the police, Ofcom also received over 1,000 complaints due to the incident, Channel 4 and Endemol also had to release official statements following the fight.

In 2010, Almada entered the Ultimate Big Brother house. She was evicted on Day 11 in a double eviction alongside Big Brother series 6 housemate Makosi Musambasi, placing tenth overall. She feuded with Celebrity Big Brother series 6 housemate Coolio, who was ejected after a heated argument with Almada on Day 5.

In 2005, she entered the Big Brother Australia house visiting the finalists. She also made a guest appearance on the Big Brother UK series 9 launch night.

== Other work ==
After her appearance on Big Brother UK, she went on to record a single entitled A Little Bit of Action, which reached Number 27 in the UK Singles Chart in December 2004. She also made a cameo appearance in the soap opera Hollyoaks.

Almada was also a contestant on the Channel 5 reality series Trust Me... I'm a Holiday Rep, replacing Make Me a Supermodel contestant Jasmine Lennard. The following year, she was a guest on the Channel 4 reality series, Fool Around With..., deciphering who out of several male contestants was single, enabling them to win a £10,000 cash prize. She went on to appear on multiple other television series including; 8 out of 10 Cats, Ant & Dec's Saturday Night Takeaway, Come Dine with Me, The Weakest Link and many others.

She took part in Celebrity Fitness Videos Not Fit for TV, hosted by Eamonn Holmes and Lorraine Kelly. The show featured celebrities performing Almada's own Latino inspired dance video, Latino Dance Workout, which she released in 2004.

== Personal life ==
Almada is from Ribeira Brava, on the Portuguese island of Madeira. She lived in Woking around the time Big Brother was filmed.

In a 2009 interview with Heat magazine, she revealed that she is writing her memoirs.

== Filmography ==
Film and television
Year	Title	Role	Notes
2004	Big Brother UK series 5	Self; housemate	Winner, 82 episodes
2004	Big Brother Uncut	Self; housemate	19 episodes
2004	GMTV	Self; guest	1 episode
2004	Loose Women	Self; guest	2 episodes
2004	Kelly	Self; guest	1 episode
2004	Ant & Dec's Saturday Night Takeaway	Self; guest	1 episode
2004	The Paul O'Grady Show	Self; guest	1 episode
2004	Mr. Gay UK	Self; judge	TV special
2004	Ministry of Mayhem	Self; guest	1 episode
2004	The Weakest Link	Self; contestant	1 episode
2004	The Big Fat Quiz of the Year	Self; contestant	1 episode
2004	Latino Dance Workout with Nadia	Self	Fitness DVD
2004	Hollyoaks	Self; cameo	1 episode
2005	This Morning	Self; guest	1 episode
2005	Trust Me... I'm a Holiday Rep	Self; contestant	1 episode
2005	Dirty Tricks	Self; guest	1 episode
2005	Richard & Judy	Self; guest	1 episode
2005	8 out of 10 Cats	Self; guest	1 episode
2005	Big Brother Australia series 5	Self; Big Brother UK winner	1 episode
2005	The Charlotte Church Show	Self; guest	1 episode
2005	The Friday Night Project	Self; guest	3 episodes
2006	Fool Around with...	Self; cast member	4 episodes
2006	Big Brother's Little Brother	Self; ex-housemate	2 episodes
2008	Big Brother UK series 9	Self; ex-housemate	1 episode
2010	Big Brother's Big Awards Show	Self; ex-housemate	TV special
2010	The 5 O'Clock Show	Self; guest	1 episode
2010	Come Dine with Me	Self; contestant	1 episode
2010	The 50 Funniest Moments of 2010	Self; commentator	TV special
2011	Ultimate Big Brother	Self; housemate	10th place, 15 episodes
2025	What It Feels Like For A Girl	Self; cameo	1 episode

== Singles ==
List of singles, with selected chart positions
Title	Year	Peak chart positions	Album
Title	Year	UK	Album
"A Little Bit of Action"	2004	27	Single
