= The Charlotte Church Show =

Television series

- Presented by: Charlotte Church
- Country of origin: United Kingdom
- No. of series: 3
- No. of episodes: 25

Production
- Production location: The London Studios
- Running time: 50 mins
- Production companies: Monkey Kingdom; Chickflicks Productions

Original release
- Network: Channel 4
- Release: 1 September 2006 – 21 December 2008

The Charlotte Church Show is a Channel 4 entertainment television show presented by Welsh singer Charlotte Church. It was first broadcast on 1 September 2006 and ran for six subsequent Fridays. The show was commissioned for a further two series, the first of which aired from 23 February to 6 April 2007. On 13 December 2006, Church won the Best Female Newcomer award for the show at the British Comedy Awards.

Each episode begins with a "theme tune" which always has the same melody and harmony, but is always in a unique style (reggae, country, disco, etc.). In the verse, Church sings about current events and gossip, and the chorus is simply "This is my lovely theme tune, it goes on and on."

== Episode guide ==
Note: All guests not involved in a sketch or a hidden camera trick, are indicated in bold. (i.e. The guests mentioned during the opening credits)

=== Series 1 ===
| Date | Episode number | Guests | Music and guest performer | Viewers (millions) |
|---|---|---|---|---|
| July 2006 (unaired) | Pilot | Sally Lindsay, Fern Britton, Trisha Goddard, John Altman, Davina McCall, Eamonn Holmes | none | |
| 1 September 2006 | 1 | Eric McCormack, Michael McIntyre, Denise Van Outen, Richard Newman | Charlotte accompanied The Feeling singing their single "Never Be Lonely" | 2.26 |
| 8 September 2006 | 2 | Patsy Kensit, Ruby Wax | Charlotte accompanied Orson singing their single "No Tomorrow" | 1.85 |
| 15 September 2006 | 3 | Johnny Vegas, Will Smith | Charlotte sang "Crazy" by Gnarls Barkley with Nelly Furtado | 1.88 |
| 22 September 2006 | 4 | Ashlee Simpson, Adam Hills, Danny Dyer, Paul Danan | Charlotte sang "Seven Nation Army" by The White Stripes with The Brand New Heavies | Unknown |
| 29 September 2006 | 5 | Alan Cumming, Jessica Stevenson, David Smallbone | Charlotte sang "Message in a Bottle" by The Police with Nerina Pallot | Unknown |
| 6 October 2006 | 6 | Rupert Everett, Justin Moorhouse, Liza Minnelli | Charlotte sang "Somebody Told Me" by The Killers with Alesha Dixon | Unknown |
| 13 October 2006 | 7 | Keith Allen, Rhod Gilbert, Kerry Katona | Charlotte sang "Beat It" by Michael Jackson with Amy Winehouse | Unknown |
| 22 December 2006 | Christmas Special | Ben Elton, Paul O'Grady | Charlotte sang "White Christmas" with the Sugababes | Unknown |

=== Series 2 ===
Series 2 started on 23 February 2007 at 10pm on Channel 4 and lasted for 6 episodes. The second series had many changes compared to the first series, with a new theme tune, losing sketches such as "What We've Learnt This Week" and a much classier studio and sound.

| Date | Episode number | Guests | Music and guest performer | Viewers (millions) |
|---|---|---|---|---|
| 23 February 2007 | 1 | Billie Piper, Gwen Stefani | Charlotte sang "Rocks" by Primal Scream with McFly | 2.32 |
| 2 March 2007 | 2 | Davina McCall, Noel Fielding, Craig Phillips, Sophie Pritchard, Nush Nowak, Jon Tickle, Nadia Almada, Michelle Bass, Eugene Sully, Kemal Shahin, Kinga Karolczak, Sam Heuston, Aisleyne Horgan-Wallace, Susie Verrico | Charlotte sang "Don't Let Go (Love)" by En Vogue with Lucie Silvas | 2.51 |
| 9 March 2007 | 3 | Hilary Duff, Chris Moyles | Charlotte sang "You Got The Love" by Candi Staton with Jamelia. | 2.26 |
| 23 March 2007 | 4 | Avril Lavigne, Lorraine Kelly, Carmen Electra | Charlotte sang "When Doves Cry" by Prince with Patrick Wolf. | 2.08 |
| 30 March 2007 | 5 | John Barrowman, Danny Dyer | Charlotte accompanied the Manic Street Preachers singing their single "Your Love Alone Is Not Enough" | 1.82 |
| 6 April 2007 | 6 | Katie Price, Nicholas Hoult | Charlotte sang "9 to 5" by Dolly Parton, with Fergie | 1.81 |

=== Series 3 ===
On 23 March 2007 a message was posted on the official Charlotte Church website to say that the series planned for summer 2007 has been put on hold until Church is ready to return to work after her pregnancy. In response to the delay of the third series Channel 4 doubled the number of episodes for the fifth series of The Friday Night Project.

It was announced on 10 February 2008 that Charlotte was ready to make her return to TV. Church herself confirmed on 26 March 2008 that the show would be back with the same format in summer 2008 as well as a Christmas special.

The series was moved to Thursday nights instead of Friday nights and began on 10 July 2008 with 2.4m viewers, matching the viewership that tuned in to the first episode of the second series.

| Date | Episode number | Guests | Music and guest performer | Viewers (millions) |
|---|---|---|---|---|
| 10 July 2008 | 1 | Catherine Tate, Lee Mack, Chris Fountain | Charlotte sang "We Can Work It Out" by The Beatles with Beverley Knight | 2.22 |
| 17 July 2008 | 2 | Katie Price, Gok Wan, Shane Lynch | Charlotte sang "Will You Still Love Me Tomorrow?" by The Shirelles with Martha Wainwright | 2.06 |
| 24 July 2008 | 3 | Jonathan Ross, Kevin Bishop | Charlotte sang "Son of a Preacher Man" by Dusty Springfield with Sharleen Spiteri | 1.95 |
| 31 July 2008 | 4 | Chris Addison, Jason Donovan | Charlotte sang "Be My Baby" by The Ronettes with Solange Knowles | 1.48 |
| 7 August 2008 | 5 | Jimmy Carr, Alan Davies | Charlotte sang "Losing My Religion" by R.E.M. with The Script | 1.53 |
| 14 August 2008 | 6 | Ricky Hatton, Frankie Boyle | Charlotte sang "I'd Rather Go Blind" by Etta James with Beth Rowley | Unknown |
| 21 August 2008 | 7 | Patsy Palmer, Adam Hills | Charlotte sang "Black and Gold" by Sam Sparro with Alphabeat | 1.30 |
| 28 August 2008 | 8 | Michael McIntyre, Trinny and Susannah, Rebecca Adlington | Charlotte and Josh Groban performed their duet "The Prayer" | Unknown |
| 21 December 2008 | Christmas Special | James Corden, Ruth Jones, Ronnie Corbett, Jo Brand | Charlotte sang "Have Yourself a Merry Little Christmas" with Rhydian Roberts. | Unknown |

=== Series 4 ===
Church stated on The Paul O'Grady Show that there would be a Series 4, containing more music and entertainment as opposed to interviews. In 2010, she announced she would not return to the show, saying she did not enjoy the presenting side of it.
