= Michelle Bass =

Model and broadcaster

- Born: 2 February 1981 (age 45); Newcastle, England
- Occupations: Reality television star; media personality; model; columnist
- Years active: 2004–present
- Television: Big Brother 5 Ultimate Big Brother
- Spouse: Steve McKeown (m. 2010)
- Partner: Stuart Wilson (2004–2007)

Michelle Bass (born 2 February 1981) is an English reality television star, columnist, model and media personality. She is best known for her appearance on the fifth series of Big Brother UK.

== Early life ==
Born in Newcastle upon Tyne, Bass attended Gosforth High School. Before appearing on Big Brother, she worked in a call centre and had auditioned for Pop Idol.

== Big Brother ==
In 2004, Bass entered the fifth series of Big Brother UK. She entered the house on Day 1, being evicted on Day 64, placing sixth overall. During her time in the Big Brother house, she was a member of a clique who referred to themselves as the "Lip Gloss Bitches" alongside; Emma Greenwood, Marco Sabba and eventual winner, Nadia Almada. She notoriously feuded with fellow housemate Ahmed Aghil and formed a relationship with fellow Stuart Wilson, where they infamously had sex in the kitchen of the house, their relationship received a large amount of media coverage during and after the show, the pair dated until 2007.

On Day 15, Bass and fellow housemate Emma Greenwood were voted by the public to enter Big Brother's Bed Sit, a part of a fake eviction. Both housemates were given 24/7 streaming access to their fellow housemates who believed they had been evicted, they were able to observe the housemates and play pranks on them. Despite this, some of the housemates under the impression Bass and Greenwood had been evicted, began speaking poorly of them. On Day 20, Bass and Greenwood returned to the official Big Brother house, upon their return housemates were given fancy dress costumes and alcohol to celebrate. In the early hours of their return night, some of the housemates engaged in a playful food fight leaving the communal living area in a mess, when housemate Jason Cowan insisted they tidy up the mess, housemate Marco Sabba refused prompting a heated argument between the pair. The argument escalated with Greenwood and housemate Victor Ebuwa squaring up to each other and throwing food at each other, with Greenwood eventually throwing an empty tray at him, causing a physical altercation after Ebuwa retaliated the same way. Greenwood was escorted out the Big Brother house by Big Brother security guards, and was removed from the house by producers. The incident was livestreamed by Channel 4, causing viewers to call the police, Ofcom also received over 1,000 complaints due to the incident, Channel 4 and Endemol also had to release official statements following the fight.

In 2009, Bass returned as a guest in the tenth series of Big Brother UK, a part of the Big Brother UK tenth anniversary celebrations.

In 2010, Bass entered the Ultimate Big Brother house as a late entrant, entering on Day 4, alongside ex-fellow housemate Victor Ebuwa. She was evicted on Day 16, the semi-final, placing ninth overall.

== Other work ==
After her appearance on Big Brother, Bass went on to appear on multiple television shows, including; 8 out of 10 Cats, The Charlotte Church Show, The Culture Show and The Weakest Link. In 2004, Bass played Princess Jasmine, in the Aladdin pantomime at Alban Arena in St Albans. She made a cameo appearance as herself in The Story of Tracy Beaker, She also had a brief appearance in the 2007, film I Want Candy. In 2014, she had a minor role in the film The Salvation.

Bass began working as a columnist, contributing Big Brother columns for OK! magazine and News of the World, from 2007 to 2009. She was also The People's official Big Brother series 8, columnist.

She began glamour modelling after appearing on Big Brother, including posing topless for Nuts and appearing in Zoo. In 2007, she began working as a model for the online clothing store Discoo.

== Personal life ==
In 2010, Bass married hypnotist Steve McKeown; they have a daughter who was born in 2013.

== Filmography ==
Film and television
Year	Title	Role	Notes
2004	Big Brother UK series 5	Self; housemate	6th place, 76 episodes
2004	GMTV	Self; guest	1 episode
2004	The Weakest Link	Self; contestant	1 episode
2004	The Culture Show	Self; guest	1 episode
2004	The Story of Tracy Beaker	Self; cameo	1 episode
2005	8 out of 10 Cats	Self; guest	1 episode
2005	Bed & Bardsleys	Self; guest	1 episode
2005	Big Brother's Most Outrageous Moments	Self; ex-housemate	TV special
2007	The Charlotte Church Show	Self; guest	1 episode
2007	I Want Candy	Pornstar	
2009	Big Brother UK series 10	Self; ex-housemate	1 episode
2009	Big Brother: A Decade in the Headlines	Self; ex-housemate	Documentary
2010	Big Brother's Little Brother	Self; ex-housemate	1 episode
2010	Most Shocking Celebrity Moments 2010	Self; commentator	TV special
2011	Ultimate Big Brother	Self; housemate	9th place, 14 episodes
2011	Celebrity Juice	Self; guest	1 episode
2012	Big Brother's Bit on the Side	Self; ex-housemate	3 episodes
2014	The Salvation	Insurance Broker	
