= Ultimate Big Brother =

- Logo for Ultimate Big Brother
- Presented by: Davina McCall
- No. of days: 18
- No. of housemates: 14
- Winner: Brian Dowling
- Runner-up: Nikki Grahame
- Companion shows: Big Brother's Little Brother; Big Brother's Big Mouth; Big Brother Live
- No. of episodes: 22

Release
- Original network: Channel 4
- Original release: 24 August – 10 September 2010

Ultimate Big Brother is an All-Star edition of the Big Brother series featuring memorable housemates from previous series of Big Brother, and Celebrity Big Brother. A 24-hour live streaming service was also available via the Big Brother website as a fee-based service. The series ended with Brian Dowling winning the title of the "Ultimate Housemate" and the words "Big Brother will get back to you".

Ultimate Big Brother was the final series of the British reality television programme Big Brother to air on Channel 4. The series was produced by Remarkable Pictures, a division of Endemol.

== Housemates ==
On Day 1, following the Big Brother 11 final, 11 former housemates entered the Ultimate Big Brother House. Josie Gibson, as the winner of Big Brother 11 returned to the house after being crowned a winner. She was then joined by 5 more housemates from regular civilian Big Brother series and 5 housemates from Celebrity Big Brother series. On Day 4, two new housemates (Michelle and Victor) entered the bedsit. They were both allowed full access to the House on Day 6. A third new housemate (Vanessa) entered the House on Day 11.

| Name | Previous status | | Age on entry | Hometown | Day entered | Day exited | Result |
| Name | Series | Result | Age on entry | Hometown | Day entered | Day exited | Result |
|---|---|---|---|---|---|---|---|
| Brian Dowling | Big Brother 2 | Winner | 32 | Rathangan, County Kildare, Ireland | 1 | 18 | Winner |
| Nikki Grahame | Big Brother 7 | 5th place | 28 | Watford, Hertfordshire | 1 | 18 | Runner-up |
| Chantelle Houghton | Celebrity Big Brother 4 | Winner | 27 | London | 1 | 18 | 3rd place |
| Victor Ebuwa | Big Brother 5 | Evicted | 29 | London | 4 | 18 | 4th place |
| Nick Bateman | Big Brother 1 | Ejected | 42 | London | 1 | 18 | 5th place |
| Preston | Celebrity Big Brother 4 | 4th place | 28 | Worthing, West Sussex | 1 | 18 | 6th place |
| Ulrika Jonsson | Celebrity Big Brother 6 | Winner | 43 | Cookham Dean, Berkshire | 1 | 18 | 7th place |
| Vanessa Feltz | Celebrity Big Brother 1 | Evicted | 48 | London | 11 | 16 | Evicted |
| Michelle Bass | Big Brother 5 | Evicted | 29 | Newcastle upon Tyne | 4 | 16 | Evicted |
| Nádia Almada | Big Brother 5 | Winner | 33 | Woking, Surrey | 1 | 11 | Evicted |
| Makosi Musambasi | Big Brother 6 | 3rd place | 29 | Aylesbury, Buckinghamshire | 1 | 11 | Evicted |
| Coolio | Celebrity Big Brother 6 | 3rd place | 47 | Monessen, Pennsylvania | 1 | 5 | Ejected |
| John McCririck | Celebrity Big Brother 3 | Evicted | 70 | Surbiton, London | 1 | 4 | Evicted |
| Josie Gibson | Big Brother 11 | Winner | 25 | Bristol | 1 | 3 | Walked |

== House guests ==
Throughout the series, ex-housemates from previous series of former Big Brother housemates and presenters entered the Ultimate Big Brother House as part of tasks or have been involved in the series for other reasons.

| Name | Previous status | | Day | Reason |
| Name | Series | Status | Day | Reason |
|---|---|---|---|---|
| Caroline O'Shea | Big Brother 1 | Evicted | Day 2 | Took part in the "Who Is She?" shopping task |
| Kathreya Kasisopa | Big Brother 9 | Evicted | Day 2 | Took part in the "Who Is She?" shopping task |
| Grace Adams-Short | Big Brother 7 | Evicted | Day 2 | Took part in the "Who Is She?" shopping task |
| Amma Antwi-Agyei | Big Brother 2 | Evicted | Day 2 | Took part in the "Who Is She?" shopping task |
| Anna Nolan | Big Brother 1 | Runner-up | Day 2 | Took part in the "Who Is She?" shopping task |
| Lisa Jeynes | Big Brother 4 | Evicted | Day 2 | Took part in the "Who Is She?" shopping task |
| Darren Ramsay | Big Brother 1 | Third Place | Day 3 | Announced the results of Day 3's nominations |
| John James Parton | Big Brother 11 | Evicted | Day 3 | Recorded a message for Josie. However, she walked before receiving it |
| Stuart Pilkington | Big Brother 9 | Evicted | Day 5 | Chosen by Michelle and Victor to be Nadia's slave for an hour |
| Craig Phillips | Big Brother 1 | Winner | Day 7 | Competed against the housemates in the "Team Building" task |
| Ahmed Aghil | Big Brother 5 | Evicted | Day 9 | Recreated his plate smashing incident from Big Brother 5 |
| Anthony Hutton | Big Brother 6 | Winner | Day 10 | To have a date with Makosi |
| Marco Sabba | Big Brother 5 | Evicted | Day 10 | Took part in Brian's "Bubble, Hold Me" task |
| Amanda Marchant | Big Brother 8 | Runner-up | Day 10 | Took part in Brian's "Bubble, Hold Me" task |
| Sam Marchant | Big Brother 8 | Runner-up | Day 10 | Took part in Brian's "Bubble, Hold Me" task |
| Glyn Wise | Big Brother 7 | Runner-up | Day 10 | Took part in Brian's "Bubble, Hold Me" task |
| Pete Bennett | Big Brother 7 | Winner | Day 11 | Took part in Nikki's "PA" task |
| Rex Newmark | Big Brother 9 | Fourth Place | Day 12 | Took part in the "Enjoy the Silence" task |
| Jon Tickle | Big Brother 4 | Evicted | Day 12 | Took part in Michelle's part of the "Enjoy the Silence" task |
| Davina McCall | Big Brother presenter 2000-2010 | | Day 16 | To complete the Tree of Temptation's "Letters from Home" task |
| Marcus Bentley | Big Brother narrator 2000-present | | Day 17 | Took part in the "Big Brother's Funeral" task |
| George Lamb | Big Brother's Little Brother presenters | | Day 18 | Presented the final Big Brother's Little Brother from inside the House |
| Emma Willis | Big Brother's Little Brother presenters | | Day 18 | Presented the final Big Brother's Little Brother from inside the House |

== Nominations table ==
| | Day 3 | Day 7 | Day 13 | Day 18 Final | | Nominations received |
|---|---|---|---|---|---|---|
| Brian | John, Coolio | Makosi, Nick | Nick, Preston | Winner (Day 18) | | 4 |
| Nikki | Coolio, John | Chantelle, Nick | Ulrika, Michelle | Runner-up (Day 18) | | 4 |
| Chantelle | John, Ulrika | Nádia, Nikki | Nick, Nikki | Third place (Day 18) | | 4 |
| Victor | Not in House | Exempt | Brian, Chantelle | Fourth place (Day 18) | | 0 |
| Nick | John, Makosi | Makosi, Nádia | Ulrika, Vanessa | Fifth place (Day 18) | | 8 |
| Preston | John, Makosi | Ulrika, Makosi | Vanessa, Michelle | Sixth place (Day 18) | | 1 |
| Ulrika | John, Nick | Nick, Nikki | Michelle, Nikki | Seventh place (Day 18) | | 5 |
| Vanessa | Not in House | | Brian, Chantelle | Evicted (Day 16) | | 3 |
| Michelle | Not in House | Exempt | Nick, Vanessa | Evicted (Day 16) | | 3 |
| Nádia | John, Coolio | Chantelle, Nick | Evicted (Day 11) | | | 4 |
| Makosi | Nádia, John | Brian, Ulrika | Evicted (Day 11) | | | 5 |
| Coolio | John, Nádia | Ejected (Day 5) | | | | 4 |
| John | ~~Josie~~, Coolio, Brian | Evicted (Day 4) | | | | 9 |
| Josie | Walked (Day 3) | | | | | 1 |
| Nomination note | 1 | 2 | 3 | 4 | | |
| Against public vote | Coolio, John | Chantelle, Makosi, Nadia, Nick, Nikki, Ulrika | Michelle, Nick, Vanessa | Brian, Chantelle, Nick, Nikki, Preston, Ulrika, Victor | | |
| Walked | Josie | none | | | | |
| Ejected | none | Coolio | none | | | |
| Evicted | John; 50.6% to evict | Makosi; 47.7% to evict | Michelle; 39.3% to evict | Ulrika; 1.73% (out of 7) | Preston; 1.95% (out of 7) | |
| Evicted | John; 50.6% to evict | Makosi; 47.7% to evict | Michelle; 39.3% to evict | Nick; 5.72% (out of 7) | Victor; 8.86% (out of 7) | |
| Evicted | John; 50.6% to evict | Nádia; 33.2% to evict | Vanessa; 31.3% to evict | Chantelle; 20.51% (out of 3) | Nikki; 30.28% (out of 3) | |
| Evicted | John; 50.6% to evict | Nádia; 33.2% to evict | Vanessa; 31.3% to evict | Brian; 49.21% to win | | |

Notes

- ^Note 1: As Josie walked during the nomination process, all nominations for her became invalid and any housemates who nominated her had to later choose a replacement nominee. John originally nominated Josie and Coolio for eviction, but post-Josie's exit replaced his nomination for Josie with Brian.
- ^Note 2: As new housemates, Michelle and Victor were exempt from nominations. Whilst nominating, housemates had to endure various individual tasks from past series of Big Brother in "Nostalgic Nominations". This week there was a double eviction, meaning the three or more housemates with the most nominations faced eviction. Had this been a single eviction, only Makosi and Nick would have faced the public vote.
- ^Note 3: During Day 13's nominations, housemates participated in "Nominations Roulette" - with the wheel determining what how a housemate must deliver their nominations to Big Brother. As with the previous week, this week was a double eviction, meaning the three or more housemates with the most nominations faced eviction. Had this been a single eviction, the same housemates would still have faced the public vote. Even though she was a new housemate, Vanessa was permitted to nominate and could be nominated so that she did not have a free pass to the final.
- ^Note 4: For the final two days, the public were voting for who they wanted to win rather than to evict.

== Summary ==
Daily summary
| Day 1 | Tasks | John was given a task by the Tree of Temptation to be "Mr. Nice Guy" to everyone in the house. Successfully convincing the majority of the house that he is behaving nicely would make him eligible for eviction, however, failure would result in immunity from the first eviction. |
| Day 1 | Entrances | After leaving the house as the winner of Big Brother 11, Josie reentered the house space later. She was joined by Preston, Chantelle, Nadia, Brian, Ulrika, Makosi, John, Coolio, Nikki, and Nick. |
| Day 2 | Tasks | For the shopping task, Nikki was the sole participant in a task called "Who Is She?", an ode to one of her catchphrases. The first part of the task involved her identifying five female housemates from series past by touch only; each correct response earned her £50. She correctly guessed three housemates, earning £150 towards shopping. The second part of the task had Nikki identifying a female housemate (Lisa) from Big Brother 4 amongst a lineup of four people claiming the identity. Nikki correctly figured out the housemate, and won £500 extra, for a total of £650 towards shopping. |
| Day 3 | Tasks | Nick was set a task by the Tree of Temptation to write down the names of the housemates who would face the public vote on pieces of paper and hide them in the House. Houseguest Darren was sent into the house later that day by the Tree to find the pieces of paper and announce to the House that Coolio and John were up for eviction.; The housemates were asked to vote on whether or not John was behaving nicely. As the majority of the house thought John was being Mr. Nice Guy, he passed his task and thus was eligible to be nominated and evicted. |
| Day 3 | Exits | Josie voluntarily left the house through the garden door during nominations. As a result, nominations were temporarily suspended until the situation was contained. Any housemate who nominated her was required to nominate another housemate. |
| Day 4 | Tasks | Nikki was given a task to complete within three hours. She was to interview all the housemates and using a typewriter, type up the results for her News of the World column. She successfully passed, and all the housemates won a party.; Upon entering the Big Brother Bedsit, Michelle and Victor were given the task by Big Brother to play pranks on and reward the House, similar to what Michelle did when she entered the original Bedsit in Big Brother 5. Their first task was to send in a clown named Mr. Snuggles, who would then greatly bother a certain housemate of their choice. They chose Nikki. |
| Day 4 | Exits | John was the first person to be evicted from the House, with 50.6% of the vote to evict over Coolio; with only a little more than 1% separating the two, this was the second closest ever margin in Big Brother history. |
| Day 4 | Entrances | Victor and Michelle entered the Big Brother Bedsit, where they would stay for the next few days wreaking havoc on the House, unbeknownst to the other housemates. |
| Day 5 | Tasks | Victor and Michelle, who were still in the Bedsit, were given another task by Big Brother. They were to give one housemate of their choice a slave for one hour. They chose Nadia, whose slave was Big Brother 9's Stuart. Later that day, Big Brother asked them to give two housemates a private party. They chose Brian and Nick.; The housemates played a party game, which was watched by Victor and Michelle in the Bedsit. Each housemate was given a photo of one of their fellow housemates |
| Day 5 | Exits | Coolio left the Big Brother House after it was mutually decided between him and Big Brother that it would be best for him to leave, due to an ongoing verbal spat between him and Nadia. Though technically an ejection, it was considered a voluntary exit on the series. |
| Day 6 | Tasks | The housemates bar Ulrika were given papier-mâché big head caricatures of themselves as part of today's Big Heads task. They were then given the challenge of staying in them for as close to one hour as possible, with the housemate closest to sixty minutes declared the winner. Ulrika was also given the secret task of predicting who would remove their big head off first, who would win the challenge, who would moan the most. She chose Nadia, Brian, and Nikki respectively. She correctly guessed Nadia would remove her head off first, and thus won treats for the House. Preston was the winner of this task (removing his head at 1 hour 1 minute 55 seconds), and won a special "prize" in the form of two new housemates: Michelle and Victor. |
| Day 6 | Entrances | Michelle and Victor entered the main house in the afternoon. |
| Day 7 | Tasks | The housemates (bar Michelle and Victor, who entered the house the previous day) took part in their second round of nominations. However, as Big Brother was feeling nostalgic, each housemate was required to complete a task from a previous series whilst they nominated. The housemates were subject to the following tasks: Housemate / Task / Series; Brian / To consume five spicy chillies whilst he nominated. / Series 9; Chantelle / To wear a lycra suit installed with shock pads that would give off an electric shock at any time during her nominations. / Series 9; Makosi / To produce at least 5 mL of tears using specially-fitted goggles whilst she nominated. / Series 6; Nadia / To spell out the name of each housemate she wanted to nominate. / Series 5; Nick / To ignore the antics of a clown positioned behind the Diary Room chair. / Series 11; Nikki / To brush her teeth with stinky tofu whilst she nominated. However, Nikki refused, and was instead given the shock task that was also given to Chantelle. / Series 9; Preston / To consume a series of ice shots as quickly as possible (thus ensuring a brain freeze) whilst he nominated. / Celebrity series 7; Ulrika / To be subjected to cake dropping on her head at any point during her nominations. / Celebrity series 7; Big Brother 1 winner Craig entered the house to compete against the housemates in a building task. With only screwdrivers, the ten housemates had to build a shed faster than Craig and his power tools could. They failed to complete it before Craig did. Craig then asked the housemates to name the two housemates who they thought contributed the least to the task. Brian and Chantelle were chosen. Craig then revealed that he would choose to evict one of them and replace them as a housemate. This was then revealed to be a hoax. |
| Day 8 | Tasks | The housemates were to recreate the series 7 majorette task, this time to new choreography set to the music of Bad Romance by Lady Gaga. Nikki was chosen to be the head choreographer, whilst Chantelle was chosen to be the troop leader. As housemates performed the dance number to an acceptable standard set by an independent adjudicator, they passed this task.; Brian was set a secret task by the Tree of Temptation. In order to win cocktails for the house, he had one hour to get three housemates to confess to him that they were the most famous person in the house. He failed the task, and as a result, one of his Diary Room visits later that night was badly edited. |
| Day 8 | Twists | For nominations results, housemates were each given a baton with their name on it. They were to open the baton and read a note inside that indicated if they were safe or nominated for eviction. |
| Day 9 | Tasks | For this week's "Back in Time" shopping task, housemates had to recreate various tasks from past series over the next three days. For the first day, Ulrika and Nick had to perform Endless Love by Diana Ross; a task Ulrika performed with Verne Troyer in her respective series. In order to pass their task, the video of their performance had to receive more hits than the original performance on the official website in the same amount of time. Preston had to eat a box of chocolate liqueurs in two hours without getting sick; a task he also took part in his respective series. Makosi had to once again become the unluckiest housemate, recreating her secret mission in series 6 by making herself the most unpopular housemate; however, unbeknownst to her, Big Brother informed the rest of the house that the real task was to ignore any attempt Makosi made to be unpopular. |
| Day 9 | Entrances | Ahmed Aghil from series 5 entered the house for a few hours to recreate his famous plate smashing incident. |
| Day 10 | Tasks | The second day of the shopping task saw Chantelle, Victor, and Nadia become Kandy Floss (With A K) – Chantelle's fictional band made up for her secret task in Celebrity Big Brother 4 – and perform for the housemates the band's hit song "I Want It Right Now." Makosi was to wear a green lycra suit, which she was falsely told would edit her out of the show. Brian was tasked with running to a circular platform in the middle of the backyard whenever he heard the phrase "Bubble, hold me". He would then have to dance to music with former housemates. |
| Day 10 | Entrances | Big Brother 6 winner Anthony entered the house to have a picnic with Makosi as part of her task. Marco from Big Brother 5, Sam and Amanda from Big Brother 8, and Glyn from Big Brother 7 entered the house to dance with Brian as part of his task. |

== Production ==
The series was first announced during the launch night of the eleventh series of Big Brother. The first trailer for Ultimate Big Brother was shown on 13 August 2010 during a live eviction episode of Big Brother. On the same day, Channel 4 released a promo image for the series on the Big Brother website. The promo featured 15 of the previous 186 Big Brother housemates and 68 Celebrity Big Brother housemates, along with the tag line "Who goes in? We decide".

=== Broadcasts ===
The Launch Night and first broadcast of Ultimate Big Brother was on 24 August 2010 as part of the Big Brother 11 final night show, presented by Davina McCall.

The main television coverage of Ultimate Big Brother was screened on Channel 4 using daily highlights programmes, narrated by Marcus Bentley. These episodes summarised the events of the previous day in the House. Although the schedule was erratic, in general the Monday to Thursday highlights episodes were shown at 10 pm and aired for 70 minutes, whilst the weekend shows aired for 60 minutes at 9 pm. The two-part, live eviction shows, hosted by Davina McCall, featured a highlights episode 9 pm and a second show at 10:35 pm in which the evicted housemate (or housemates) were interviewed. Eviction shows and highlights episodes were given a censored repeat the following morning on both Channel 4 and E4.

Alongside these highlights shows were spin-off programmes, Big Brother's Big Mouth and Big Brother's Little Brother, which comment on fandom, cultural reaction to the events within the House and include interviews with celebrities, former housemates and family and friends of housemates. Emma Willis and George Lamb presented Big Brother's Little Brother live on E4 at 6 pm for 30 minutes Monday to Friday and on Channel 4 for an hour Sunday lunchtime. Big Brother's Big Mouth was fronted by McCall and aired on E4 for an hour after the main eviction programme.

=== Logo ===
The eye logo remained the same from Big Brother 2010.

=== House ===
Since the third series in 2002, the programme was filmed at Elstree Studios in Borehamwood, Hertfordshire. The House for Ultimate Big Brother was the same House used for the eleventh series and was mainly glass walled with floral designs. The entrance had a heaven theme with a single staircase and the Diary Room underneath, to the right hand side. The Diary Room reflected the heaven theme with wings on the chair and a sky scene as the backdrop. A small task room was located off of the Diary Room. Upon entering the living room, there was one large red sofa. In contrast to the kitchen and bathroom's modern effect, the bedroom consisted of Salvador Dalí designs on the beds.

The bedroom also contained a walk-in wardrobe. The store room for the house was located off of the kitchen. The garden had a carnival theme and included a carousel (for the smoking area) and a snug (called the nest). The garden also contained a mini pool/tub and outdoor showers. A large task room was located off of the garden and the garden toilet could be used to access a smaller task room. On the penultimate day of Big Brother 2010 it was revealed that a few changes had been made to the house prior to Ultimate Big Brother beginning; the glass walls of the shower were made frosted and the cameras were removed from the toilets in order to respect the privacy of the celebrity housemates.

The House included several features present from Big Brother 2010:

- Bob Righter – a fortune teller machine used to predict the future,
- Davina McCaw – a mechanical parrot in the living room used to recall previous conversations made by the housemates,
- Tree of Temptation – a chest of drawers in the bathroom made from the Tree of Temptation present in 2010's celebrity series.

In celebration of the final series the House also included a secret bedsit, which had previously been used in Big Brother 2004. The Ultimate Big Brother bedsit housed Michelle Bass and Victor Ebuwa from Day 4 to Day 6. The bedsit had its own Diary Room (a copy of the Diary Room from Big Brother 5; albeit with the Diary Room chair similar to that from Big Brother 3) and was used to spy on and reward or punish the housemates. Michelle also inhabited the 2004 series' bedsit with Emma Greenwood and Victor was one of their prank victims.

=== Title sequence ===
The title sequence remained similar to the titles used during Big Brother 11, but also incorporated short fragments of each of the title sequences from the other ten regular series of Big Brother.

=== Format ===
The editing format used was similar to the previous regular series, as was the eviction format, except all housemates interviews were performed outside instead of in the studio and songs were played as they exited the house*, however the three finalists Brian, Nikki and Chantelle all left the house to a live brass band. Songs played were:

- Brian - "Never Forget" by Take That
- Nikki - "Crazy" by Gnarls Barkley
- Chantelle - "She's So Lovely" by Scouting for Girls
- Victor - "Here Comes the Hotstepper" by Ini Kamoze
- Nick - "Bad" by Michael Jackson
- Preston - "Boys Will Be Boys" by The Ordinary Boys
- Ulrika - "My First Kiss" by 3OH!3 featuring Ke$ha
- Vanessa - "Turn Around" by Phats & Small
- Michelle - "Dynamite" by Taio Cruz
- Nadia - "A Little Bit of Action" by Nadia Almada
- Makosi - "Bootylicious" by Destiny's Child
- John - "Rude Boy" by Rihanna
- Note: Josie and Coolio did not leave via the eviction process.

== Ratings ==
These viewing figures are taken from BARB and include Channel 4 +1 (except those marked with an asterisk*).

Ratings (millions)
| | Week 1 | | Week 2 | | |
|---|---|---|---|---|---|
| Saturday | - | 2.75 | 2.29 | | |
| Sunday | - | 2.22 | 2.68 | | |
| Monday | - | 2.57 | 2.76 | | |
| Tuesday | 4.29 | 2.92 | 2.54 | | |
| Wednesday | 3.62 | 2.97 | 2.83 | | |
| Wednesday | 3.62 | 2.97 | 2.2 | | |
| Thursday | 3.51 | 2.8 | 2.2 | | |
| Friday | 3.31 | 2.72 | 2.85 | | |
| Friday | 2.78 | 2.59 | 3.28 | 3.66 | 4.08 |
| Weekly average | 3 | | 2.85 | | |
| Running average | 3 | | 2.93 | | |
| Series average | 2.93 | | | | |

== Final series commemorations ==
=== Additional programming ===
During the final week of Ultimate Big Brother, two special edition programs aired on Channel 4. The first of these was a Come Dine with Me special episode, called Come Dine with Me: Big Brother Winners, which aired on 6 September 2010. This episode featured Brian Dowling (Big Brother 2 winner), Nadia Almada (Big Brother 5 winner), Brian Belo (Big Brother 8 winner) and Sophie Reade (Big Brother 10 winner). Dowling came first in this competition, winning £1,000 for charity. The second of these special edition programmes was an 8 Out of 10 Cats special; 8 Out of 10 Cats: Big Brother Special, which aired on 9 September 2010. This episode featured Big Brother winners Brian Belo and Josie Gibson as panelists, ex-housemates John James Parton, Aisleyne Horgan-Wallace, Eugene Sully, Makosi Musambasi, Mario Marconi and Amanda and Sam Marchant as special guests and a voice-over from Big Brother narrator Marcus Bentley. Gibson's team beat Belo's with scores of 4 and 3 respectively. In addition to these programmes, Davina McCall was a guest on Alan Carr: Chatty Man on 5 September 2010 to discuss Ultimate Big Brother. The first series of Big Brother was also a major discussion topic on the one-off Channel 4 programme My Funniest Year: 2000, which featured Craig Phillips and Nick Bateman as guests and aired on 4 September 2010.

Two special, one-off programmes also aired on Channel 4 on the final night of Ultimate Big Brother on 10 September 2010. Dermot O'Leary, former Big Brother's Little Brother presenter, was joined by 11 former housemates (Craig Phillips, Narinder Kaur, Alex Sibley, Cameron Stout, Marco Sabba, Anthony Hutton, Pete Bennett, Brian Belo, Rex Newmark, Bea Hamill and Ben Duncan) in Big Brother: Dermot's Last Supper to discuss the most memorable moments from the last 11 regular Big Brother series. Following this, Davina McCall relived some of her most unforgettable moments from Big Brother history in front of an audience of fans and former housemates, including Celebrity Big Brother 4 contestant Pete Burns, in Davina's Big Send Off.

=== Jade Goody: Ultimate Housemate ===
During the first show of the Ultimate Big Brother final, a 10-minute documentary entitled Jade Goody: Ultimate Housemate was shown in memory of Big Brother contestant Jade Goody, who died in March 2009 from cervical cancer. Goody appeared in Big Brother 3, Celebrity Big Brother 5 and Big Brother Panto and in the second season of Bigg Boss, the Indian version of Big Brother.

=== DVD release ===
To commemorate the 11 regular Big Brother series, Channel 4 released Big Brother's Big DVD on 30 August 2010. The DVD contains three fan favourite episodes as voted for by viewers and Davina McCall; Emma and Michelle move into the bedsit in Big Brother 5, the electric shock task from Big Brother 9 and robots take over the House in Big Brother 11. The DVD also includes a rundown of the best bits of all 11 series of Big Brother from 2000 to 2010.
