= Big Brother (British TV series) series 5 =

Coordinates: 51°39′23″N 0°16′02″W

Big Brother
- Series 5
- Series five logo
- Presented by: Davina McCall
- No. of days: 71
- No. of housemates: 13
- Winner: Nádia Almada
- Runner-up: Jason Cowan
- Companion shows: Big Brother's Little Brother; Big Brother's Efourum; Big Brother Live; Nominations Uncut; Saturday Night Live
- No. of episodes: 82

Release
- Original network: Channel 4
- Original release: 28 May – 6 August 2004

Series chronology
- ← Previous; Series 4 Next → Series 6

Big Brother 2004, also known as Big Brother 5, is the fifth series of the British reality television series Big Brother. The show followed thirteen contestants, known as housemates, who were isolated from the outside world for an extended period of time in a custom-built House. Each week, one or more of the housemates were eliminated from the competition and left the House. The last remaining housemate, Nádia Almada, was declared the winner, winning a cash prize of £63,500.

The series launched on Channel 4 on 28 May 2004 and ended on 6 August 2004. It lasted 71 days - the longest series of Big Brother UK at the time and the eighth longest series to date. Davina McCall returned as presenter for her fifth consecutive year. Twelve housemates entered on launch night, with one additional housemate being introduced in the fifth week.

Following the negative reception of the "boring" previous series, several changes were made to the format. Big Brother became "evil", resulting in a higher-pressure environment for the housemates, more difficult tasks, fewer luxuries and more twists. Big Brother 5 ultimately became most memorable, and the subject of viewer complaints and press attention, for a physical altercation between housemates in the early hours of Day 20, which later became referred to by fans and in the press as "Fight Night".

The series was watched by an average of 5.1 million viewers, the second highest viewed series of the show to date (after Big Brother 3).

== Housemates ==
Name	Age on entry	Hometown	Day entered	Day exited	Result
Nádia Almada	27	London (originally from Madeira, Portugal)	1	71	Winner
Jason Cowan	30	South Lanarkshire	1	71	Runner-up
Daniel Bryan	30	Hull	1	71	3rd place
Shell Jubin	22	Glasgow	1	71	4th place
Stuart Wilson	20	Macclesfield	1	69	Evicted
Michelle Bass	23	Newcastle upon Tyne	1	64	Evicted
Victor Ebuwa	23	London	1	57	Evicted
Ahmed Aghil	44	Liverpool/London (originally from Somalia)	1	50	Evicted
Becki Seddiki	33	London	31	43	Evicted
Marco Sabba	21	Middlesex	1	36	Evicted
Vanessa Nimmo	26	South Africa	1	29	Evicted
Emma Greenwood	20	Oldham	1	23	Ejected
Kitten Pinder	24	Brighton	1	8	Ejected

== Nominations table ==
	Week 1	Week 2	Week 3	Week 4	Week 5	Week 6	Week 7	Week 8	Week 9	Week 10 Final		Nominations received
Nádia	No nominations	Ahmed, Daniel	Daniel, Vanessa	No nominations	Jason, Victor	Jason, Victor	Private in task	Jason, Victor	No nominations	Winner (Day 71)		13
Jason	No nominations	Marco, Emma	Nádia, Marco	No nominations	Nádia, Marco	Banned	Sergeant in task	Nádia, Daniel	No nominations	Runner-up (Day 71)		13
Daniel	No nominations	Ahmed, Michelle	Nádia, Ahmed	No nominations	Marco, Jason	Victor, Becki	Private in task	Victor, Shell	No nominations	Third place (Day 71)		13
Shell	No nominations	Ahmed, Michelle	Ahmed, Daniel	No nominations	Marco, Nádia	Becki, Jason	Private in task	Jason, Victor	No nominations	Fourth place (Day 71)		2
Stuart	No nominations	Ahmed, Vanessa	Daniel, Vanessa	No nominations	Shell, Nádia	Ahmed, Becki	Private in task	Daniel, Nádia	No nominations	Evicted (Day 69)		0
Michelle	No nominations	Ahmed, Jason	Victor, Jason	No nominations	Jason, Ahmed	Ahmed, Becki	Sergeant in task	Jason, Daniel	No nominations	Evicted (Day 64)		4
Victor	No nominations	Emma, Nádia	Daniel, Vanessa	No nominations	Marco, Nádia	Banned	Private in task	Daniel, Nádia	Evicted (Day 57)			10
Ahmed	No nominations	Marco, Emma	Vanessa, Marco	No nominations	Marco, Nádia	Nádia, Daniel	Private in task	Evicted (Day 50)				14
Becki	Not in House				Michelle	Daniel, Ahmed	Evicted (Day 43)					4
Marco	No nominations	Jason, Ahmed	Daniel, Vanessa	No nominations	Jason, Victor	Evicted (Day 36)						9
Vanessa	No nominations	Ahmed, Michelle	Ahmed, Nádia	No nominations	Evicted (Day 29)							6
Emma	No nominations	Victor, Daniel	Victor, Jason	Ejected (Day 23)								3
Kitten	No nominations	Ejected (Day 8)										N/A
Notes	1	2	3	4	5	6	7	none	8	9		
Against public vote	none	Ahmed, Emma, Michelle	Daniel, Vanessa		Marco, Michelle, Nádia	Ahmed, Becki	Ahmed, Daniel, Nádia, Shell, Stuart, Victor	Daniel, Jason, Nádia, Victor	Daniel, Jason, Michelle, Nádia, Shell, Stuart	Daniel, Jason, Nádia, Shell, Stuart		
Ejected	Kitten	none	Emma	none								
Evicted	None	Emma; 29% to move	Eviction postponed	Vanessa; 86% to evict	Marco; 52% to evict	Becki; 62% to evict	Ahmed; 56% to evict	Victor; 47% to evict	Michelle; 67% to evict	Stuart; 7% (out of 5)	Shell; 9% (out of 4)	
Evicted	None	Emma; 29% to move	Eviction postponed	Vanessa; 86% to evict	Marco; 52% to evict	Becki; 62% to evict	Ahmed; 56% to evict	Victor; 47% to evict	Michelle; 67% to evict	Daniel; 17% (out of 3)	Jason; 26% (out of 2)	
Evicted	None	Michelle; 54% to move	Eviction postponed	Vanessa; 86% to evict	Marco; 52% to evict	Becki; 62% to evict	Ahmed; 56% to evict	Victor; 47% to evict	Michelle; 67% to evict	Daniel; 17% (out of 3)	Jason; 26% (out of 2)	
Evicted	None	Michelle; 54% to move	Eviction postponed	Vanessa; 86% to evict	Marco; 52% to evict	Becki; 62% to evict	Ahmed; 56% to evict	Victor; 47% to evict	Michelle; 67% to evict	Nádia; 74% to win		

Notes

- ^Note 1: There were no nominations in Week 1; on Day 2, housemates were instead asked to nominate one person who they felt was least deserving of their suitcase. Kitten - despite refusing to participate - received the most votes and did not receive her suitcase for the rest of her stay in the house. Kitten was later ejected by Big Brother on Day 8 after constant rule breaking; Kitten was deemed on the show to be the first person evicted from the house, however, this is technically an ejection, as she was not voted out via a public nor an internal house vote.
- ^Note 2: The housemates were told there was a double eviction. In reality, the public voted for which two housemates would enter a secret Big Brother Bedsit, where the two evictees would live for five days, be able to watch their fellow housemates on a television screen, and then return to the house, still eligible to win the prize money. Emma and Michelle received the most votes and moved into the Bedsit. Initially planned for Week 1, the Bedsit twist was postponed one week due to Kitten's ejection from the house.
- ^Note 3: Emma and Michelle made their nominations from the Bedsit. The other housemates could not nominate them, assuming they had been evicted.
- ^Note 4: Due to the fallout from the fighting on Day 20 and Emma’s ejection from the house on Day 23, Week 3’s eviction was postponed until Week 4. There were thus no nominations in Week 4, and Daniel and Vanessa remained the nominees for eviction.
- ^Note 5: As a new housemate, Becki could not be nominated by her fellow housemates and believed she could not nominate. However, Big Brother told her that she had to nominate one housemate, who would automatically face eviction, by kissing them on both cheeks. If she didn't do this, she would automatically face eviction. Becki kissed Michelle, meaning she was up for eviction against the two housemates with the most nominations, Marco and Nádia.
- ^Note 6: As punishment for constant discussion of nominations, Jason and Victor were banned from nominating.
- ^Note 7: There were no nominations in Week 8; the weekly army-themed task determined instead who would face the public vote. Sergeants Jason and Michelle were made privy to the nominations twist. If the privates passed the task, all six privates would face eviction. If the privates failed, sergeants would face eviction. The Privates passed, meaning the six of them faced eviction.
- ^Note 8: There were no nominations in Week 9. Instead, all housemates automatically faced eviction; this news was not made privy to them until the actual eviction on Day 64.
- ^Note 9: There were no nominations in the final week. On Day 69, a vote count was done and the housemate with the least public votes to win secretly left the house in a surprise eviction during a party. Stuart was evicted, leaving Daniel, Jason, Nádia and Shell in the final four.

== Weekly summary ==
Week 1	Entrances	On Day 1, Marco, Ahmed, Jason, Daniel, Stuart, Victor, Vanessa, Emma, Kitten, Michelle, Shell and Nadia entered the house.
Week 1	Twists	On Day 2, the housemates were individually called to the Diary Room and had to nominate one housemate they felt was least deserving of their suitcase. Kitten chose not to go into the Diary Room to vote, thus automatically selecting herself. Jason, Marco, Michelle, Shell, Vanessa and Victor voted for Kitten, Ahmed and Nádia voted for Michelle, Daniel voted for Marco, Emma voted for Victor, and Stuart voted for Ahmed. Kitten received the most votes and, therefore, would not receive her suitcase for the remainder of her time in the house.
Week 1	Punishments	On Day 5, the housemates moved the alcohol fridge into the bedroom and were reprimanded by Big Brother.; Throughout the first five days, Kitten received multiple warnings for constantly breaking Big Brother's rules. On Day 6, Kitten received her third and final strike for painting the mirrors in the house.
Week 1	Exits	On Day 8, Kitten was ejected from the house after constant rule-breaking. Kitten refused to leave the house, thus Big Brother revealed that the grand prize of £100,000 would decrease by £10,000 for each minute Kitten spent in the house. Kitten left the house just under a minute later, losing the group £9,000. This brought the grand prize to a total of £91,000.
Week 2	Tasks	On Day 9, the housemates were given a task in which they had to select one housemate who they felt was the smartest and another housemate who they felt was the strongest. Stuart and Jason were selected respectively. Stuart had to answer nine general knowledge questions in the diary room, with the grand prize fund being reduced by £1,000 for each incorrect answer he gave. Outside, the other housemates were strapped onto a turntable, which Jason was required to spin around in circles. For each question Stuart answered correctly, a housemate could be removed from the turntable, making it easier to spin. Stuart answered four questions incorrectly and lost the group £5,000. Ahmed refused to participate in the task, thus costing the group another £1,000, bringing the grand prize fund to £85,000.; On Day 10, the housemates were given their first weekly task. The housemates were required to run a fast food restaurant in which Big Brother could place an order at any time, and housemates were required to make the order and take it to the diary room within thirty minutes. The task lasted for a total of four days. Completion of the task would result in the housemates receiving a privilege pass, which they could redeem for a privilege in the house. The housemates failed the task.
Week 2	Nominations	On Day 11, the housemates nominated for the first time. Ahmed, Emma and Michelle received the most nominations and faced the public vote.
Week 2	Exits	On Day 15, Emma and Michelle were evicted from the house, receiving 29% and 54% of the public vote to evict, respectively. However, this was a fake eviction and Emma and Michelle instead moved into the Big Brother Bedsit, where they could watch and hear everything going on in the house.
Week 3	Tasks	During Emma and Michelle's stay in the Bedsit, they were required to give out punishments to the other housemates. On Day 16, they chose Victor to take cold showers. On Day 17, they chose to make a cake for the housemates, with chilli powder added to the cake. On Day 18, they chose to vandalize Jason's bed. On Day 19, they chose to put itching powder in one of Vanessa's shirts. They officially returned to the house on Day 20.; On Day 16, the housemates were given a task in which Daniel, Jason, Stuart and Vanessa took part in a human wheelbarrow race. Each pair took turns collecting tokens, each token being worth ten seconds. The number of tokens collected determined how long the housemates would have to complete the second part of the challenge. The second half required the remaining housemates to hang over the garden for the time they earned in the first part of the challenge. If a housemate fell, then the prize fund was reduced by £2,000. Following this task, the prize fund was £77,000.; On Day 17, the housemates were given their second weekly task, which had a football theme to coincide with the Euro 2004 championship. The first portion of the task required housemates to select a country and make a mascot for the team.
Week 3	Nominations	On Day 18, the housemates nominated for the second time. As Emma and Michelle were secretly in the Bedsit, they could not be nominated but were allowed to make nominations. Daniel and Vanessa received the most nominations and faced the public vote.
Week 3	Punishments	On Day 20, multiple fights occurred over the night. The fight resulted in everyone getting a formal warning. Emma was sent back to the Big Brother Bedsit.
Week 3	Exits	On Day 23, Emma was ejected from the house due to the recent fighting in the house. The eviction that was scheduled between Daniel and Vanessa was postponed, and took place the next week, with Daniel and Vanessa remaining nominated.
Week 4	Tasks	On Day 25, the housemates were given a task in which they had to cast their own body parts in plaster and attach them to a chicken-wire frame, thus creating the "perfect housemate".; On Day 26, the housemates were given a task, in which they had to create a film based on their time in the house, with the housemates portraying one another.
Week 4	Punishments	On Day 21, all housemates were called to the diary room and given their first official warnings about the violence in the house that occurred.
Week 4	Exits	On Day 29, Vanessa was evicted from the house, receiving 86% of the public vote to evict.
Week 5	Entrances	On Day 31, Becki entered the house.
Week 5	Tasks	On Day 30, the housemates were given a task, in which they were required to stake £10,000 on the outcome of three different tests. If they fail a test, they will lose the amount they wagered on this. They wagered a total of £3,000 on the first part of the task, which required Victor to unscramble a word. He failed the task. The second portion saw the housemates wagering £1,000. Victor and Jason had to roll Michelle around in a giant ball, knocking over obstacles within a time limit. They passed this task. The housemates wagered £6,000 on the final portion of the task, which required housemates to guide a loop around wires attached to a helmet on Shell's head. They passed this task, thus only losing a total of £3,000, leaving the prize fund at £74,000.; On Day 32, the housemates were given their next weekly shopping task. For the first part, housemates had twenty seconds to gather costumes provided by Big Brother and get on stage before a song began. The housemates passed their shopping task and earned a luxury shopping budget.
Week 5	Nominations	The housemates nominated for the third time. Marco and Nadia received the most nominations and faced the public vote. As a new housemate, Becki was immune from being nominated. Becki was also secretly required to select one housemate to nominate by kissing them on both cheeks. She selected Michelle, who was therefore also nominated for eviction.
Week 5	Exits	On Day 36, Marco was evicted from the house, receiving 52% of the public vote to evict.
Week 6	Tasks	On Day 37, the housemates were given a task in which the housemates were split into being either farmers or cows. The cows were blindfolded and had to be guided around a course by the farmers. The farmers used cattle prods to guide the cows. The housemates failed the task and the prize fund was dropped by £2,500, leaving the prize fund at £71,500.; On Day 39, the housemates were given their next weekly shopping task, which was based on going back to school. Housemates had to attend registration in the morning, and were set several mini-tasks based on school subjects. They failed the task after Nadia misspelt "balloon" in a spelling bee task.
Week 6	Nominations	Michelle was given her first and final warning after stealing the diary room camera and trying to set it on fire. Daniel, Nadia, Shell and Stuart were also issued a warning since they helped Michelle. Stuart was individually punished by being made to watch a video of his cowboy hat being burned.; Due to discussing nominations, Jason and Victor were banned from nominating this week.
Week 6	Nominations	The housemates nominated for the fourth time. Ahmed and Becki received the most nominations and faced the public vote.
Week 6	Exits	On Day 43, Becki was evicted from the house, receiving 62% of the public vote to evict.
Week 7	Tasks	On Day 44, the housemates were given a task in which they were sent to boot camp. Jason and Michelle were selected as sergeants, while the rest of the housemates were privates. In the diary room, Jason and Michelle were told that if the privates passed the task, then they would be up for eviction. If the privates failed the task, then the two sergeants would be nominated. The sergeants passed the task.; On Day 48, the housemates took part in a dating service. Each housemate was required to deliver their own dating message in the diary room in order to present themselves to a potential "love interest". They passed this task and earned alcohol as a reward.
Week 7	Nominations	Due to the outcome of the boot camp task, Ahmed, Daniel, Nadia, Shell, Stuart and Victor faced the public vote.
Week 7	Exits	On Day 50, Ahmed was evicted from the house, receiving 56% of the public vote to evict.
Week 8	Tasks	On Day 51, the housemates were given a task in which they had to pick one person to be the "Intellectual" and another to be the "Selector". The rest of the housemates were the "Physicals". The "Intellectual" housemate was required to answer general knowledge questions. Every time they answered a question wrong, one of the "Physical" housemates fell from a giant staircase into a tank of fish guts. The housemates failed this task and lost £15,000. After they found out that they lost, the "Selector", Michelle, was asked to drink a milkshake made from fish guts. Passing this task would result in the £15,000 being added back. Michelle failed to drink the milkshake and the prize fund stayed at £56,500.; On Day 53, the housemates were given a task in which Shell and Victor were chosen as the bride and groom for a wedding. Nadia was the bridesmaid, Daniel was the best man, Jason held the service and Michelle sang at the service. The housemates took part in all the traditional events of a wedding. The housemates failed the task.; On Day 57, the housemates were given a task in which they had one house to create a two-minute mime performance. Passing this task would result in an ice cream machine being added to the house. The housemates failed the task.
Week 8	Nominations	The housemates nominated for the fifth time. Daniel, Jason, Nadia and Victor received the most nominations and faced the public vote.
Week 8	Exits	On Day 57, Victor was evicted from the house, receiving 47% of the public vote to evict.
Week 9	Tasks	On Day 60, the housemates were given a task in which they were all weighed. They were then chained together in pairs based on their weight. Daniel and Nádia, the heaviest man and woman were shackled together by the foot. Jason and Michelle were chained together by the arm. Stuart and Shell were shacked together by the waist. The housemates were made to stay shackled together except for when they were in the diary room or in the bathroom. They were required to apply each others' makeup and brush each other's teeth, as well as complete mini-tasks. The housemates passed this task, receiving letters from home and doubling their shopping budget.
Week 9	Nominations	This week no nominations took place. Instead, all housemates were automatically nominated for eviction.
Week 9	Exits	On Day 64, Michelle was evicted from the house, receiving 67% of the public vote to evict.
Week 10	Tasks	On Day 65, the housemates were given a task in which they were required to drink various shots that were made from either salt water, oil or fish guts. Passing this task would add £10,000 to the prize fund. The housemates passed this task, and the final prize fund total was £63,500.; On Day 66, the housemates were given a task in which they were provided with materials to make hand puppets that were similar to their fellow housemates. Later in the day, they were all then required to perform a puppet-show with the puppets they made. They passed this task and received an ice cream machine.; On Day 69, the housemates were given their final task in which they had to place some of their own items into a time-capsule and bury it in the garden. They passed this task and received a party. They were unaware that the party was a ruse
Week 10	Exits	On Day 69, in a surprise eviction, Stuart was evicted from the house, after only receiving 7% of the public vote to win.; On Day 71, Shell left the house in fourth place and Daniel left the house in third place. It was then revealed that Nadia was the winner, leaving Jason as the runner-up.

=== Suitcase voting ===
Housemate	Vote	Votes
Ahmed	Michelle	1
Daniel	Marco	0
Emma	Victor	0
Jason	Kitten	0
Kitten	Refused	7^{1}
Marco	Kitten	1
Michelle	Kitten	2
Nádia	Michelle	0
Shell	Kitten	0
Stuart	Ahmed	0
Vanessa	Kitten	0
Victor	Kitten	1

1. Kitten refused to vote and, therefore, cast a vote against herself. Even if she did vote, she would still not receive her suitcase.

== Production ==
=== Auditions ===
For the first time ever, housemates were selected via open auditions rather than via home video. The open audition process would go on to feature in each subsequent series until the thirteenth series in 2012.

=== Format ===
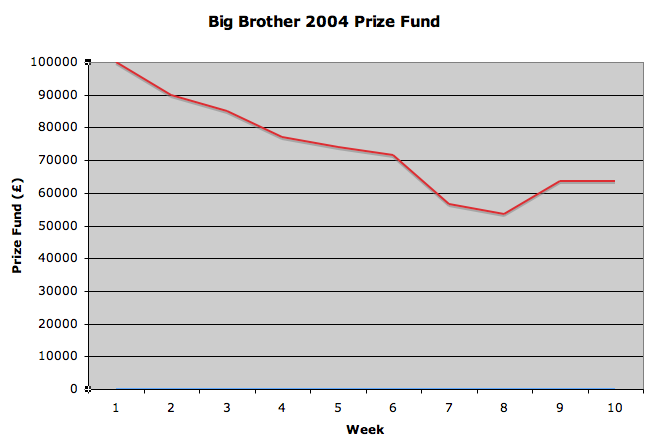
The Big Brother 5 prize fund

The series followed the same format as previous series of the programme. Twelve housemates lived in isolation from the outside world in a custom-built house for a period of 71 days, hoping to be the last one to leave the house as the winner and walk away with a large cash prize.

Promoted as "Big Brother goes evil", Big Brother 5 saw numerous changes occurring to the game. The main twist of this series was that the grand prize had been increased to £100,000 for the winner, but was gradually taken away as the series went on based on Housemates' performances in various tasks. Nádia Almada, as the winner of the series, received a total of £63,500, meaning that the housemates lost £36,500 across the series. This series also became known for featuring the Big Brother Bedsit, into which Michelle and Emma were sent, unknown to the other housemates, when "evicted" from the house. Whilst in the Bedsit, they had a live feed of the house, which aired in the room non-stop for their viewing pleasure. They were granted access back into the house after five days. Yet another change in the format occurred on Day 69, when the Housemate with the fewest votes to win, was secretly evicted from the house through the Diary Room. This meant that only four Housemates would appear at the final, instead of five.

=== Broadcasts ===
The series premiered on 28 May 2004, on Channel 4. The contestants were recorded 24 hours a day with cameras fixed around the house, and had to wear portable microphones. Big Brother 5 was the third of the main series to feature a live launch. The launch night saw Davina give a house tour, as well as discuss rumours that had been going on about the series. She then introduced the new Housemates, and they entered the house live.

Channel 4 broadcast a daily highlights show, and from the first week there was a live eviction show hosted by Davina McCall, where the evicted housemate was interviewed. In the nightly highlight episodes, viewers are shown various highlights of a specific day in the house. Big Brother 5 saw the return of the psychiatrists providing commentary on events in the game, with the episodes featuring them being the highlights show after the most recent eviction. The live eviction episode was held on Friday, with a pre-eviction episode and an official eviction episode being held with a 30-minute gap between them. The series ended on 6 August 2004, lasting for a total of 71 days. This made it the longest season of the series at the time.

Spin-off programme Big Brother's Little Brother returned for a fourth year and second year on Channel 4, and was hosted once again by Dermot O'Leary. Live coverage continued to be a major part of E4's daily and nightly schedule.

The Saturday Night Live spin-off series, first introduced in Big Brother 3, saw Housemates competing in live tasks. It would last until midway through this series when it was axed due to poor ratings.

A new spin-off programme entitled Big Brother's E-Fourum, a nod to the network, was hosted by comedian Russell Brand, and featured an audience and viewer discussion and debate on housemates and events going on inside the house. The latter programme returned in subsequent series under a retooled format and was renamed Big Brother's Big Mouth. E4 once again screened Nominations Uncut on Tuesdays featuring extended nominations. Another new show Diary Room Uncut was broadcast on Thursday evening, featuring extra material from the Diary Room, if no nominations took place, Diary Room Uncut would be shown in place of Nominations Uncut.

=== Prizes ===
The thirteen Housemates in the game were competing for the grand prize, which eventually amounted to £63,500. Each week, the Housemates attempted to complete various tasks assigned by Big Brother in exchange for a weekly budget, which they used to buy food and luxuries; this included buying things such as alcohol and cigarettes.

=== House ===
The Big Brother house has been located at Elstree Studios, Borehamwood, Hertfordshire since Big Brother 3 onward. To go along with the format change of the "evil" Big Brother this year, the house was much smaller in size. The house was one-third smaller, and featured an elevated floor and a lowered ceiling, adding a feeling of claustrophobia. The kitchen remained simple, with only necessities such as an oven (on which the only reference of time was located in the entire house), fridge, and sink. There was only one bedroom, and housemates were required to go through the garden to get to the bedroom. With eight single beds and two double beds, housemates were forced to share beds, and when a Housemate was evicted from the series, their bed was removed from the house, effectively preventing bed swapping. The showers in the bathroom this season were made of glass which led out into the garden, thus providing Housemates with no privacy. The Diary Room this season featured a red and blue background, with a large red chair which was attached to the wall. Big Brother 5 was the first series to not feature the chickens in the backyard. The house for this series was later described as being "horrible", with a member of production stating it was "designed to be as uncomfortable as possible, with none of the luxury gadgets of previous years."

==== Bedsit ====
Located behind the Diary Room, the bedsit contained one double bed, a small kitchen, a small bathroom, tattered armchairs, a telephone and flowery wallpaper, the only modern feature of the bedsit was the plasma screen where housemates could view the main house. Outside the bedsit was a corridor leading to the Diary Room. Due to the close proximity of the bedsit to the main house, housemates were required to speak quietly in the bedsit to avoid detection. The bedsit was resurrected six years later in Ultimate Big Brother.

== Viewership ==
These viewing figures are taken from BARB.

Viewers (in millions)
	Week 1		Week 2	Week 3	Week 4	Week 5	Week 6	Week 7	Week 8	Week 9	Week 10
Sat		3.86	3.09	2.85	3.22	3.2	2.56	2.71	2.89	3.25	2.78
Sun		3.89	3.01	4.23	4.05	3.64	4.65	4.03	4.58	4.28	1.73
Mon		3.53	4.42	5.01	5.27	4.91	4.89	5.1	5.7	5.35	5.5
Tue		4.5	4.7	6.13	5.21	5.77	5.58	6.59	6.26	5.35	5.71
Wed		4.71	4.79	6.70	4.98	5.35	5.54	6.41	6	5.38	6.02
Wed		4.71	4.79	6.70	4.98	5.35	5.54	6.41	6	5.38	7.7
Thu		5.1	4.76	6.95	2.17	4.92	5.61	5.6	5.99	5.19	5.09
Fri	7.23	4.55	5.17	4.99	4.45	5.28	5.19	5.66	5.36	5.77	6.41
Fri	7.23	5.36	6.24	6.22	5.66	6.07	5.87	6.27	6.27	6.57	8.98
Weekly average	4.75		4.52	5.39	4.38	4.89	4.99	5.3	5.3	5.14	5.55
Running average	4.75		4.64	4.88	4.76	4.78	4.82	4.88	4.95	4.97	5.03
Series average	5.03										

== Fight Night controversy ==
On Day 20 in the House, a series of altercations began, which eventually escalated and became physical. The incident was subsequently referred to as "Fight Night" by the press, fans of the show, and, in a live episode the night after the incident was shown, presenter Davina McCall.

=== Background ===
On Day 15, Emma and Michelle were sent to a secret room in the House named "the Bedsit" as part of a fake eviction. They were given access to live streaming from the House and were able to observe housemates' conversations and play pranks on them. Under the impression that they had been evicted, some of the remaining housemates spoke poorly of Emma and Michelle.

On 16 June, which was Day 20 in the House, Emma and Michelle were returned to the House from the Bedsit. Upon their return, the housemates were provided with fancy dress costumes, party food and alcohol.

=== Incident ===
In the early hours of 17 June, some of the housemates engaged in a playful food fight, leaving the communal living area in a mess. When Jason insisted that they tidy up their mess, Marco refused, prompting an argument between the pair. Nádia and Emma intervened in defence of Marco, with Nádia flipping over a table and, at one point, she slapped Jason.

The argument continued to escalate, with Emma and Victor squaring up to each other. Emma and Victor began throwing more food at each other, with Emma eventually throwing an empty tray at him. When Victor retaliated by throwing the same tray at Emma, hitting her in the back of the head, she raced towards him, and a scuffle ensued, while other housemates attempted to separate them. Big Brother repeatedly called Victor to the Diary Room and, as Stuart attempted to get him to comply, Emma was physically carried to the bedroom by Dan, whilst she screamed "I'll fucking kill you" at Victor.

The arguments led to Shell becoming very emotional, and she hid in the bathroom where she was comforted by Vanessa. Nádia entered the bathroom with the intent of apologising for upsetting Shell but ended up having an argument with Vanessa.

At the beginning of the altercations, Big Brother placed security guards into the camera runs surrounding the House. Approximately twenty minutes after the altercations began, Big Brother sent the guards into the House via the bedroom. Housemates were then separated and monitored throughout the night by guards stationed within the House.

=== Response within the House ===
The events of the night led Jason to decide to walk from the game, though he was later talked out of it. Emma was placed back in the Bedsit, in an attempt to separate her from the rest of the housemates. Housemates Jason, Marco, Nádia, Vanessa, and Victor were all given formal warnings by Big Brother as a result of their behaviour during the incident.

Due to the incident, the planned eviction for Day 22 was postponed until the following week; Daniel and Vanessa still remained nominated for eviction. On Day 23, after spending two days in the Bedsit, Emma was officially ejected from the House by Big Brother. In a statement released by the show, which was also read to the housemates, Big Brother clarified that there was no suggestion that she was "any more to blame" than anyone else for the incident, but that reintroducing her to the House "may [have increased] the risk of a repeat incident".

=== Public reaction, broadcaster response and aftermath ===
The event caused much controversy outside the House. Some of the incident was streamed live on Channel 4's sister channel E4, and online. Once the major scuffle between Emma and Victor ensued, the video stream cut to a "safety shot" of the garden. However, the audio continued, and screaming, shouting, glass breaking and Big Brother's repeated requests for Victor to come to the Diary Room could be heard. At approximately 2 am, live streaming was suspended and did not resume until 3:06 am. A number of viewers of the live streaming called the police over the incident, who arrived at the scene and requested a tape of the event. A spokeswoman for the Hertfordshire Constabulary stated: "Our officers are currently in liaison with members of the Big Brother production team to see whether further action needs to be taken."

The incident led to backlash from viewers, who criticized Channel 4. At 6 pm on 17 June, Channel 4 and Endemol issued the following statement:

The welfare and safety of the housemates is always our overriding concern, and with that in mind, the production team decided to intervene last night at a point where they felt the confrontation between the housemates had reached an unacceptable level. Our on site security team diffused [sic] the confrontation and the housemates were calmed down and sent to bed. The Big Brother production team has been talking to all housemates individually over the course of today with a view to sorting out tensions in the house and are closely monitoring them. They will be encouraging the housemates to work through their issues as a group. If they do not feel this is feasible they will consider an alternative course of action to guarantee the welfare of the housemates. As always, professional psychologists are monitoring the situation and are on hand if any of the housemates wish to speak to them. The local police have made enquiries about events in the house last night following a handful of calls from members of the public. At present they have given us no indication of any issues arising from last night's broadcast.

Professor David Wilson, a criminologist working as a consultant on the series, decided to leave Big Brother.

On 19 June, two days after the incident, Hertfordshire Constabulary released a joint statement with Channel 4 and Endemol, noting that they were "happy with the steps that Channel 4 and Endemol have taken since [the incident] to guarantee the safety of the housemates".

Media regulator Ofcom received over 1000 complaints from viewers about the incident. After conducting an investigation, they concluded that the highlights show had been "appropriately edited and scheduled", and had therefore not breached the Broadcasting Code. However, they also concluded that the live streaming of the event had breached the Code. They opined that "Channel 4 was continuing to treat as entertainment, a situation that had, from what viewers could see, become serious", and "the intensity and repetition of verbal and physical violence exceeded viewers’ expectations".

On the same day as Ofcom's adjudication was published, Channel 4 responded, stating: "The producers at the Elstree studio were very confident that the situation in the house was under their control [...] they decided that the events in the house should be relayed to viewers until the shouting had abated to reassure viewers that the outcome was not as bad as they might otherwise have imagined. Ofcom took a different view and we must accept their decision."

The fight was later spoofed on the MTV series TRL, during which Emma, Marco, Vanessa, and Victor were present.

== Legacy ==
Since their appearance on Big Brother 5, numerous housemates have gone on to appear in later editions of the programme. Housemates Kitten, Marco, and Victor all appeared on the spin-off series Big Brother Panto in 2004, along with housemates from the previous four editions. Housemate Michelle later appeared on Big Brother 10 to participate in a task celebrating ten years of the programme. Housemates Nádia, Michelle, and Victor were all official housemates on Ultimate Big Brother in 2010, with Nádia and Michelle being the third and fourth evicted housemates, respectively. Victor made it to the finale of the season, where he came in fourth place. Housemates Ahmed and Marco both made appearances in that series, though they were not competing to win.
