= Acorralados =

- No. of days: 99
- No. of housemates: 16
- Winner: Nagore Robles
- Runner-up: Raquel Bollo
- No. of episodes: 15

Release
- Original network: Official web
- Original release: 15 September – 22 December 2011

Acorralados (English: Corralled) is the third Spanish season of The Farm. This season aired on Telecinco after the two first seasons were aired on Antena 3 under the name La Granja, being the actual format its spin-off. The season began on 15 September 2011, taking over from Supervivientes 2011. Magnolia TV España bought the format from Strix. The hosts were Jorge Javier Vázquez, at the central studio in Madrid, and Raquel Sánchez Silva, from the farm. The Farm was located in a 30 inhabitants mountain village named Lodeña, in Asturias.

== Acorralados (2011) ==
=== Contestants ===
Contestants	Hometown	Known for being	Final position
Nagore Robles	Basauri	Gran Hermano 11 housemate	Winner
Raquel Bollo	Sevilla	TV personality, Chiquetete widow	Runner-up
Blanca de Borbón	Oviedo	Alfonso XIII illegitimate granddaughter	Third Place
Regina Do Santos	Rio de Janeiro	Singer and dancer	1st and 14th Evicted
Liberto López de la Franca	Ciudad Real	Las joyas de la corona teacher	13th Evicted
M.ª Ángeles Delgado	Valladolid	Aída Nízar mother	8th and 12th Evicted
Úrsula Aguilar	Málaga	Miss Málaga 2009	11th Evicted
Álvaro Muñoz Escassi	Sevilla	Horse rider and polo player	10th Evicted
Pedro Reche	Langreo	MYHYV star	9th Evicted
El Dioni	Madrid	Armored car robber	Ejected
Antonio David Flores	Málaga	Rocío Jurado ex-son-in-law	7th Evicted
Raúl Hidalgo	Valladolid	Actor and TV host	6th Evicted
Leticia Sabater	Barcelona	TV host	5th Evicted
Brenda Cerdá	Valencia	MYHYV star	4th Evicted
Sonia Baby	Elche	Porn actress	3rd Evicted
Bárbara Rey	Totana	Former vedette and actress	2nd Evicted

=== Nominations ===
	Week 1	Week 2	Week 3	Week 4	Week 5	Week 6	Week 7	Week 8	Week 9	Week 10	Week 11	Week 12	Week 13	Week 14	Finale	
Nagore	Regina	Leticia	M.ª Ángeles	Raúl	Leticia	Blanca	Dioni	Dioni	Liberto	Úrsula	Liberto	M.ª Ángeles	Liberto; Regina	Regina	Nominated	Winner (Day 99)
Raquel	Not in the farm				Leticia	Raúl	Dioni	Dioni	Liberto	Úrsula	Regina	Liberto	Liberto	Regina	Finalist	Runner-up (Day 99)
Blanca	Regina	Bárbara	Sonia	M.ª Ángeles	Dioni	Nagore	Dioni	Dioni	Liberto	Liberto	Úrsula	M.ª Ángeles	Liberto	Raquel	Nominated	Third Place (Day 99)
Regina	Brenda	Evicted (Day 8)					In Forest	Exempt	Úrsula	Álvaro	Úrsula	Raquel	Raquel	Raquel	Nagore	Evicted (Day 99)
Liberto	Not in the farm				Reche	Raúl	Úrsula	Blanca	Úrsula	Álvaro	Nagore	Blanca	Raquel	Evicted (Day 92)		
M.ª Ángeles	Nagore	Bárbara	Blanca	Brenda	A. David	Dioni	A. David	Blanca	Evicted (Day 57)	Exempt	Liberto	Blanca	Evicted (Day 85)		Nagore	-
Úrsula	Not in the farm				Leticia	Raúl	Dioni	Dioni	Liberto	Liberto	Regina	Evicted (Day 78)			Nagore	-
Álvaro	Not in the farm				Raúl	Raúl	M.ª Ángeles	M.ª Ángeles	Regina	Úrsula	Evicted (Day 71)				Nagore	-
Reche	Regina	Bárbara	Sonia	Nagore	Nagore	A. David; Nagore	A. David	Blanca	Úrsula	Evicted (Day 64)					Raquel	-
Dioni	Regina	Bárbara	Sonia	Brenda	Nagore	Raúl	A. David	Blanca	Úrsula	Ejected (Day 64)					Nagore	-
A. David	Nagore	Bárbara	Sonia	Blanca	Raúl	Blanca	Dioni	Evicted (Day 50)							Nagore	-
Raúl	Regina	Bárbara	Sonia	Brenda	Nagore	Reche	Evicted (Day 43)								Raquel	-
Leticia	Brenda	Nagore	Blanca	M.ª Ángeles	A. David	Evicted (Day 36)	In Forest	Re-evicted (Day 50)							Nagore	-
Brenda	Regina	Blanca	M.ª Ángeles	M.ª Ángeles	Evicted (Day 29)											
Sonia	Brenda	Blanca; Nagore	Blanca	Evicted (Day 22)			In Forest	Re-evicted (Day 50)							Raquel	-
Bárbara	Brenda; Blanca	Blanca	Evicted (Day 15)												Raquel	-
Notes	^{1}	^{2}	^{3}	^{4}	^{5}	^{6}	^{7}	^{8}	^{9}, ^{10}	^{11}, ^{12}	^{13}	-	^{14}	None	^{15}	None
Nominated	Blanca; Brenda; Regina	Bárbara; Blanca; Nagore	Blanca; M.ª Ángeles; Sonia	Blanca; Brenda; M.ª Ángeles	A. David; Dioni; Leticia; Nagore	A. David; Nagore; Raúl	A. David; Dioni; M.ª Ángeles	Blanca; Dioni; M.ª Ángeles	Liberto; Reche; Regina; Úrsula	Álvaro; Liberto; Úrsula	Liberto; M.ª Ángeles; Regina; Úrsula	Blanca; M.ª Ángeles	Liberto; Regina	Raquel; Regina	Blanca; Nagore	Nagore; Raquel
Evicted	Regina; Most votes to evict	Bárbara; Most votes to evict	Sonia; 80% to evict	Brenda; Most votes to evict	Leticia; Most votes to evict	Raúl; Most votes to evict	A. David; 36,5% to evict	M.ª Ángeles; Most votes to evict	Reche; Most votes to evict	Álvaro; Most votes to evict	Úrsula; Most votes to evict	M.ª Ángeles; Fewest votes to save	Liberto; 49% to save	Regina; Fewest votes to save	Blanca; 42% to save	Raquel; 44% to win
Evicted	Regina; Most votes to evict	Bárbara; Most votes to evict	Sonia; 80% to evict	Brenda; Most votes to evict	Leticia; Most votes to evict	Raúl; Most votes to evict	A. David; 36,5% to evict	M.ª Ángeles; Most votes to evict	Reche; Most votes to evict	Álvaro; Most votes to evict	Úrsula; Most votes to evict	M.ª Ángeles; Fewest votes to save	Liberto; 49% to save	Regina; Fewest votes to save	Blanca; 42% to save	Nagore; 56% to win

Farmhouse Leader
Immune

=== Nominations and eviction notes ===
- Note 1: At the first round of nominations, the male contestants were immune. Mª Ángeles was also immune as she was who lost the duel against Bárbara. There was a tie between Regina and Brenda and Bárbara broke the tie and chose Brenda as first nominee. Brenda was nominated by the female contestants, Regina was nominated by the male contestants and Blanca was nominated by the FarmHouse leader.
- Note 2: At the second round of nominations, the male contestants were immune. Mª Ángeles was also immune as she was who lost the duel against Sonia. There was a tie between Bárbara and Blanca and Sonia broke the tie and chose Blanca as first nominee. Blanca was nominated by the female contestants, Bárbara was nominated by the male contestants and Nagore was nominated by the FarmHouse leader.
- Note 3: At the third round of nominations, the male contestants were immune. Brenda was also immune as she lost the duel against Nagore. Blanca was nominated by the female contestants, Sonia was nominated by the male contestants, and Mª Ángeles was nominated by the FarmHouse leader.
- Note 4: At the fourth round of nominations, Leticia was immune as she was who lost the duel against Antonio David.
- Note 5: Four new contestants arrive to the farm: Liberto, Álvaro, Raquel and Úrsula. At the fifth round of nominations, Mª Ángeles was immune as she lost the duel against Blanca. Dioni was nominated by the farm leader, Antonio David and Nagore by the main contestants. The new contestants nominated Leticia between the three contestants not nominated Leticia, Raúl and Reche.
- Note 6: The sixth round of nominations was to save. As Antonio David and Mª Ángeles did not receive any vote to save, the farm leader, Reche, had to choose the first nominee between them. The four new contestants voted to evict Raúl; he was the second nominee. Finally Reche nominated Nagore as third nominee.
- Note 7: Liberto had 1 extra point as he told information from outside world. Reche was immune as he was who lost the duel against Álvaro.
- Note 8: On day 50, a public vote among Leticia, Regina and Sonia was open to re-enter into the show. Regina won the vote and she was immune that round. Raquel, Liberto and Blanca had one extra point for talking about the outside world. Reche was immune as he was who lost the duel against Álvaro
- Note 9: Reche was automatically nominated because he broke the rules. Dioni was immune as he was who lost the duel against Álvaro.
- Note 10: Dioni was ejected because he suffered health issues and was suggested to leave the show.
- Note 11: To replace Dioni, a public vote was open to choose between Antonio David, Mª Ángeles and Raúl. With 54% of the votes, Mª Ángeles was chosen to re-enter. She entered on day 67.
- Note 12: Regina was immune as she was who failed the duel against Nagore. Nagore had to break the tie between Álvaro, Liberto and Úrsula, she saved Úrsula but later as farmleader she nominated her.
- Note 13: Mª Ángeles was automatically nominated as she revealed information from the outside world. Since this round, the person who loses the duel is not immune anymore.
- Note 14: There was a tie between Liberto and Raquel with 2 votes. Nagore, as farmleader, had to break the tie and she chose Liberto as the first nominee. Then she nominated Regina as the second one.
- Note 15: The three contestants competed in a challenge and Blanca finished in last place so she was the first nominee. The ex-contestants nominated to choose the second nominee; they chose Nagore. Raquel became the first finalist.

== Pesadilla en El Paraíso (2022) ==
=== Contestants ===
Contestants	Known for being	Final position
Víctor Janeiro	Bullfighter	Winner
Beatriz Retamal	Gran Hermano 17 winner	Runner-up
Daniela Requena	Journalist and activist	3rd Place
Iván Molina	Insiders finalist	4th Place
Israel Arroyo	Fortune teller	15th Evicted
Dani García Primo	La Isla de las Tentaciones 2 tempter	14th Evicted
Manuel González	La Isla de las Tentaciones 3 participant	13th Evicted
Danna Ponce	YouTuber and influencer	12th Evicted
Omar Sánchez	Anabel Pantoja ex-boyfriend	11th Evicted
Patricia Pérez "Steisy"	MYHYV star	10th Evicted
Lucía Dominguín Bosé	Businesswoman, Dominguín/Bosè daughter	9th Evicted
Marco Ferri	Model and reality TV star	8th Evicted
Juan Alfonso Milán	Alfonso XIII great-grandson	Quit
Gloria Camila Ortega	TV personality, Rocío Jurado daughter	7th Evicted
Xavier Font	Locomía singer-songwriter	6th Evicted
Raquel Lozano	Gran Hermano 16 contestant	5th Evicted
Marina Ruiz	MYHYV star	4th Evicted
Alyson Eckmann	Radio broadcaster and TV host	3rd Evicted
Nadia Jémez	Influencer, Paco Jémez daughter	Quit
Mónica Hoyos	Actress and TV host	2nd Evicted
Pipi Estrada	Sports journalist	1st Evicted

== Pesadilla en El Paraíso 2 (2023) ==
=== Contestants ===
Contestants	Known for being	Final position
Borja Estrada	Pipi Estrada son	Winner
Tania Déniz	La Isla de las Tentaciones 5 participant	Runner-up
Antonio Montero Vázquez	Paparazzi and Sálvame panelist	3rd Place
Mar López	Reality TV star	7th Evicted
Silvina Magari	Got Talent 7 semifinalist	6th Evicted
María José Galera	Gran Hermano 1 housemate	5th Evicted
Kiko Jiménez	TV personality	4th Evicted
José Antonio Avilés	TV panelist and journalist	3rd Evicted
Maite Galdeano	Gran Hermano 16 housemate	2nd Evicted
Pablo Sebastián	Cine de barrio pianist	Forced walk
Begoña Gutiérrez	Isabel Pantoja former manager	1st Evicted
