= Celebrity Circus =

Celebrity Circus can refer to:

- Celebrity Circus (Australian TV series), the original Celebrity Circus
- Cirque de Celebrité, the United Kingdom version
- Celebrity Circus (American TV series), the American version

== See also ==
- Circus of the Stars
