= Magenta Devine =

British TV presenter and journalist (1957–2019)

- Born: Kim Taylor; 4 November 1957; Hemel Hempstead, England
- Died: 6 March 2019 (aged 61); London, England
- Occupations: Television presenter and journalist
- Years active: 1986–2019
- Notable credit(s): Network 7, Rough Guide, Reportage, Young, Gifted and Broke

Magenta Devine (born Kim Taylor; 4 November 1957 – 6 March 2019) was a British television presenter, journalist and music promoter best known for presenting the travel programme Rough Guide and youth programme Reportage on BBC2 in the 1990s. She later presented Young, Gifted and Broke for ITV.

== Career ==
Devine originally worked for Tony Brainsby, a publicist for Queen, Thin Lizzy and Whitesnake. While still living with boyfriend (ex-Generation X bassist) Tony James, she became the music promoter for James's new band Sigue Sigue Sputnik. She began her television career in 1986 as a presenter of BBC Wales's pop music show Juice. Following her breakup with James, producer Janet Street-Porter booked Devine to be a presenter on Channel 4's youth programme Network 7. She then moved after Street-Porter to BBC2 to present DEF II, of which Rough Guide was a feature before it became a separate programme.

Devine appeared on Richard & Judy in 2004, and on Extreme Celebrity Detox in 2005. Her voice-over work included advertisements for Peugeot, Motorola, Toyota, and Sea France. In 2006, Devine fronted an Office of Fair Trading (OFT) campaign that urged consumers in the travel market to book with a member of Association of British Travel Agents (ABTA). In 2001, she narrated a BBC Four programme, The New Romantics – A Fine Romance, on the New Romantic movement.

Apart from being a television presenter, she also was UN Goodwill Ambassador in 1998, and campaigned for women's rights.

== Later life and death ==
Devine sought treatment in the 1990s for heroin addiction and depression. In 2003, she was declared bankrupt by London's High Court.

Devine died on 6 March 2019, after a short illness for which she was undergoing treatment at a central London hospital. She was 61 years old.

== Television programmes ==
- BBC Wales's pop music show Juice, presenter
- Channel 4's youth programme Network 7 (1987)
- BBC2's DEF II
- BBC2's Rough Guides to the World
- BBC2's Reportage (1988—94)
- Young, Gifted and Broke ITV documentary series
- This Morning with Richard & Judy (1996) interviewee
- Extreme Celebrity Detox (2005)
- BBC Four programme The New Romantics – A Fine Romance (2001) on the New Romantic movement as narrator
- Big Mouth (2005), an aftershow of Big Brother, as guest panellist
