= Maura Currie =

British broadcaster and news announcer

Maura Currie is the Head of Presentation at BBC Scotland and is broadcaster and continuity announcer for BBC Scotland.

Maura Currie (née McManus) joined BBC Scotland in the mid-1990s as a bi-media continuity announcer, working on BBC Radio Scotland reading news bulletins and continuity announcements on BBC Radio Scotland and television continuity and voice overs for BBC One Scotland and BBC Two Scotland.

Previously, she had been a journalist/Head of News at Q96 and a presenter on BBC Two's travel show The Big Trip in the early 1990s as part of Def II

== Personal life and education ==
Born in Paisley, she is married to David Currie and lives in Paisley.

Founder of Speech and Drama Scotland in 2012 and gives drama classes and elocution lessons in the Paisley area. Maura studied Chemical Engineering at the University of Strathclyde and is an Associate of the London College of Music in Speech and Drama and studied Speech and Drama and early adult performances included Steven Moffat's stage musical Knifer as Lizzie (written & directed by Steven Moffat). Her cousin is guitarist Tony McManus.

Narration : the BBC short film on designing the Queen's Commonwealth baton.

== See also ==
- Continuity announcers in the United Kingdom
