= The Big Trip Travel Show =

BBC Two travel show

- Also known as: The Big Trip BBC TWO Travel programme
- Presented by: Brenda Emmanus; Jeff Green; Various
- Country of origin: United Kingdom
- Original language: English
- No. of series: 2
- No. of episodes: 15

Production
- Producers: Nicola Moody; Helen Bullough
- Running time: 30 minutes
- Production company: BBC North

Original release
- Network: BBC Two
- Release: 21 September 1994 – present

The Big Trip is a travel show that was originally broadcast on BBC Two's DEF II strand in 1994. Aimed at the young backpacking viewers and produced by the team responsible for Rough Guide, it was the last series commissioned by Janet Street-Porter. The show was narrated by both Brenda Emmanus, who stepped in to replace comedian Jeff Green for series 1, and then Lisa I'Anson, for series 2. It followed three groups of young presenters who travelled across the United States, Australia and Indonesia and Europe. The travel show ran for seven episodes, and began airing from 21 September 1994.

Following the first series on BBC Two, it returned for a second series in 1995.

Presenters:

- Jeff Green
- Brenda Emmanus
- Lisa I'Anson
- Harry Gibb
- Maura Currie
- Roddy Thompson
- Suzanne Lavery
- Amanda Brady
