= Extreme Celebrity Detox =

British reality television show

Extreme Celebrity Detox is a British reality television show on Channel 4. Fifteen British celebrities were sent to try a range of detox programmes, which aimed to enhance inner peace. The celebrities were split into four groups, where they would try different detox programmes.

The celebrities and detox they tried were:

- Tai chi: Dominik Diamond, Jilly Goolden, Catherine McQueen, Jack Osbourne
- Tao: Brandon Block, Carol Harrison, Rebecca Loos, Normski
- Yoga: James Brown, Magenta Devine, Lisa I'Anson, Rowland Rivron
- Shamanism: Mina Anwar, Jo Guest, Tony Wilson
