= Gran Hermano (Spanish TV series) season 11 =

Gran Hermano
- Season 11
- No. of days: 144
- No. of housemates: 20
- Winner: Ángel Muñoz
- Runner-up: Saray Pereira

Release
- Original network: Telecinco
- Original release: 6 September 2009 – 27 January 2010

Season chronology
- ← Previous; Season 10 Next → Season 12

Gran Hermano 11 launched on September 6, 2009, with the final on January 27, 2010, lasting 144 days, making it the longest season to date. It is the eleventh Spanish edition of the reality franchise Big Brother. Mercedes Milá returned as the main host of the show, also known as the Gala, which consists of both the nominations and the eviction.

The grand prize this season was €50,000 more compared to the last season, totalling €350,000; the second and third prize were €70,000 and €30,000 respectively. One week after the season ended, an All-Stars edition - Gran Hermano: El Reencuentro premiered which featured housemates Arturo and Indhira returning to the house.

In the 2019 season Gran Hermano Dúo, Carolina returned to the house.

== The House ==
As part of the twist for Gran Hermano 11, a secret "Spy House" was built next to the actual house. Eleven housemates entered the main Gran Hermano House on the night of the premiere; six other Housemates entered the Spy House and remained there until further notice, until then, they were immune from nominations and evictions.

On Day 18, three more housemates entered the Spy House.

On Day 46, as the concept of the Spy House ended, all housemates from both houses resided in the Spy House which became the permanent house.

On Day 67, the first seven evicted housemates returned to the main Gran Hermano House for the chance to once again earn housemate status, with three of the evicted housemates vying to win at least one of the three 'vote to save' rounds by the public, the evicted housemates themselves, and the housemates already living in the house by Day 74.

On Day 137, for the final week, the final three housemates moved back into the main house.

== Housemates ==
This season featured many 'firsts' for Gran Hermano including the most housemates entering on premiere night to date, with 17, including the first mother-daughter housemate, a disabled housemate, and a gay couple.

Housemates	Age	Residence	Occupation				
Ángel Muñoz	32	Madrid	Pilates Teacher				
Saray Pereira	27	La Coruña	Works in bingo & casino				
Pilarita Gómez	52	La Coruña	Housewife				
Pilarita Gómez	52	La Coruña	Housewife	Gerardo Prager	38	Madrid	Businessman and bullfighting agent
Tatiana Malyshkina	19	Almería	Hairdresser				
Arturo Requejo	32	Guipúzcoa	Builder				
Siscu Castillo	23	Barcelona	Unemployed				
Siscu Castillo	23	Barcelona	Unemployed	Laura Selva	25	Alicante	Saleswoman
Carolina "Carol" Lavín	29	Cantabria	Saleswoman				
Carolina "Carol" Lavín	29	Cantabria	Saleswoman	Iván Toscano	23	Murcia	Fit basketball player
Indhira Kalvani	23	Málaga	Tourism student				
Carolina Sobe	36	Madrid	Receptionist				
Hans Marcus	41	Madrid	Unemployed				
Melanie Kiwit	23	Tenerife	ADE student and model				
Melanie Kiwit	23	Tenerife	ADE student and model	Juan Carod	28	Zaragoza	Opponent to National Police
Rebeca Perea	28	Granada	Saleswoman	Juan Carod	28	Zaragoza	Opponent to National Police
Rebeca Perea	28	Granada	Saleswoman	Nagore Robles	26	Vizcaya	Fashion Representative
Lis Valenzuela	31	Barcelona	Businesswoman	Nagore Robles	26	Vizcaya	Fashion Representative
Ángela Castro	29	Alicante	Waitress				
Gonzalo Rodríguez	31	Madrid	Production Assistant				

- Rebeca, Nagore, Indhira, Tatiana, Carolina and Saray appeared naked on Interviú (popular magazine that does naked artistic photography to the famous people)
- On February 3, 2010, a week after the season ended, an All Stars edition - Gran Hermano: El Reencuentro premiered which featured Arturo and Indhira returning at the house.
- Tatiana was in Las Joyas de la Corona on 2010.
- Indhira was 'tronista' of Mujeres y Hombres y Viceversa on 2011.
- Saray and Gerardo were on Gran Hermano: El Reencuentro 2011 (All Stars 2011)
- Nagore won Acorralados on 2011 with 56% of the votes. Now she is an adviser of Mujeres y Hombres y Viceversa.
- Arturo was in Supervivientes: Perdidos en Honduras on 2011. He was on ¡Mira quién salta! on 2014.
- Carolina Sobe was on Supervivientes: Perdidos en Honduras on 2014. Now she is an adviser of Mujeres y Hombres y Viceversa.
- Rebeca and Siscu recorded porn movies in Crapulosos.com

=== Ángel ===
Ángel is a male housemate who entered on Day 1 into the Spy House. On Day 1, he was assigned a secret task to pretend he and Lis were in a relationship. On Day 25, during Nagore's eviction, she chose Ángel to enter the main Gran Hermano house. In the principal house, he formed part of the group of the nice ones. On Day 53, the housemates voted for a fellow housemate to win a trip to Peru; Angel won the vote. He had many problems with Hans, Arturo and Gerardo. He had a nice friendship with Tatiana. On Day 143, the final day of Gran Hermano 11, Ángel was named the winner with 78.5% of the winning vote winning the €350,000 grand prize.

=== Ángela ===
Ángela is a female housemate who entered on Day 1 into the Spy House. She is married to female housemate Laura. Initially, Ángela was simply a guest on behalf of Laura on the premiere of the eleventh season but was given the chance to become a housemate by Gran Hermano host Mercedes Milá; on Day 1, Ángela and Laura were told to keep their relationship as a secret. On Day 11, Ángela was ejected from the house as fellow Spy Housemate Lis figured out that Ángela and Laura were indeed a couple. On Day 95, Angela was briefly reunited with Laura after 84 days as an early surprise Christmas present by Gran Hermano.

=== Arturo ===
Arturo is a male housemate who entered on Day 1 in the main Gran Hermano house. In the principal house, he formed part of the group of the nice ones. On Day 39, after being told he survived the fifth eviction of the season, he moved to the Spy House to decide whether Spy Housemates Carol or Carolina should become official/permanent housemates; on Day 46, he was the only housemate to vote for Carol to stay, hence Carol was evicted. He has developed a relationship with Indhira and during the last couple weeks of his stay with Tatiana. He liked Carol. He was confrontational with Nagore, Juan, Gerardo and Ángel. He was evicted on Day 123 with 61.83% of the public vote.

=== Carol ===
Carol is a female housemate who entered on Day 18 in the main Gran Hermano house but quickly moved to the Spy House. On Day 46, she was evicted after receiving the fewest save votes from Arturo, Indhira, Tatiana, and Toscano where she only earned Arturo's vote for the chance to become an official housemate and no longer a Spy Housemate. She received a mixed reaction to heavy boos at the start of her eviction interview particularly due to romancing Arturo. On Day 67, Carol returned to the main Gran Hermano 11 house with previously evicted housemates for another chance to become an official housemate; on Day 74, Carol received the most save votes from the online-public vote to re-enter the house with 37% of the vote. In Week 14, she was nominated for eviction for the first time by the housemates and was evicted on Day 102 with 64.3% of the public vote.

=== Carolina ===
Carolina is a female housemate who entered on Day 18 in the main Gran Hermano house but quickly moved to the Spy House. She met Ángel on Big Brother's selection of game players. On Day 46, she received the most save votes from Indhira, Tatiana, and Toscano to become an official housemate and no longer a Spy Housemate, only losing Arturo's vote. She was a very charismatic person, but she had a few unfortunate comments on cancer. She was making be called "Drag Queen". She was evicted on Day 81 with a 50,3%.

=== Gerardo ===
Gerardo is a male housemate who entered on Day 18 in the main Gran Hermano house but quickly moved to the Spy House. On Day 32, following Rebeca's eviction, she chose Gerardo to move into the main house. On Day 119, it was revealed that he and Saray will take part of a duo Housemate Exchange with the Grande Fratello house in Italy despite being nominated for eviction for the week; he did survive the eviction and celebrated in the Grande Fratello house by jumping into the pool. In Italy, Saray and Gerardo started a relationship. He has received the most nominations and faced the public vote nine times, the most in Gran Hermano history. On Day 137, he was the last evictee before the final with 85.3%. He said that he had managed to be a reserve of another previous edition of Gran Hermano.

=== Gonzalo ===
Gonzalo is a male housemate from Argentina who entered on Day 1 in the main Gran Hermano house. He was one of the leaders of The group of the snubs. On Day 11, he was ejected from the house for aggressive and threatening behavior, particularly towards Pilarita.

=== Hans ===
Hans is a male housemate who entered on Day 1 in the Spy House. On Day 1, he was told of all the secrets that his fellow housemates in the Spy House have been assigned. It has been revealed, and confirmed by his mother, that Hans is a transsexual; this was not revealed to the house though. On Day 11, evicted housemate Pilarita chose Hans to enter the main house. Out of the contest, Lis declared that Saray had ordered her mother to choose Hans. In the principal house he formed a part of the group of the nice ones. During week four, Hans revealed that he is a transsexual, to Saray. After being nominated four times for eviction, he was the eighth housemate evicted on Day 67.

=== Indhira ===
Indhira is a female housemate who entered on Day 1 in the main Gran Hermano house. In the principal house he formed a part of the group of the nice ones. On Day 39, after being told she survived the fifth eviction of the season, she moved to the Spy House to decide whether Spy Housemates Carol or Carolina should become official/permanent housemates; on Day 46, she voted for Carolina to stay in the house, and Carol was evicted. In the early hours of Day 82, Indhira had an argument with Carol (who returned to the house the previous week) which resulted in Indhira throwing a glass full of ice towards her; moments after, she became the first female ever on Gran Hermano to be ejected for aggressive behavior. She developed an on and off relationship with Arturo and was considered a front runner to win.

=== Juan ===
Juan is a male housemate who entered on Day 1 in the main Gran Hermano house. In the principal house he formed a part of the group of the snubs. He was the strategic leader. He was nominated for the fifth eviction and became the fifth evictee on Day 39. On Day 67, he returned to the main Gran Hermano house with other evicted housemates for a chance to become a housemate again; he lost the three rounds of voting and was re-evicted on Day 74. It has been revealed that he has multiple sclerosis.

=== Laura ===
Laura is a female housemate who entered on Day 1 into the Spy House. She is married to fellow female housemate Angela; on Day 1, Ángela and Laura were told to keep their relationship as a secret; on Day 12, Angela was ejected from the house as Lis figured out their secret. On Day 39, following Juan's eviction, he chose Laura to enter the main house. She was best friend of Saray. Eighty-four days after her wife was ejected on Day 95, Laura was briefly reunited with Angela as an early Christmas gift by Gran Hermano. After 102 days in the Gran Hermano house, Laura received enough nominations to face her first public vote for Week 15 and was subsequently evicted on Day 112.

=== Lis ===
Lis is a female housemate who entered on Day 1 into the Spy House. She was assigned a secret task to pretend that she and Angel are in a relationship. She demonstrated to be the good one player and discovered the secret of Ángela and Laura between Days 8 and 11. On the very early hours of Day 12, Lis walked from the Spy House, mainly after a confrontation by Laura and being shunned by her fellow Spy Housemates. She stopped being present at the set of the program because she was not comfortable.

=== Melanie ===
Melanie is a female housemate who entered on Day 1 into the main Gran Hermano house. In the principal house he formed a part of the group of the snubs. She was nominated for the first time on the seventh eviction and became the seventh evictee on Day 53. On Day 67, she returned to the main Gran Hermano house with other evicted housemates for a chance to become a housemate again; she lost the three rounds of voting and was re-evicted on Day 74. She was considered by his companions as a silly girl who was manipulated by Nagore.

=== Nagore ===
Nagore is a female housemate who entered on Day 1 into the main Gran Hermano house. She was the leader of the group of the snubs. She had a strong personality. In Week 3, on a group consensus, Nagore was nominated for eviction which garnered rapturous applause from the audience and heard into the house. She was evicted on Day 25 with a mixed to negative reception from the audience and with a Gran Hermano record-breaking 95% of the public vote, breaking Ángela of Gran Hermano 9's 92.7%. Nagore is currently tied with Big Brother 5 Brazil's Aline with the highest eviction percentage ever in the world of Big Brother/Gran Hermano. On Day 67, she returned to the main Gran Hermano house with other evicted housemates for a chance to become a housemate again; she lost the three rounds of voting to re-enter the house and was re-evicted on Day 74, coming in second place in all three rounds.

=== Pilarita ===
Pilarita is a female housemate who entered on Day 1 into the main Gran Hermano House. She is the mother of fellow housemate Saray, who entered the Spy House on Day 1. Both Pilarita and Saray were unaware that they are both living in separate houses as they were separated moments before entering the house. In the principal house he formed a part of the group of the nice ones. She received the most nominations during the first round of nominations along with Indhira and evicted on Day 11. Before properly leaving the house, she entered the Spy House where she was reunited with Saray for a few minutes. Pilarita had to then choose either Spy Housemates Lis or Hans to enter the main house, she chose Hans, and Pilarita was finally free to leave the house. On Day 67, she returned to the main Gran Hermano house with other evicted housemates for a chance to become a housemate again; on Day 74, the official housemates voted for Pilarita to return to the house. In Week 15's nominations, Gran Hermano automatically nominated Pilarita for revealing information from the outside world with Saray. She is the first housemate that had re-entered the house to make it to the final where she ultimately lasted third place earning the €30,000 prize, however, as she did not spend the full 143 days in the house compared to other housemates, she will only receive a proportion of the prize.

=== Rebeca ===
Rebeca is a female housemate who entered on Day 1 into the main Gran Hermano house. She entered the house with her small doll named Rosita. She baptized to both groups of the house as The group of the nice ones and The group of the snubs. She was nominated for the fourth eviction after abandoning all of her old friends (the nice ones) and aligning herself with their nemesis. She was evicted on Day 32 with 92.5% of the eviction vote. On Day 67, she returned to the main Gran Hermano house with other evicted housemates for a chance to become a housemate again; on Day 74, she was re-evicted after losing three rounds of voting for the chance to re-enter.

=== Saray ===
Saray is a female housemate who entered on Day 1 into the Spy House. She is the daughter of fellow housemate Pilarita, who entered in the main Gran Hermano house on Day 1 as well. Saray was told that her mother is an official contestant in Gran Hermano but must keep it a secret as she is in the Spy House. On Day 11, all secrets were suspended and Saray was briefly reunited with her mother who just got evicted moments before. On Day 18, following Siscu's eviction, Saray moved into the main Gran Hermano house. In the principal house he formed a part of the group of the nice ones. On Day 119, it was revealed she will be going to the Grande Fratello house in Italy with Gerardo as part of a duo Housemate Exchange. In Grande Fratello, Saray started a relationship with Gerardo. Saray is the first housemate in Gran Hermano history to never be nominated for the public vote throughout the entire season until the final week. On Day 143, Saray was named the runner-up with 19.6%, losing to Ángel, but winning the €70,000 prize for second place. She said that she had managed to be a reserve of Gran Hermano 9.

=== Siscu ===
Siscu is a male housemate who entered on Day 1 into the main Gran Hermano house. In the principal house he formed a part of the group of the nice ones. He was nominated for the second eviction by Gran Hermano as a disciplinary punishment (a Gran Hermano first) due to an altercation with Gonzalo and became the second person to be evicted by the public vote on Day 18. On Day 67, he returned to the main Gran Hermano house with other evicted housemates for a chance to become a housemate again; on Day 74, he received the most save votes from the evicted housemates to earn official housemate status. He was re-evicted on Day 119, making him the first housemate ever to be evicted twice via the public vote in Gran Hermano history.

=== Tatiana ===
Tatiana is a female housemate originally from Russia, and the youngest housemate this season who entered on Day 1 into the main Gran Hermano house. In the principal house he formed a part of the group of the snubs. In Week 5, she was nominated for eviction for the first time; on Day 39, she was told she survived the eviction and was moved into the Spy House to decide whether Spy Housemates Carol or Carolina should become official/permanent housemates; on Day 46, she voted for Carolina to stay. During the last few couple weeks of her stay, she developed a relationship with Arturo, which some considered to be a downturn to her popularity as she was considered a contender to win following Indhira's ejection. She was evicted on Day 130 with 50% of the three-way public vote.

=== Toscano ===
Toscano is a male housemate who entered on Day 1 into the main Gran Hermano house becoming the first disabled person ever in Gran Hermano. At the age of 16, he suffered a motorcycle accident and was reliant on a wheelchair thereafter. In the principal house he formed a part of the group of the snubs. In Week 5, he was nominated for the first time, by ex-housemate Nagore who voted on behalf of Melanie for 'being false'; on Day 39, he survived the public vote and was moved to the Spy House to decide whether Spy Housemates Carol or Carolina should become official/permanent housemates; on Day 46, he voted for Carolina to stay. He was evicted for 'being false' on Day 88 with 42.4% in a three-way public vote.

== Housemate Exchange ==
On December 17, 2009 (Day 102), it was revealed by host Mercedes Milá that a housemate exchange with another Big Brother country will take place soon. A few days later during El Debate, it was revealed Gran Hermano will exchange two housemates with ItalyGrande Fratello; the decision most likely as the television station that programs the Spanish and Italian versions of Big Brother are owned by the same company, Mediaset. On December 29, during El Debate, it was shown that Italian housemates Carmela and Massimo will take part of the exchange; they arrived in the Gran Hermano house on January 3, 2010 (Day 119), the same day as it was announced that Saray and Gerardo will take their place. Saray and Gerardo arrived into the Grande Fratello house the next evening during the Gala of Grande Fratello and left on January 9. Carmela and Massimo left the Gran Hermano house early January 10 (Day 126); later that night, Saray and Gerardo returned to the Gran Hermano house.

== Nominations ==
	#1	#2	#3	#4	#5	#6	#7	#8	#9	#10	#11	#12	#13	#14	#15	#16	#17	Final		Nominations received
Ángel	In Spy; House			Exempt	Hans; Saray; Indhira	No nominations	Arturo	In Peru	Nagore	Arturo; Indhira; Toscano	Indhira; Arturo; Toscano	Pilarita; Arturo; Siscu	Arturo; Siscu; Saray	Gerardo	Arturo; Pilarita; Saray	Pilarita; Saray; Tatiana	Gerardo; Pilarita	Winner (Day 144)		34
Saray	In Spy; House		Exempt	Rebeca; Juan; Melanie	Melanie; Tatiana	No nominations	Gerardo	Gerardo; Tatiana; Carolina	Pilarita	Tatiana; Carolina; Gerardo	Gerardo; Tatiana; Arturo	Gerardo; Carol; Tatiana	Gerardo; Tatiana; Ángel	Pilarita	Gerardo; Tatiana; Ángel	Tatiana; Ángel; Gerardo	Ángel; Gerardo	Runner-Up (Day 144)		22
Pilarita	Gonzalo; Nagore	Evicted (Day 12)							Siscu	Exempt	Gerardo; Tatiana; Arturo	Ángel; Carol; Gerardo	Nominated	Saray	Ángel; Tatiana; Gerardo	Tatiana; Ángel; Gerardo	Ángel; Gerardo	Third Place (Day 144)		27
Gerardo	Not in House		In Spy; House		Exempt	No nominations	Hans	Hans; Saray; Laura	Nagore	Laura; Saray; Toscano	Arturo; Indhira; Siscu	Siscu; Laura; Saray	Laura; Siscu; Arturo	Ángel	Arturo; Saray; Tatiana	Tatiana; Pilarita; Ángel	Ángel; Pilarita	Evicted (Day 134)		73
Tatiana	Indhira; Pilarita	Arturo; Indhira	Hans	Indhira; Hans; Arturo	Indhira(x5); Saray	Carolina	Gerardo	Hans; Saray; Laura	Nagore	Laura; Saray; Indhira	Toscano; Indhira; Laura	Siscu; Laura; Pilarita	Laura; Siscu; Saray	Arturo	Pilarita; Saray; Gerardo	Pilarita; Gerardo; Saray	Evicted (Day 131)			56
Arturo	Rebeca; Siscu	Nagore; Juan	Nagore	Rebeca; Juan; Melanie	Juan; Melanie; Tatiana	Carol	Ángel	Carolina; Saray; Toscano	Pilarita	Gerardo; Carolina; Tatiana	Gerardo; Ángel; Carol	Ángel; Gerardo; Laura	Ángel; Gerardo; Laura	Saray	Gerardo; Ángel; Pilarita	Evicted (Day 124)				41
Siscu	Pilarita; Indhira	Nagore; Melanie	Evicted (Day 19)						Pilarita	Exempt	Toscano; Gerardo; Carol	Carol; Gerardo; Ángel	Tatiana; Ángel; Gerardo	Arturo	Re-Evicted (Day 120)					23
Laura	In Spy; House					No nominations	Gerardo	Gerardo; Tatiana; Carolina	Pilarita	Gerardo; Carolina; Tatiana	Gerardo; Arturo; Indhira	Gerardo; Tatiana; Siscu	Gerardo; Tatiana; Ángel	Evicted (Day 113)						28
Carol	Not in House		In Spy; House			Spy House: Nominated	Evicted (Day 47)		Repechage (37.1%)	Exempt	Indhira; Toscano; Siscu	Siscu; Pilarita; Arturo	Re-Evicted (Day 103)							15
Toscano	Pilarita; Indhira	Arturo; Indhira	Arturo	Saray; Indhira; Arturo	Juan; Arturo	Carolina	Melanie	Tatiana; Carolina; Gerardo	Pilarita	Carolina; Tatiana; Gerardo	Carol; Siscu; Indhira	Evicted (Day 89)								19
Indhira	Tatiana; Siscu	Nagore; Melanie	Nagore	Rebeca; Juan; Melanie	Melanie; Juan; Tatiana	Carolina	Arturo	Laura; Tatiana; Toscano	Pilarita	Tatiana; Gerardo; Carolina	Carol; Tatiana; Ángel	Ejected (Day 83)								41
Carolina	Not in House		In Spy; House			Spy House: Nominated	Exempt	Hans; Toscano; Laura	Nagore	Laura; Arturo; Toscano	Evicted (Day 82)									19
Hans	In Spy; House	Exempt	Nagore	Rebeca; Juan; Melanie	Melanie to save	No nominations	Gerardo	Gerardo; Carolina; Tatiana	Evicted (Day 68)											16
Melanie	Indhira; Pilarita	Indhira; Arturo	Hans	Indhira; Hans; Arturo	Toscano; Arturo; Saray	No nominations	Indhira	Evicted (Day 54)	Nagore	Re-Evicted (Day 75)										13
Juan	Indhira; Rebeca	Arturo; Indhira	Arturo	Hans; Arturo; Indhira	Melanie to save	Evicted (Day 40)			Nagore	Re-Evicted (Day 75)										15
Rebeca	Tatiana; Nagore	Nagore; Arturo	Nagore	Arturo; Hans; Indhira	Evicted (Day 33)				Siscu	Re-Evicted (Day 75)										15
Nagore	Pilarita; Indhira	Arturo; Indhira	Hans	Evicted (Day 26)					Melanie	Re-Evicted (Day 75)										6
Lis	In Spy; House		Walked (Day 13)																	0
Ángela	In Spy; House	Ejected (Day 12)																		0
Gonzalo	Pilarita; Rebeca	Ejected (Day 12)																		1
Nomination Notes	^{1}	^{2}	^{3}	^{4}	^{5}	^{6}	^{7}	^{8}	^{9}	none	^{10}	none	^{11}	^{12}	none	none	^{13}	^{14}		
Up for eviction	Indhira; Pilarita	Arturo; Indhira; Siscu	Arturo; Hans; Nagore	Hans; Indhira; Rebeca	Arturo; Indhira; Juan; Tatiana; Toscano	Carol; Carolina	Ángel; Arturo; Gerardo; Hans; Indhira; Melanie	Carolina; Gerardo; Hans; Tatiana	Carol; Juan; Melanie; Nagore; Pilarita; Rebeca; Siscu	Carolina; Gerardo; Tatiana	Arturo; Gerardo; ~~Indhira~~; Toscano	Ángel; Carol; Gerardo; Siscu	Ángel; Gerardo; Laura; Pilarita; Tatiana	Ángel; Gerardo; Pilarita; Siscu; Tatiana	Ángel; Arturo; Gerardo; Pilarita	Ángel; Pilarita; Tatiana	Ángel; Gerardo	Ángel; Pilarita; Saray		
Walked	none	Lis	none																	
Ejected	Ángela; Gonzalo	none									Indhira	none								
Evicted	Pilarita; 53.4% to evict	Siscu; 56.3% to evict	Nagore; 95% to evict	Rebeca; 92.5% to evict	Juan; 69.9% to evict	Carol; 1 of 4 votes to save	Melanie; 52.0% to evict	Hans; 49.7% to evict	Juan; Melanie; Nagore; Rebeca to save	Carolina; 50.3% to evict	Toscano; 42.4% to evict	Carol; 64.3% to evict	Laura; 53.45% to evict	Siscu; 41.3% to evict	Arturo; 61.83% to evict	Tatiana; 50% to evict	Gerardo; 85.3% to evict	Pilarita; 1.9% to win	Saray; 19.6% to win	
Evicted	Pilarita; 53.4% to evict	Siscu; 56.3% to evict	Nagore; 95% to evict	Rebeca; 92.5% to evict	Juan; 69.9% to evict	Carol; 1 of 4 votes to save	Melanie; 52.0% to evict	Hans; 49.7% to evict	Juan; Melanie; Nagore; Rebeca to save	Carolina; 50.3% to evict	Toscano; 42.4% to evict	Carol; 64.3% to evict	Laura; 53.45% to evict	Siscu; 41.3% to evict	Arturo; 61.83% to evict	Tatiana; 50% to evict	Gerardo; 85.3% to evict	Ángel; 78.5% to win		

Housemates In Spy House
Nominate/vote to save

=== Notes ===
^1 In week one: Angel, Angela, Hans, Lis, Laura and Saray were hidden in the Spy House so they didn't nominate. Instead, they had to guess who was going to be eliminated the following week (Without knowing the housemates were who were indeed nominated). If they succeed, one of them would pass to the main GH11 house.

^2 In week two: Angel, Laura, Lis, and Saray were in the Spy House and didn't nominate. Siscu was automatically nominated by Gran Hermano (Big Brother) after bad behaviour involving Gonzalo (who was ejected). After being evicted Pilarita had to choose between Hans and Lis to enter the GH11 house. She chose Hans.
^3 In week three: as Angel, Laura, and new housemates Carol, Carolina, and Gerardo are in the Spy House, they are immune from eviction. In the main house, the normal nominations process was voided to stop bloc voting and alliances, and the housemates in the main Gran Hermano house had to nominate 3 people in a group consensus, meaning all housemates must agree on the potential nominees for eviction or else everyone faced eviction. It was decided the three nominees were Arturo, Hans, and Nagore.
^4 In week four: Spy Housemates remain immune; housemates in the main house had to nominate using the points system, using 3, 2, or 1 point on the three housemates they wanted to nominate. The housemates with the most points faced the public vote for eviction.
^5 In week five: the remaining Spy Housemates remain immune; as it was Indhira's birthday, Gran Hermano supplied housemates in the main house with a cake with cards in it. Each card had a different meaning regarding nominations. Some of the cards represented a television meaning the housemates will watch the person with the TV card's nominations (Indhira's card); the universal symbol for women (♀) represented that the housemate had to nominate only two female housemates (Saray) and the male symbol (♂) meant to nominate only two male housemates only (Toscano); the Roman numeral 'VI' represented that the housemate can distribute six points to any housemate(s)in any way possible (Tatiana); the positive sign (+) meaning a vote to save, rather than evict (Angel) while the negative sign (-) was a vote to evict (Arturo); a life raft card meant that the housemate with the card won't nominate but will save one of the nominees once nominations are over (Hans); the joker card represented that the cardholder can choose any other card of his/her choice (Juan, the holder, chose the life raft), Juan and Hans chose to save Melanie; Melanie's card allowed an ex-housemate to nominate on her behalf, she chose Nagore.
^6 As the only remaining Spy Housemates to be living in the Spy House, Carol and Carolina are automatically nominated for eviction. After being told they survived the public vote of week 5 (on Day 39), Arturo, Indhira, Tatiana, and Toscano moved into the Spy House and voted to save either Carol and Carolina to enter the main house.
^7 For the seventh round of nominations, each housemate were allowed to nominate only one housemate. As winning the save vote against Carol on Day 46, hence earning official housemate status, Carolina gained immunity for the week.
^8 The eighth round of nominations did not take place, per usual, during the eviction show on Week 7/Day 53 for next week's show. The following eviction show of Week 8/Day 60 did not feature an eviction but only nominations. In order for housemates to nominate (using 3, 2, and 1 points), housemates must pass through Gran Hermano's House of Horrors, in honor to celebrate the season of Halloween. Angel was exempt from nominations as he won a trip to Peru.
^9 The evicted housemates from the past seven evictions had the chance to return to the house (this does not include the housemates who were ejected or walked), the public will be voting online and the evicted housemate with the highest vote will be re-entering the house on Day 74; the current housemates will be voting for one evicted housemate to return; the still evicted housemates will also vote amongst themselves on who will re-enter the house as well. The public voted for Carol to return with 37% of the save vote; Pilarita received the most save votes from the current housemates, and Siscu won the ex-housemate vote. Juan, Melanie, Nagore, and Rebeca were re-evicted.
^10 As Indhira was ejected on Day 82 and was one of the nominees, the eviction will still take place with the remaining 3 nominees.
^11 For the 13th round of nomination (Day 102), Gran Hermano automatically nominated Pilarita for discussing information from the outside world with Saray. This week's eviction took place three days later due to avoid Christmas.
^12 For the 14th round of nomination (Day 112), housemates had to nominate to save one housemate, instead of the usual nominate to evict.
^13 For the 17th round of nomination (Day 130), housemates had to nominate only two housemates with 2 and 1 points.

^14 For the final round, the public are voting for who they want to win Gran Hermano 11.

== El Debate: Blind Results ==
Gran Hermano presents 'El Debate' on Sunday nights presented by Jordi González, a debate show featuring the latest evictee and special guests; blind results shows the progress of the public vote for the next eviction show but doesn't reveal which housemate has the percentage.

Week	1ºPlace to Evict	2ºPlace to Evict	3ºPlace to Evict	4ºPlace to Evict	5ºPlace to Evict	6ºPlace to Evict
1	61.1%	38.9%				
2	54.5%	32.1%	13.4%			
3	97.2%	2.4%	0.4%			
4	94.2%	4%	1.8%			
5	76.5%	12%	5.2%	4.2%	2.1%	
6	---No Public Voting---					
7	52.9%	30.2%	10.8%	3.7%	1.9%	0.5%
8	---No Public Voting---					
9	60.2%	30%	8.6%	1.2%		
10	---Voted Online---					
11	53.3%	26.3%	20.4%			
12	50.2%	26.3%	23.5%			
13	---No Public Voting---					
14	71%	24%	4.4%	0.6%		
15	68.2%	18.3%	7.8%	3.3%	2.4%	
16	32%	25.9%	24.4%	15.2%	2.5%	
17	75.4%	20.2%	2.4%	2%		
18	64.3%	27.7%	8%			
19	85.4%	14.6%				
Final	N/A%	N/A%	1.7%			

=== Blind Results Notes ===
- ^: Week 6 Week 6 did not include the public vote as the housemates will be doing the evicting between Carol and Carolina.
- ^: Week 8 & 9 The eighth round of nominations took place during week nine, as there we no nominations on week 8.
- ^: Week 10 The public were voting on which ex-housemate should return to the house via online voting, rather than the usual calling or texting.
- ^: Week 12 The eleventh round of nominations consisted of four nominees for eviction, but as Indhira (one of the nominees), was ejected from the house, the public resumed voting with the remaining three nominees.
- ^: Final The public was voting for who they want to win. Only the percentage for 3rd place was revealed; the percentage of the runner-up and winner was not revealed.

== See also ==
- Main Article about the show
