= The Farm (British TV series) =

- Genre: Reality television
- Written by: Les Keen
- Directed by: Alex Rudzinski
- Presented by: Ed Hall (2004); Colin McAllister and Justin Ryan (2005)
- Narrated by: Ed Hall (2004)
- Theme music composer: Bee Gees
- Opening theme: "Stayin' Alive" (instrumental), Bee Gees
- Ending theme: "Stayin' Alive" (instrumental), Bee Gees
- Country of origin: United Kingdom
- Original language: English
- No. of seasons: 2
- No. of episodes: 22

Production
- Executive producer: Louise Rainbow
- Producers: Alex Dundas; Sean Hancock; Colin Whitaker; Debbie Woocock
- Editors: Jennifer Hampson; Joe Pedder; Dave Tilley
- Running time: 55 minutes
- Production company: Endemol UK

Original release
- Network: Five
- Release: 26 September 2004 – 26 May 2005

Related
- Celebs on the Farm

The Farm is the British version of the international TV format The Farm, produced by Strix. The show had a number of celebrities appear on it during its two series run on Five between 2004 and 2005. After the completion of the second series in 2005, Five revealed that they would not be airing any further series of the show.

In 2018, a revamped version of the show titled Celebs on the Farm premiered on 5Star.

== Format ==
In the UK version of The Farm, the show puts a group of celebrities on a farm where they live together for a short period of time. On the farm, the contestants must do typical farmer work involving agriculture and animal rearing. At regular intervals, one of the contestants is evicted from the farm by way of a public telephone vote. This process is continued until only one contestant remains, and then they gain the title of "Top Farmer".

== Series 1 (2004) ==
Series one was announced in the summer of 2004, and eventually went to air from 26 September 2004, presented and narrated by Ed Hall. The show's first series broadcast in a nightly 10pm slot from 26 September to 17 October 2004.

The show's first series caused plenty of controversy for Five when in October 2004 it showed Rebecca Loos masturbating a pig and collecting a semen sample from it. This incident among others also caused outrage from the RSPCA.

The winner of the show by viewers' votes was Jeff Brazier.

The celebrities that took part were:

Celebrity	Known for	Status
Stan Collymore	Footballer	Walked
Paul Daniels	Magician	Walked
Lady Victoria Hervey	Socialite	Eliminated 1st
Terry Christian	Television presenter	Eliminated 2nd
Ritchie Neville	5ive singer	Eliminated 3rd
Margi Clarke	Former Coronation Street actress	Eliminated 4th
Debbie McGee	Magician's assistant	Eliminated 5th
Rebecca Loos	Model	Third place
Vanilla Ice	Rapper	Runner-up
Jeff Brazier	Television presenter	Winner

== Series 2 (2005) ==
Series two was announced soon after the completion of the first series. The second series aired from 9 May 2005 for a total of eighteen days, and was now presented by Colin McAllister and Justin Ryan. The show's second and final series was broadcast in a nightly 10.30pm slot (half-an-hour later than the timeslot during the first series) between 9 May and 26 May 2005.

The winner of the show by viewer's votes was Keith Harris and Orville the Duck.

The celebrities that took part were:

Celebrity	Known for	Status
Ilona Staller	Pornographic actress	Eliminated 1st
Charlene Tilton	Dallas actress	Eliminated 2nd
Flavor Flav	Rapper	Eliminated 3rd
Lionel Blair	Dancer & television presenter	Eliminated 4th
Emma B	Model	Eliminated 5th
Ron Jeremy	Pornographic actor	Eliminated 6th
Dave Morgan	Jessie Wallace's ex-boyfriend	Eliminated 7th
Emma Noble	Model	Third place
Mikey Green	Phixx singer	Runner-up
Keith Harris & Orville the Duck	Ventriloquist & dummy	Winner

== Ratings ==
The show's first episode managed 1.16 million viewers for Five, and overall, the first series was a success for the Channel, managing an average of 1.4 million viewers in its 10pm nightly timeslot. The first series received an increase in viewers thanks to the incident involving Rebecca Loos, and for the series one finale scored a peak of nearly 2.3 million viewers, and a 15.2% audience share for Five.

The show's second series began in May 2005 with a new nightly timeslot of 10.30pm, with the first episode taking 1.17 million viewers and a 9.2% audience share. The second series did not rate as well as the first however, and overall managed an average of 1.19 million viewers in its timeslot.
