= Network 7 =

- Network 7 logo from Series 2
- Created by: Jane Hewland, Janet Street-Porter
- Directed by: Matt Forrest, Andrew Gillman
- Presented by: Magenta Devine, Sankha Guha, Tracey MacLeod
- Country of origin: United Kingdom
- Original language: English
- No. of series: 2
- No. of episodes: 44

Production
- Executive producers: Keith MacMillan, Jane Hewland
- Producer: Janet Street-Porter
- Editor: Charles Parsons
- Running time: 2 hours

Original release
- Network: Channel 4
- Release: 3 May 1987 – 23 October 1988

Network 7 is a short-lived but influential youth music and current affairs programme screened on Channel 4 over two series in 1987 and 1988. The series was created by Jane Hewland and Janet Street-Porter, who was also editor of the first series.

== Overview ==
Network 7 broadcast live on Sundays from noon until two o'clock and was conceived of as a 'channel within a channel', something young people could roll out of bed and watch the morning after the night before. Its mission statement was "News is Entertainment. Entertainment is News." It was known for its heavily self-branded, frenetic visual style with wild camera work, rapid cuts, very short items and "blipverts" — a dense combination of innovative graphics, and pop video style visuals explaining everything from Third World debt to bulimia.

Much of Network 7's innovative style can be seen as being inspired by a combination of elements such as the aesthetic of the Max Headroom drama 20 Minutes into the Future and the studio-based anarchy of Tiswas. The show's logo and distinctive brand and graphics (that predicted a desktop computer style) were designed by Malcolm Garrett and Kasper de Graaf's design studio Assorted iMaGes.

The show took place in a specially built 'caravan city' in Limehouse Studios, a deserted banana warehouse on the site of what is now One Canada Square. Presenters included Jaswinder Bancil, Magenta Devine, Sankha Guha, Eric Harwood, Murray Boland, Tracey MacLeod, Sebastian Scott, John Holdsworth, Caroline Roberts, Caroline Hanson, Lisa Clark, Ali Jack, Lindsey MacRae, and Trevor Ward. Most presenters had previously worked in either television or journalism in a smaller capacity, but they all got their first major TV exposure on the show. Charlie Parsons was a presenter and also part of the production staff. He later set up the production company Planet 24, which produced The Word and The Big Breakfast with his partner Waheed Alli.

One feature produced by Parsons titled "The Castaways" featured four people marooned on an island in Sri Lanka for two weeks. This feature would become the basis of the long-running reality franchise Survivor. The first version of Survivor debuted in Sweden in September 1997 as Expedition Robinson, while the American version of Survivor debuted in 2000 and became the flagship version of franchise, airing 50 seasons as of 2026. The series was less successful in its British adaptation, with its 2001 iteration for ITV lasting only two seasons and its 2023 iterations for the BBC lasting one season.

Network 7 challenged the idea that youth programming could only be a niche concern in the television business. The series won a British Academy Television Award for Originality for Hewland and Street-Porter in 1987. The series has been credited with changing the language of factual television.

== Regular programme segments ==
Flesh + Blood was a mini-series running each week for 14 minutes within Network 7, written by Joanna Hogg and featuring Vladek Sheybal and Diana Quick in the main roles.

Dick Spanner, P.I. was a 6-minute Gerry Anderson claymation detective serial shown weekly during Series 1.

Room 113 was a pre-recorded one-to one psychological celebrity interview conducted by Oliver James.

True or False showed a pre-recorded bizarre real-life story, and the following week revealed whether the story was true or false. In Series 2 viewers could voice their guesses via a phone poll.

Film On 7 showed a short one-minute film made by students at London International Film School.

== Memorable moments ==
The series premiered with a feature on cloning cashcards, where presenter Sankha Guha cloned a card and used it on live television to take money out of an ATM outside the Bank of England, going in depth on how it was done using a video recorder and strips of tape.

It broadcast a secular gay wedding ceremony, organised by Gay Humanist Group (now part of Humanists UK) which provoked reaction at the time from the British press.

One episode aired a live satellite link-up to Ed Byrne, an American man on death row, due to him being convicted of murdering his girlfriend. Viewers voted whether they thought he deserved to live or die, and a presenter revealed the results to him at the end of the show.

== See also ==
- DEF II
- Reportage
