= Outback Jack =

US television program

Production
- Production location: TCN-9 Willoughby, New South Wales

Original release
- Network: Nine Network

Outback Jack is a 2004 American reality television series filmed in the Outback of Australia. It was produced by Nash Entertainment. It starred Vadim Dale, a 6-foot-tall former underwear model, as Outback Jack, and started with twelve women who vied for Dale's attentions to be selected as the woman he would choose to be with. The show first aired on the TBS network and was hosted by JD Roberto. Outback Jack's first episode featured the twelve contestants getting out of limousines and lining up outside a mansion in the U.S., thinking they were about to be a part of a show similar to The Bachelor, only to be told by the host that "their man" was waiting for them in Australia. The dozen were shocked again, upon arriving in Australia, to find out that they would be competing in the Outback and that they would have to parachute out of planes to get to their destination. Dale has since relocated to Louisville, Kentucky to be with Natalie Franzman, his co-star and the winning contestant on Outback Jack. The two were married on October 22, 2005 and also featured on Celebrity Circus, which was shown on Australia's Nine Network (who also broadcast Outback Jack). Dale, now an officer with the Louisville Metro Police Department, and Natalie have three daughters, born between 2006 and 2010. Dale was also a CLEO magazine centerfold. WWE wrestler Maria Kanellis and Cortney Owen, the current wife of NASCAR driver Johnny Sauter were contestants on the show.
