= Raquel Bollo =

Spanish television personality, business woman and model

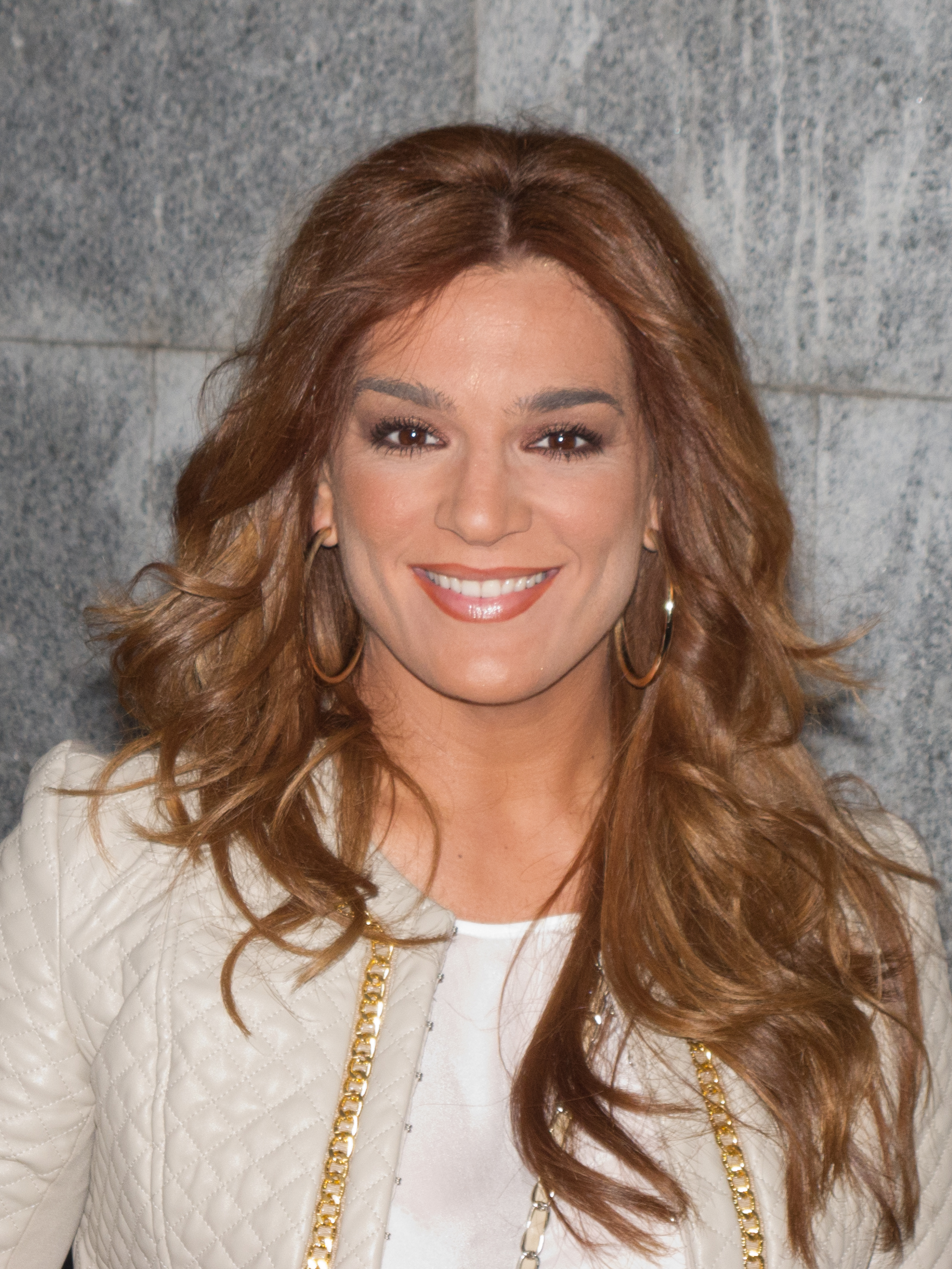
- Born: Raquel Bollo Dorado; 4 November 1975 (age 50); Seville, Spain
- Occupation: Television personality
- Writing career
- Years active: 2002–present

Raquel Bollo Dorado, better known as Raquel Bollo (born 4 November 1975 in Seville) is a Spanish television personality, businesswoman and model. She appears in the long-running programs Sálvame and Sálvame Deluxe on Telecinco.

== Early fame ==
She was born in Seville, in 1975. She became famous in 1995 after marrying the singer Chiquetete. From the very beginning she appeared on the cover of major gossip magazines in Spain, in which she gave interviews about her private life. She also appeared on several television programs such as Corazón, corazón and Crónicas marcianas.

In 2004, she began to appear on several Telecinco programs such as A tu lado, La Noria and currently on Sálvame Diario and Deluxe.

In addition to working in television, she has competed in several reality shows from Telecinco: in 2007, she was the fifth runner-up of Survivor Spain; in 2011, she was proclaimed the second runner-up of Acorralados; and in 2016, she was a housemate on the Spanish version of Celebrity Big Brother: Gran Hermano VIP 4. After spending 35 days in the house, Raquel Bollo said she wanted to leave after realizing she wished to reunite with her former daughter-in-law Aguasantas Vilches, who she does not get along well with. She was finally convinced to stay.

Raquel is also the owner of a boutique store in Seville, in which she has worked with several models and done charitable projects.

== Personal life ==
She married singer Chiquetete in Seville (1995–2003), with whom she had two children, Manuel and Alma. They divorced because Raquel alleged the singer abused her. Later on, she had another relationship in which she gave birth to her third child, Samuel.

Thanks to her marriage to Chiquetete, she became close friends with his cousin Isabel Pantoja, who is godmother to her daughter Alma.

In 2014, her son Manuel Cortés had a controversial love relationship with Aguasantas Vilches. It was rumoured that Raquel influenced her son to end this relationship.

== TV ==
- A tu lado (2002–2007), Telecinco.
- La Noria (2007–2012), Telecinco.
- Survivor (2007), Telecinco (5th place).
- Sálvame diario (2009–2016), Telecinco.
- Sálvame Deluxe (2009–2016), Telecinco.
- Acorralados (2011), Telecinco (Runner-up).
- Gran Hermano VIP 4 (2016), Telecinco (8th place).
- Viva la vida (2018), Telecinco.
- Ven a cenar conmigo: Summer Edition (2018), Cuatro (4th place).
- Sálvame diario (2018–present), Telecinco.
