= Emma B (model) =

British model

- Born: Emma Blocksage; 28 April 1979 (age 47); Hastings, East Sussex, England
- Occupations: Glamour model; television personality
- Modeling information
- Hair color: Blonde

Emma Blocksage (born 6 September 1980) is an English model and television personality. She has modeled for fashion magazines Vogue and Elle and fashion houses Chanel and Prada. On television, she has presented for ITV2, the Disney Channel and MTV.

== Modeling career ==
Blocksage was spotted at about the time of her 15th birthday in April 1994 by Hastings model agent Martin Robinson in Bexhill's De La Warr Pavilion when she entered a modelling contest co-sponsored by his agency, Martin Enterprises—Studio 17.

Before the event had started, Martin Robinson saw her walking through the foyer and stated, "One day she will be a supermodel". Having contacted Elite Model Management, she subsequently won their "Look of the Year" in July 1995 at the age of 16. The win was followed by a modelling contract with Elite, resulting in the young model, now known as Emma B, beginning a career in the industry.

As a fashion model, Emma B appeared in catwalk shows and ad campaigns for Chanel, Prada, Valentino, Guess?, Dior, Jean Paul Gaultier, Westwood, Hamnett, and Bella Freud.

Her image has been on the covers of Vogue, Elle, Harper's Bazaar, Marie Claire and numerous others, while a lingerie contract with Debenhams featured her as their "lingerie face" for two years.

As a result of her popularity, she became a "name" model, appearing regularly in such publications as FHM, Stuff, Maxim, Front, GQ, News of the World, Daily Star, The Sun, Closer, Nuts, Zoo and Donna.

In 2003, her calendar hit the top 5 best selling calendars for the year and sold out in all major outlets.

She is currently a model for the Ann Summers chain of shops and, in 2004, she was signed by record label Warner Bros. and had a top 20 hit in the charts.

In 2012, Blocksage kicked off her bodybuilding career winning the bikini category at the UKBFF MuscleTalk Championships.

== Television career ==
In 2004, after taking a break from the limelight to spend time with her mother and sister in Hastings, Emma B returned to the media spotlight. As her popularity had risen with modelling, other media projects became available, including a recording contract with East West Records. She has presented for ITV2 (The Mix, Flying Start), Sky One (Babes Behaving Badly, Celebrity Fear Factor UK), the Disney Channel and MTV. She made her acting debut in Channel 4's It's a Girl Thing, and her own fly-on-the-wall reality TV show Young, Hot and Talented.

After being lined up to star with then-lover, East 17 singer Brian Harvey in ITV1's summer 2004 version of I'm a Celebrity... Get Me Out of Here!, she took part in ITV1 reality TV flop Celebrity Wrestling. She also participated in Five's celebrity reality show The Farm, was the runner up in Sky One's Cirque de Celebrité in 2006 and has appeared on ITV Play's phone-in quiz show The Mint.

She took part in the second series of Channel 4's Celebrity Coach Trip which aired in October 2011. She also took part in BBC's Snog Marry Avoid?.

== Personal life ==
Blocksage is the mother of two sons and is married to Ollie Oxley.
