= Rebecca Loos =

Dutch media personality (born 1977)

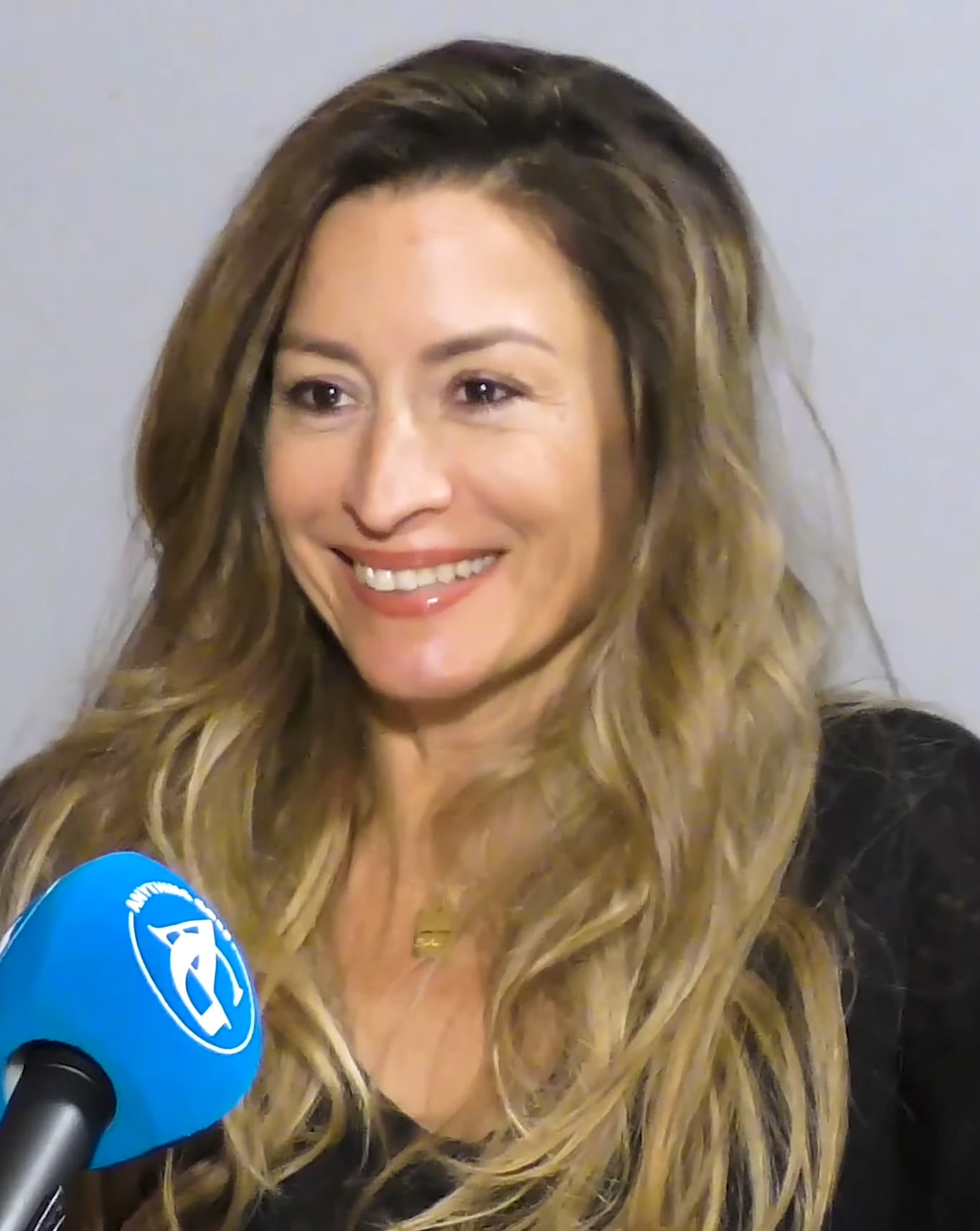
- Loos in 2024
- Born: Rebecca Loos Bartholdi; 19 June 1977 (age 49); Madrid, Spain
- Citizenship: Dutch
- Occupations: Yoga teacher; massage therapist; television personality; model; assistant
- Television: Celebrity Love Island; The Farm; Extreme Celebrity Detox; Temptation Island; The X Factor: Battle of the Stars "Celebrity SAS: Who Dares Wins
- Spouse: Sven Christjar Skai (m. 2012)
- Children: 2
- Relatives: Piers Morgan (second cousin)
- Website: rebeccaloos.com

Rebecca Loos (born 19 June 1977) is a Dutch former glamour model and media personality. She first came to public attention following her claims that she had conducted an affair with the married footballer David Beckham while she was employed as his personal assistant. The allegations led to Loos appearing on several reality television series, magazine covers, and in other media for a few years thereafter.

== Early life, family and education ==
Loos was born in Madrid, Spain. Her father, Leonard Loos Bartholdi, was a Dutch diplomat, and her mother, Elizabeth Loos, is originally from Surrey, England. Loos was privately educated at Runnymede College in Madrid. She is a second cousin of Piers Morgan, who was editor of the Daily Mirror tabloid newspaper when Loos initially gained media attention.

== Career ==
Loos became the personal assistant to former England national football team captain David Beckham when he transferred to Real Madrid in July 2003. Her employment was terminated a few months later, and Loos subsequently gave an interview to the British tabloid newspaper News of the World in April 2004, alleging that she and Beckham had conducted a four-month affair whilst he was married to his wife Victoria. The claims were never corroborated and were dismissed by Beckham as "ludicrous", although he did not mount a legal challenge to the story.

Shortly after the newspaper coverage of her alleged affair with Beckham, Loos commenced a career as a media personality. In 2004, she briefly appeared as a hostess on the Dutch TV programme Shownieuws. In October 2004, Loos made an appearance on the controversial reality television programme The Farm on Channel 5. The RSPCA accused producers of pandering to a "morbid and sordid fascination with farm animals", while PETA and Mediawatch-UK demanded the show be taken off the air.

In 2005, Loos appeared on the ITV reality show Celebrity Love Island. The same year, Loos took part in a staged wedding ceremony with American fashion model Jenny Shimizu for the television programme Power Lesbian UK to protest against America's laws on same-sex marriage. It was broadcast in the United States as Power Lesbians on Logo TV. The two had a relationship for a period thereafter. Loos has stated that she is bisexual and "has been ever since [she] was a teenager."

Loos played for the England Women's football team in a Sky charity event in 2006. In April that same year, she also ran the London Marathon and raised more than £7,000 in sponsorship for the British Red Cross. Later, in May, Loos appeared on The X Factor: Battle of the Stars alongside James Hewitt in which she received a negative reception from judge Sharon Osbourne.

Loos was a contestant on Supervivientes 2007, in which she came third. In November of that year, she appeared in Sky TV's Cirque de Celebrité in which she was one of two new contestants introduced midway through the series.

In 2008, Loos was a guest on The Podge and Rodge Show. In September, she had a part in a Dutch feature film, Mijn vader is een Detective (My Father is a Detective). In October, she took part in the Dutch version of 71 Degrees North (71 Graden Noord). She posted on her website that she has been working as a yoga teacher and massage therapist.

Loos has been featured on the covers of Playboy, FHM, Nuts, Zoo Weekly and other men's magazines and lad mags.

In July 2025, Loos was named in the line-up for Celebrity SAS: Who Dares Wins.

== Personal life ==
As her father was a Dutch diplomat, Loos is a Dutch citizen.

She met her future husband, Norwegian doctor Sven Christjar Skaiaa, while she was filming 71 Graden Noord. After becoming pregnant, she relocated to Norway in 2009 and has only made occasional media appearances since then. Loos has stated on her official website that she is mother to two sons.

== Notable media appearances ==
- 2004 – Hostess on Dutch television show Shownieuws
- October 2004 – Participant on The Farm
- 2004 – Extreme Celebrity Detox for Channel 4
- February–April 2005 (on screen) – Dream Team, a Sky football-based TV series. Recurring role of Naomi Wyatt, a sports psychologist
- Summer 2005 – Participant on the ITV reality show Celebrity Love Island
- Autumn 2005 – Hostess of the TV documentary Power Lesbian UK for Logo TV
- January 2006 – Celebrity model in the Dutch edition of Playboy magazine
- April 2006 – Participant in the Belgian/Dutch version of the reality show Temptation Island
- April 2006 – England team member in Sky 1's Celebrity World Cup Soccer Tournament (losing 2–1 to Brazil in the final).
- May 2006 – Contestant on The X Factor: Battle of the Stars, singing along with James Hewitt
- February 2007 – Appeared on New Zealand's reality TV show Treasure Island: Pirates of the Pacific
- May 2007 – Contestant on Supervivientes, in which she came third
- November 2007 – Contestant on Sky TV's Cirque de Celebrité. Loos was voted out by the public after just a week.
- 8–9 December 2008 – Guest host of television's The Podge and Rodge Show
