= Vadim Dale =

Australian television personality (born 1976)

Vadim Dale (born 19 January 1976) is an Australian-American policeman and former reality television personality. He was featured on the 2004 American reality television dating show Outback Jack, where he met his wife, Natalie. In 2005, he relocated to Natalie's hometown of Louisville, Kentucky, where he joined the Louisville Metro Police Department.

In 2018, he left the department to become a corporate spokesperson. However, by 2020, he had joined the police department in nearby St. Matthews, Kentucky. He was interviewed by the Sydney Morning Herald in 2020 during the George Floyd protests.

== Background ==
Dale was born to an Italian mother and Australian father in Melbourne, Australia. His older brother, Eden, died in 1980 from heart disease complications. Shortly after, Dale attended Geelong Grammar School as a boarder. Developing a keen interest in adventure and the outdoors, he became known for his all-around athletic ability, winning medals in multiple sporting events, including swimming and horse riding.

== Career ==
Dale spent many of his younger years traveling the world, including living in Italy for several years with his mother's side of the family. In 2000, Dale traveled to Nepal embarking on a 6-month expedition hiking through the Himalayas, ultimately summiting several peaks. In 2003, Turner Broadcasting Station (TBS) came to Australia and announced a nationwide search for an outdoorsman to star in a big-budget reality TV show (Outback Jack) to be filmed on location in the Australian Outback. A friend of Dale's submitted an application on his behalf without telling him. After initial hesitation, Dale was convinced to take part as the star.

Following his appearance on Outback Jack, he moved to Louisville, Kentucky and married the contestant he fell in love with on the show, Natalie Franzman, in September 2005.

Dale was chosen by People Magazine as one of their 50 Hottest Bachelors and was also featured in the 2007 issue of "The Worlds Hottest Men." He appeared on several TV shows worldwide: Miss Popularity, and Treasure Island on which he and his wife, Natalie, came in third place. He has been a guest host on other Australian TV shows, including Celebrity Circus, in which Dale starred, StarStruck, The Great Outdoors and Getaway.

During Outback Jack, Dale toured the United States promoting the show for the network and was featured on several US talk shows, among them Live with Regis and Kelly, Good Morning America, and Jimmy Kimmel Live!

After Dale and his wife settled in Louisville, he trained two German Shepherds as search and rescue dogs, and eventually began working with his dogs for FEMA and other agencies at crime scenes alongside police officers. This sparked an interest in police work, and he entered the academy of the Louisville Metro Police Department in November 2009, graduating and becoming an officer in June 2010. He and his wife have three daughters, the youngest of whom was born while he was in the academy.

On 17 May 2012, Dale was involved in a shooting. Dale was working a crime scene at an earlier quadruple shooting at the intersection of 32nd and Kentucky streets that left four men dead and several others wounded. An armed woman, Cheetara Goldsmith, shot and killed another woman, Makeba Lee, nearby. Dale shot Goldsmith after she refused to comply with police commands to drop the gun, and pointed it towards police. The shooting was determined by the district attorney to be "justified as self‐defense as well as defense of others." Goldsmith was later convicted of murder and sentenced to 25 years in prison.

Dale received the LMPD Distinguished Lifesaving Award at the department's 2012 awards banquet. He received the award for saving his young daughter's life performing CPR on her after she suffered a seizure just before Christmas 2011.

In 2014, Dale joined the LMPD SWAT Unit while also serving on the VIPER Unit. In early 2015, Dale joined the United States Marshal Service as a Fugitive Task Force officer. After several years with the US Marshals Service, Dale returned to Louisville Metro Police and was appointed as police spokesman by the Chief of Police. He also assisted the Louisville Metro Police Training Division with training recruits in advanced driving skills, pursuit driving and evasive driving.
