= Supervivientes: Perdidos en Honduras (2007) =

- Season 2
- Presented by: Jesús Vázquez
- No. of days: 71
- No. of castaways: 13
- Winner: Nilo Manrique
- Location: Cayos Cochinos, Honduras
- No. of episodes: 11

Release
- Original network: Telecinco
- Original release: April 19 – June 28, 2007

Season chronology
- ← Previous; Perdidos en el Caribe Next → Perdidos en Honduras

Supervivientes: Perdidos en el Honduras is the second season of Supervivientes and the eighth overall season of Survivor to air in Spain. This season was filmed in Cayo Paloma, Honduras.

Jesús Vázquez was the host of the main show this season, with Mario Picazo doing daily summaries from the island with the contestants from Monday to Friday at 17.45, and Lucia Riaño presenting the debate Sunday at midnight. The show was broadcast from April 19, 2007 to June 28, 2007.

The main twist this season was that of the "Judas Kiss", which gave an eliminated contestant the right to vote at the tribal council immediately following their elimination. Ultimately, it was Nilo Manrique who won this season over Juanito Oiarzabal and Rebecca Loos.

== Finishing order ==
Contestant	Famous for being	Finish
Ángela Bustillo; 22, Cantabria	Miss Cantabria 2007	Evacuated; Day 7
Chiqui Martí; 35, Barcelona	Pole dancer	1st Voted Out; Day 7
Pedro Oliva; 38, Zaragoza	Gran Hermano 4 winner	2nd Voted Out; Day 14
Elizabeth Thompson; Havana	Model	3rd Voted Out; Day 21
Sofía Cristo; 23, Madrid	Bárbara Rey's daughter	4th Voted Out; Day 28
Valerio Pino; 25, Calabria	Model & dancer	5th Voted Out; Day 35
Teresa Martín; 26, Málaga	Miss Málaga 2003	6th Voted Out; Day 42
Carlo Constanzia; 41, Cosenza/Madrid	Aristocrat	7th Voted Out; Day 49
Raquel Bollo; 37, Seville	Television personality	8th Voted Out; Day 56
Javián Antón; 32, Seville	Operación Triunfo 2001 contestant	9th Voted Out; Day 63
Rebecca Loos; 30, Madrid	David Beckham's ex-lover	Third Place; Day 70
Juanito Oiarzabal; 51, Gasteiz	Mountaineer	Runner-Up; Day 70
Nilo Manrique; 38, Cuba/Valencia	Isabel Gemio's ex-husband	Sole Survivor; Day 70

== Nominations table ==
	Week 1	Week 2	Week 3	Week 4	Week 5	Week 6	Week 7	Week 8	Week 9	Final	Total votes
Nilo	Chiqui	Raquel	Juan	Javián	Valerio	Juan	Javián	Rebecca	Finalist	Sole Survivor (Day 70)	1
Juan	Rebecca	Valerio	Valerio	Rebecca	Valerio	Carlo	Carlo	Raquel	Nominated	Runner-Up (Day 70)	6
Rebecca	Chiqui	Pedro	Elizabeth	Juan	Carlo	Carlo	Juan	Javián	Nominated	Third Place (Day 70)	5
Javián	Pedro	Pedro	Valerio	Rebecca	Rebecca	Teresa	Carlo	Raquel	Nominated	Eliminated (Day 63)	7
Raquel	Chiqui	Carlo	Elizabeth	Teresa	Carlo	Carlo	Carlo	Javián	Eliminated (Day 56)		4
Carlo	Chiqui	Valerio	Teresa	Sofía	Valerio	Juan	Javián	Raquel	Eliminated (Day 49)		13
Teresa	Not in the game		Javián	Rebecca	Valerio	Carlo	Javián	Eliminated (Day 42)			2
Valerio	Rebecca	Carlo	Elizabeth	Juan	Carlo	Nilo	Eliminated (Day 35)				10
Sofía	Ángela	Pedro	Elizabeth	Juan	Carlo	Eliminated (Day 28)					0
Elizabeth	Chiqui	Raquel	Valerio	Eliminated (Day 21)							4
Pedro	Chiqui	Valerio	Valerio	Eliminated (Day 14)							5
Ángela	Chiqui	Left Competition (Day 7)									1
Chiqui	Elizabeth	Pedro	Eliminated (Day 7)								7
Nomination Notes	See note 1	See note 2	See note 3	See note 4	See note 5	See note 6	See note 7	See note 8	See note 9	None	
Nominated by Tribe	Chiqui	Pedro	Valerio	Rebecca	Carlo	Carlo	Carlo	Raquel			
Nominated by Leader	Rebecca	Raquel	Elizabeth	Sofía	Valerio	Teresa	Juan	Rebecca			
Nominated	Chiqui; Rebecca	Pedro; Raquel	Elizabeth; Valerio	Rebecca; Sofía	Carlo; Valerio	Carlo; Teresa	Carlo; Juan	Raquel; Rebecca	Javián; Juan; Rebecca	Juan; Nilo; Rebecca	
Eliminated	Chiqui; 53.9% to eliminate	Pedro; 56% to eliminate	Elizabeth; 91% to eliminate	Sofía; 51% to eliminate	Valerio; 53% to eliminate	Teresa; 58% to eliminate	Carlo; 52% to eliminate	Raquel; 59% to eliminate	Javián; 18.5% to save	Rebecca; 15.4% (Out of 3)	
Eliminated	Chiqui; 53.9% to eliminate	Pedro; 56% to eliminate	Elizabeth; 91% to eliminate	Sofía; 51% to eliminate	Valerio; 53% to eliminate	Teresa; 58% to eliminate	Carlo; 52% to eliminate	Raquel; 59% to eliminate	Javián; 18.5% to save	Juan; 31% to win	
Eliminated	Chiqui; 53.9% to eliminate	Pedro; 56% to eliminate	Elizabeth; 91% to eliminate	Sofía; 51% to eliminate	Valerio; 53% to eliminate	Teresa; 58% to eliminate	Carlo; 52% to eliminate	Raquel; 59% to eliminate	Javián; 18.5% to save	Nilo; 69% to win	

- ^Note 1: As the winner of the immunity challenge, Juan was given the power to name a second nominee.
- ^Note 2: As the winner of the immunity challenge, Elizabeth was given the power to name a second nominee.
- ^Note 3: As the winner of the immunity challenge, Rebecca was given the power to name a second nominee.
- ^Note 4: As the winner of the immunity challenge, Carlo was given the power to name a second nominee and was forced to break the tie that occurred at the tenth tribal councils.
- ^Note 5: As the winner of the immunity challenge, Nilo was given the power to name a second nominee.
- ^Note 6: As the winner of the immunity challenge, Javián was given the power to name a second nominee.
- ^Note 7: As the winner of the immunity challenge, Rebecca was given the power to name a second nominee.
- ^Note 8: As the winner of the immunity challenge, Nilo was given the power to name a second nominee.
- ^Note 9: As they lost the final immunity challenge, Javián, Juan, and Rebecca were automatically nominated for elimination.
