= Emma Noble =

English model and actress

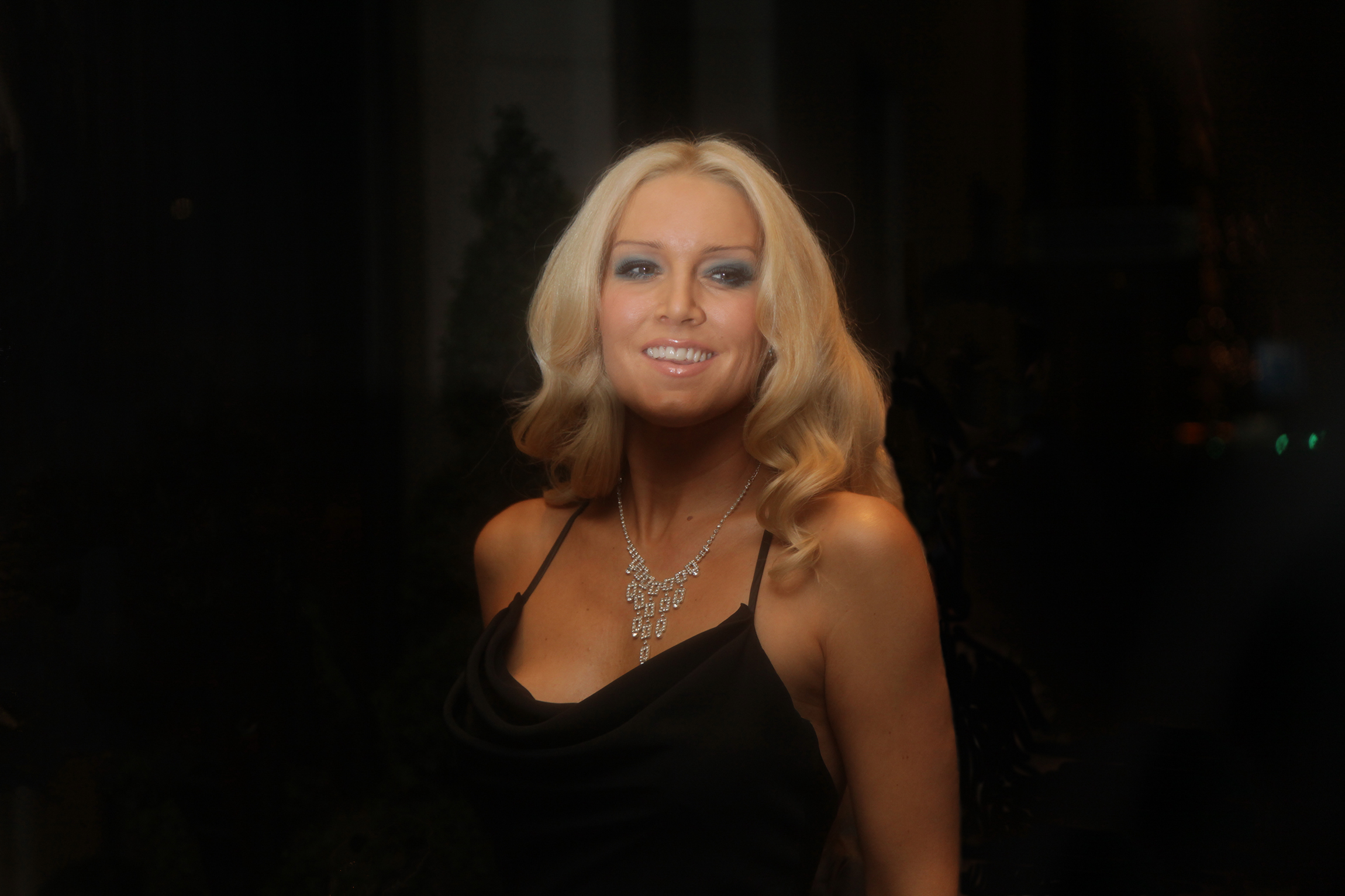
- Noble in 2012
- Born: Emma Jane Noble; 26 June 1971 (age 55); London, England
- Occupations: Model; actress
- Spouse(s): James Major (m. 1999; div. 2004) Conrad Baker (m. 2013)
- Children: 1
- Modeling information
- Height: 5 ft 8 in (1.73 m)
- Hair color: Blonde
- Eye color: Green

Emma Jane Noble (born 26 June 1971) is an English model and actress. She was hostess on Bruce Forsyth's game show The Price Is Right for four years.

She worked as a catwalk model for John Rocha and Ghost before turning to commercial modelling work. Her acting work includes appearances in Crossroads playing Suzie Samson, Jonathan Creek, Casualty, Dennis Potter's Cold Lazarus, the film The Truth About Love and the UK stage tour of Popcorn by Ben Elton. In 2005, Noble appeared on the Five reality TV programme The Farm, and gave her fee to the National Autistic Society. In 2008 she was made Global Ambassador for the National Autistic Society; in this role she headed the successful national campaign "Think differently about Autism".

== Personal life ==
Noble was born and brought up in London. Noble met James Major, son of former Prime Minister John Major, at a dinner at London's Café Royal in February 1998. The couple became engaged that May, and were married in May 1999 in the Palace of Westminster in London. The reception was held at The Dorchester and earned them a £400,000 deal from Hello!. After her marriage she was known as Emma Major. The couple have a son, Harrison ("Harry"), born in July 2000, who was later diagnosed as autistic.

The marriage ended in an acrimonious divorce in 2004, with Noble accusing Major of "unreasonable behaviour". Noble was granted a decree nisi on the uncontested grounds that her husband had behaved in such a way that she could not reasonably be expected to continue living with him.

In August 2013, Noble married businessman Conrad Baker in Canterbury Cathedral. The wedding was conducted by the Dean of Canterbury, the Very Rev. Robert Willis, a friend of the Baker family.
