= Dick Spanner, P.I. =

1987 British TV comedy series

- Promotional image featuring the title character, Dick Spanner
- Genre: Science fiction comedy Crime comedy Detective fiction Police procedural Parody
- Created by: Terry Adlam
- Written by: Tony Barwick
- Directed by: Terry Adlam; Steve Begg
- Voices of: Shane Rimmer
- Music by: Christopher Burr
- Country of origin: United Kingdom
- Original language: English
- No. of series: 1
- No. of episodes: 22 (4 in alternative 24‑minute format)

Production
- Producers: Gerry Anderson; Christopher Burr
- Cinematography: Steve Begg; Paddy Seale
- Animator: Mark Woollard
- Editor: Jack Gardner
- Running time: 6 minutes
- Production company: The Anderson Burr Partnership

Original release
- Network: Channel 4
- Release: 3 May – 27 September 1987

Dick Spanner, P.I. is a 1987 British stop-motion animated comedy series which parodied Chandleresque detective shows. The title character and protagonist was Dick Spanner, voiced by Shane Rimmer, a robotic private detective who works cases in a futuristic urban setting. The show made frequent use of puns and visual gags.

The series consisted of 22 six-minute episodes, covering two-story arcs of equal length: "The Case of the Human Cannonball" and "The Case of the Maltese Parrot". The programme was originally broadcast in the United Kingdom as a segment of the Sunday morning show Network 7 on Channel 4, and was later repeated on the same channel in a late night spot.

Produced by Thunderbirds creator Gerry Anderson, the series was created and written by Terry Adlam, who had previously worked on effects for Anderson's Terrahawks. It was also the basis for the Anderson-created Tennents Pilsner advertising campaign using the Lou Tennent character (voiced by Vivian Stanshall).

== Commercial releases ==
=== DVD ===
A DVD of the series was released on 15 October 2007, with extras including an interview with Gerry Anderson. At the request of Anderson himself, the episodes featured new acoustic background music in place of the original synthesiser theme tune/background music (which is probably the series' most famous element and is fondly remembered by many who watched the series on Network 7). The remaining soundtrack (sound effects etc.) were altered to the extent that many of the show's audio gags either no longer work, or are missing entirely. The quality of the original prints appears to have degraded somewhat since the VHS releases, as they seem a lot cleaner and have more vibrant colour. In addition, a number of white lines appear momentarily, possibly indicating that the picture was taken from a degraded video source rather than original film elements. The picture is also cropped into 16:9 format, occasionally cropping off part of a signpost or graffiti gag in the process. Finally, although the DVD release version is split into the original six-minute segments, the original end credits sequences have been replaced by a new set of credits made for the DVD.

In September 2013, the series in its original 5-minute state with original music and 4:3 aspect ratio was uploaded to YouTube by One Media. The quality was superior to that on the DVD, being much more vivid in colour. Since December 2016, however, the series can no longer be found on YouTube, as the channel has been taken down. This is likely due to One Media's copyright for "Dick Spanner" expiring, as two months later, Anderson Entertainment issued several takedown notices for other YouTube uploads.

A new DVD by Network was released on 4 September 2017. This featured the original music and episodes uncut and in the original aspect ratio, with the two stories presented in both episodic and compilation formats.

== Missing puppet hoax ==
In October 2007, it was reported by several newspapers (including The Independent) that Gerry Anderson was searching for the original Dick Spanner puppet, which had last been seen in the possession of "Clive", a man who had worked on the show. This was later revealed to be a publicity stunt to promote the new DVD release, and the statement was made by a DVD publicist without Anderson's knowledge.
