= Celebrity Circus (Australian TV series) =

Australian reality television show

- Genre: Reality television
- Presented by: Charles Tingwell
- Country of origin: Australia
- Original language: English
- No. of seasons: 1
- No. of episodes: 4

Production
- Production locations: Melbourne, Victoria, Australia
- Running time: 70 minutes

Original release
- Network: Nine Network
- Release: 8 May – 29 May 2005

Celebrity Circus is an Australian reality television series that aired in May 2005 on the Nine Network. The show took celebrities and, with the help of Silvers Circus, trained them into circus acts. In the final show, the celebrities performed in front of a live crowd and showcased what they had learned. It was shown over five one-hour episodes and was hosted by Bud Tingwell. The various skills in the show were high-wire, flying trapeze, knife throwing, fire juggling and clowning. Some of the performers were also trained in two events called the Human Cannon and the Wheel of Death.

The participants were: actors Cameron Daddo and Kimberley Davies; former Home and Away star Dieter Brummer; Celebrity Big Brother winner Dylan Lewis; Australia's Funniest Home Video Show host Toni Pearen; Vadim Dale (from Outback Jack) and his fiancé, Natalie Franzman; Olympic beach volleyball gold medallist Kerri Pottharst; and Ricki-Lee Coulter from Australian Idol. The first episode, which aired on 8 May, was placed in the top ten of the ratings for that week.

The series appeared in the Portugal on TVI in 2006 as Circo das Celebridades. On 11 June 2008 an American version began airing on NBC.

== International versions ==
Currently airing franchise
Franchise no longer in production

Region/Country	Local name	Network	Main presenter	Date premiered
Argentina	El Circo De Las Estrellas	Telefe	Susana Giménez	26 March 2007
Belarus	Звездный цирк Zvezdnyi tsirk	ONT		20 January 2007
Brazil	Circo do Faustão	Rede Globo	Fausto Silva	8 July 2007
Chile	Circo de estrellas	TVN	Rafael Araneda	25 March 2010
India	Comedy Circus	Sony TV	Shruti Seth	16 June 2007
Italy	Reality Circus	Canale 5	Barbara D'Urso	17 September 2006
Mexico	Los 5 Magníficos	Televisa	Marco Antonio Regil	15 April 2007
Portugal	Circo das Celebridades	TVI	Júlia Pinheiro	19 March 2006
Poland	Gwiezdny Cyrk	Polsat	Zygmunt Chajzer and Agnieszka Popielewicz	6 March 2008
Russia	Цирк со звёздами Tsirk so zvezdami	1TV	Ivan Urgant and Sasha Volkovskaya	4 March 2007
Spain	Circus: Más dificil todavía	Cuatro	Josep Lobató	15 September 2008
Turkey	Ünlüler Sirki	Star TV	Süheyl Uygur	2007
United Kingdom	Cirque de Celebrité	Sky One	Ruby Wax (2006), Jenni Falconer (2007)	15 October 2006
United States	Celebrity Circus	NBC	Joey Fatone	11 June 2008
