= Celebrity Circus (American TV series) =

- Genre: Reality Television
- Based on: Circo das Celebridades
- Directed by: Alan Carter
- Presented by: Joey Fatone
- Judges: Mitch Gaylord; Aurelia Cats; Louie Spence
- Music by: Brad Chiet
- Country of origin: United States
- No. of series: 1
- No. of episodes: 6

Production
- Executive producers: Matt Kunitz; Rick Ringbakk
- Producers: Don Harary; Natalee Watts
- Editors: Anne-Marie Hess; Todd Muschamp; Mac Caudill; Patrick Sayers
- Running time: 90 minutes (premiere, ep 2); 60 minutes (episodes 3-6)
- Production company: Endemol USA

Original release
- Network: NBC
- Release: June 11 – July 16, 2008

Related
- Celebrity Circus (Australian TV series); Cirque de Celebrité

Celebrity Circus is an American version of the Celebrity Circus reality television show based on the Portuguese television series of Circo das Celebridades, not to be confused with Australian TV series of the same name that aired in 2005. The show is produced by Endemol USA with Matt Kunitz as executive producer and Rick Ringbakk, as co-executive producer.

On March 13, 2009, it was confirmed that the series had been canceled and would not be returning for a second season.

== Format ==
The show is hosted by Joey Fatone. The judges for the series are Olympic gymnast Mitch Gaylord, contortionist Aurelia Cats and choreographer Louie Spence who is also a judge on the British version.

The celebrities are trained to perform various circus acts, and compete with each other for points from the judges and phone votes from the public on premium rated lines or by online voting via the official website. The acts are interspersed with banter and video from the training sessions and interviews. The two scores are combined, 50% judges vote and 50% phone votes, and the celebrity with the lowest combined score is eliminated.

== Season 1 ==
NBC announced the first season of Celebrity Circus on January 18, 2008, on the same day ABC announced it was in negotiations on a revival of Circus of the Stars. On March 8, 2008, NBC announced the network's 2008 summer schedule with a two-hour premiere on June 11, 2008. Shortly after, on April 16, 2008, ABC announced that the network decided to pass on a revival of Circus of the Stars due to NBC premiering Celebrity Circus.

NBC later announced that Celebrity Circus would have a ninety-minute premiere on June 11, 2008, instead of a two-hour premiere. Beginning on Wednesday, June 18, 2008, Celebrity Circus will air one-hour episodes at 9:00 PM ET/PT. NBC announced on April 23, 2008 the host for the show would be former *NSYNC member Joey Fatone with originally Antonio Sabato, Jr., Blu Cantrell, Christopher Knight, Janet Evans, Jason "Wee Man" Acuña and Rachel Hunter taking part. A seventh celebrity, Stacey Dash was revealed on June 9, 2008.

In Week 3, Stacey Dash earned the first 10. In Week 4, Wee Man earned the first average of 10.

Blu Cantrell was the first contestant eliminated from the Celebrity Circus on June 18, 2008. Janet Evans was the second contestant eliminated from the show on June 25, 2008. Christopher Knight was not eliminated on July 2, 2008, but was forced to withdraw after breaking his arm again during rehearsal (he had fractured it in Week 1).

=== Celebrities ===
Celebrities taking part in Celebrity Circus are:

Celebrity	Famous for	Week of departure
Antonio Sabato Jr.	General Hospital actor & model	Week Six (Finale) - Winner July 16, 2008
Blu Cantrell	Singer-songwriter	Week Two - Eliminated June 18, 2008
Christopher Knight	The Brady Bunch actor	Week Four - Withdrew July 2, 2008
Janet Evans	Olympic freestyle swimmer	Week Three - Eliminated June 25, 2008
Jason "Wee Man" Acuña	Jackass cast member	Week Six (Finale) - 3rd Place July 16, 2008
Rachel Hunter	Supermodel	Week Five - Eliminated July 9, 2008
Stacey Dash	Film & television actress	Week Six (Finale) - 2nd Place July 16, 2008

=== Elimination ===
	1	2	3	4	5	6
Celebrity	Result					
Antonio Sabato, Jr.			Bottom 2	Bottom 4	Bottom 2	Winner
Stacey Dash				Bottom 2	Bottom 3	Runner-Up
Jason "Wee Man" Acuña		Bottom 3	Bottom 3	Bottom 3		3rd Place
Rachel Hunter		Bottom 2		Bottom 2	Eliminated	
Christopher Knight		Bottom 4		Withdrew		
Janet Evans			Eliminated			
Blu Cantrell		Eliminated				
