= Insiders (Spanish TV series) =

Spanish reality television series

- Genre: Reality television
- Created by: Jose Velasco
- Directed by: Mamen Fernández
- Presented by: Najwa Nimri
- Composer: Alfonso G. Aguilar
- Country of origin: Spain
- Original language: Spanish
- No. of seasons: 2
- No. of episodes: 14

Production
- Executive producers: Jose Velasco; Sara Fernández-Velasco; Arantza Sánchez; Marco A. Castillo
- Producers: Hortensia López; Yaiza Sánchez
- Cinematography: Javier Ruiz
- Running time: 43-60 minutes
- Production company: iZen

Original release
- Network: Netflix
- Release: October 21, 2021 – May 26, 2022

Insiders is a Spanish reality television series hosted by Najwa Nimri. It premiered on Netflix on October 21, 2021.

== Premise ==
Thirteen contestants are gathered in a 1,600 square-meter studio under the guise of the final stage of the casting process for a reality show. What they do not know is that, in fact, they are already in the show: cameras are secretly filming them during all their stay in the area. The objective of this is to catch contestants off guard and make them confront the differences in their behavior between the times they know they are being filmed and the times they think they are not. The winner will earn a €100,000 prize.

== Season 1 (2021) ==
=== Contestants ===
Name	Age	Hometown	Occupation	Entered	Exited	Result
Nicole	27	Canary Islands	Social media personality	1	7	Winner
Laura	25	Madrid	Graduate in Journalism	1	7	Runner-Up
Olaya	21	Barcelona	Luxury store salesperson	1	7	Third Place (Note: Iván and Olaya's eliminations in the finale were announced at the same time without disclosing the full results; therefore, they are considered to be tied for third.)
Iván Molina	28	Valencia	Professional poker player	1	7	Third Place
Peter	26	Madrid	Engineer and DJ	1	7	8th Eliminated
Estefanía	29	Valencia	Student	1	6	7th Eliminated
Fama	26	Blanes	Graduate in Physical Education	1	6	6th Eliminated
Hugo	33	Madrid	Cook	1	5	5th Eliminated
Bárbara "Bibi"	25	Madrid	Make-up artist	1	4	4th Eliminated / Fan Favourite
Cynthia	24	Barcelona	Graduate in Tourism	2	3	3rd Eliminated
Query	35	Chipiona	Hospital attendant and town councilman	1	3	2nd Eliminated
Iván Míguez	33	Ibiza	Restaurant manager	1	2	1st Eliminated
Tatiana	28	Málaga	Comedian	1	2	Fake contestant (Note: Tatiana was later revealed to be an actress who was there to fool the contestants.)

=== Results and elimination ===
	Casting Phase 12 Days				Streaming Phase 7 Days					
	Episode 1	Episode 2	Episode 3	Episode 4	Episode 5	Episode 6		Episode 7 Final		
Nicole	Exempt	Pass	Pass	Pass	Peter	Exempt	Not; Eligible	Not; Eligible	Finalist	Winner (Episode 7)
Laura	Exempt	Pass	Pass	Pass	Hugo	Not; Eligible	Not; Eligible	Not; Eligible	Finalist	Runner-up (Episode 7)
Iván Molina	Exempt	Pass	Pass	Pass	Hugo	Not; Eligible	Not; Eligible	Peter	Finalist	Third Place (Episode 7)
Olaya	Exempt	Pass	Pass	Pass	Nicole	Not; Eligible	Not; Eligible	Not; Eligible	Finalist	Third Place (Episode 7)
Peter	Exempt	Pass	Pass	Pass	Hugo	Exempt	Not; Eligible	Not; Eligible	Eliminated (Episode 7)	Laura
Estefanía	Exempt	Pass	Pass	Pass	Nicole	Not; Eligible	Not; Eligible	Eliminated (Episode 6)		Iván Molina
Fama	Exempt	Pass	Pass	Pass	Hugo	Not; Eligible	Estefanía	Eliminated (Episode 6)		Laura
Hugo	Exempt	Pass	Pass	Pass	Peter	Fama	Eliminated (Episode 5)			Nicole
Bárbara	Exempt	Pass	Pass	Failed	Eliminated (Episode 4)					Nicole
Cynthia	Not in House	Exempt	Failed	Eliminated (Episode 3)						Nicole
Query	Exempt	Pass	Failed	Eliminated (Episode 3)						Nicole
Iván Míguez	Exempt	Failed	Eliminated (Episode 2)							Olaya
Tatiana	Exempt	Left (Episode 2)								
Eliminated	Tatiana; Fake contestant	Iván Míguez; Committee's choice to eliminate	Query; Committee's choice to eliminate	Bárbara; Committee's choice to eliminate	Hugo; 4 of 8 votes to eliminate	Fama; Hugo's choice to eliminate	Estefanía; Fama's choice to eliminate	Peter; Iván Molina's choice to eliminate	Winner	Nicole; 4 of 8 votes to win
Eliminated	Tatiana; Fake contestant	Iván Míguez; Committee's choice to eliminate	Query; Committee's choice to eliminate	Bárbara; Committee's choice to eliminate	Hugo; 4 of 8 votes to eliminate	Fama; Hugo's choice to eliminate	Estefanía; Fama's choice to eliminate	Peter; Iván Molina's choice to eliminate	Finalist	Laura; 2 of 8 votes to win
Eliminated	Tatiana; Fake contestant	Iván Míguez; Committee's choice to eliminate	Cynthia; Committee's choice to eliminate	Bárbara; Committee's choice to eliminate	Hugo; 4 of 8 votes to eliminate	Fama; Hugo's choice to eliminate	Estefanía; Fama's choice to eliminate	Peter; Iván Molina's choice to eliminate	Finalist	Iván Molina; 1 of 8 votes to win
Eliminated	Tatiana; Fake contestant	Iván Míguez; Committee's choice to eliminate	Cynthia; Committee's choice to eliminate	Bárbara; Committee's choice to eliminate	Hugo; 4 of 8 votes to eliminate	Fama; Hugo's choice to eliminate	Estefanía; Fama's choice to eliminate	Peter; Iván Molina's choice to eliminate	Finalist	Olaya; 1 of 8 votes to win

== Season 2 (2022) ==
During a press conference for Netflix's Spanish originals at the 2021 Vitoria FesTVal, Álvaro Díaz, Netflix Spain's director of non-fiction content, confirmed that a second season had already been filmed. Season 2 premiered on May 19, 2022. Laura and Peter from Season 1 returned as 'mole' contestants, trained by the show's crew for a special assignment.

=== Contestants ===
Name	Age	Hometown	Occupation	Entered	Exited	Result
Raquel Arias	29	Madrid	Model	Episode 1	Episode 7	Winner
Lorenzo	34	Ciudad Real	Graphic designer	Episode 1	Episode 7	Runner-Up
Ainhoa "Nowa"	29	Mérida	Social worker	Episode 1	Episode 7	Third Place
Ramón	30	Ibiza	Private chef	Episode 1	Episode 7	Fourth Place
Marta	25	Madrid	HR	Episode 1	Episode 6	6th Eliminated
Adán	30	Seville	Businessman	Episode 1	Episode 6	5th Eliminated
Tania	35	La Rioja	Store clerk	Episode 1	Episode 5	4th Eliminated
Pablo	29	Huelva	Engineer	Episode 1	Episode 3	3rd Eliminated
Sofía	25	Santa Cruz	Business Administration student	Episode 1	Episode 3	2nd Eliminated
Álex	34	Madrid	Commercial advisor	Episode 1	Episode 2	1st Eliminated
Laura	25	Madrid	Graduate in Journalism	Episode 1	Episode 2	Fake contestants
Peter	24	Madrid	Engineer and DJ	Episode 1	Episode 4	Fake contestants

=== Results and elimination ===
	Casting Phase 12 Days				Streaming Phase 7 Days					
	Episode 1	Episode 2	Episode 3	Episode 4	Episode 5		Episode 6		Episode 7 Final	
Raquel	Exempt	Pass	Pass	Pass	Lorenzo	Not; Eligible	Not; Eligible	Not; Eligible	Finalist	Winner (Episode 7)
Lorenzo	Exempt	Pass	Pass	Pass	Ramón	Tania	Not; Eligible	Not; Eligible	Finalist	Runner-up (Episode 7)
Nowa	Exempt	Pass	Pass	Pass	Adán	Not; Eligible	Not; Eligible	Not; Eligible	Finalist	Third Place (Episode 7)
Ramón	Exempt	Pass	Pass	Pass	Lorenzo	Not; Eligible	Not; Eligible	Not; Eligible	Finalist	Fourth Place (Episode 7)
Marta	Exempt	Pass	Pass	Pass	Raquel	Not; Eligible	Not; Eligible	Not; Eligible	Eliminated (Episode 6)	Lorenzo
Adán	Exempt	Pass	Pass	Pass	Tania	Tania	Not; Eligible	Marta	Eliminated (Episode 6)	Raquel
Tania	Exempt	Pass	Pass	Pass	Adán	Not; Eligible	Adán	Eliminated (Episode 5)		Nowa
Peter	Exempt	Pass	Pass	Pass	Left (Episode 4)					
Pablo	Exempt	Pass	Failed	Eliminated (Episode 3)						Raquel
Sofía	Exempt	Pass	Failed	Eliminated (Episode 3)						Raquel
Álex	Exempt	Failed	Eliminated (Episode 2)							Lorenzo
Laura	Exempt	Left (Episode 2)								
Eliminated	Laura; Fake contestant	Álex; Committee's choice to eliminate	Sofía; Committee's choice to eliminate	Peter; Fake contestant	Lorenzo; 2 of 7 votes to fake evict	Tania; Lorenzo & Adán's choice to eliminate	Adán; Tania's choice to eliminate	Marta; Adán's choice to eliminate	Winner	Raquel; 3 of 6 votes to win
Eliminated	Laura; Fake contestant	Álex; Committee's choice to eliminate	Sofía; Committee's choice to eliminate	Peter; Fake contestant	Lorenzo; 2 of 7 votes to fake evict	Tania; Lorenzo & Adán's choice to eliminate	Adán; Tania's choice to eliminate	Marta; Adán's choice to eliminate	Finalist	Lorenzo; 2 of 6 votes to win
Eliminated	Laura; Fake contestant	Álex; Committee's choice to eliminate	Pablo; Committee's choice to eliminate	Peter; Fake contestant	Adán; 2 of 7 votes to fake evict	Tania; Lorenzo & Adán's choice to eliminate	Adán; Tania's choice to eliminate	Marta; Adán's choice to eliminate	Finalist	Nowa; 1 of 6 votes to win
Eliminated	Laura; Fake contestant	Álex; Committee's choice to eliminate	Pablo; Committee's choice to eliminate	Peter; Fake contestant	Adán; 2 of 7 votes to fake evict	Tania; Lorenzo & Adán's choice to eliminate	Adán; Tania's choice to eliminate	Marta; Adán's choice to eliminate	Finalist	Ramón; 0 of 6 votes to win

== Episodes ==
=== Series overview ===
Season	Episodes	Originally released	
Season	Episodes	First released	Last released
1	7	October 21, 2021	
2	7	May 19, 2022	May 26, 2022

=== Season 1 (2021) ===
No. overall	No. in season	Title	Original release date
1	1	"Welcome to Insiders" (Bienvenidos a Insiders)	October 21, 2021
After host Najwa Nimri explains some basic aspects of the show to the viewers, the contestants arrive and meet the crew, including deciding committee members Marina and Rubén (who are actually two actors playing producers). They are allowed to keep their phones for fifteen more minutes to say goodbye to their friends and families before the final casting begins (unbeknownst to them, they are already in the show proper). Mamen, the show's director, tells the contestants that their phone interactions have resulted in a leak to the press, and the show could be shut down if the culprit doesn't come forward.
2	2	"If You Tell Anyone, You're Out" (Si lo cuentas, estás fuera)	October 21, 2021
Tatiana comes forward as the person inadvertently responsible for filming the video that resulted in the alleged leak, and is removed from the show. As viewers learn through a flashforward that Tatiana is another actress, and never was an actual contestant, new player Cynthia arrives as Tatiana's replacement. The contestants' morals are put to the test by the committee with a challenge involving a gun loaded with blank bullets (although the players aren't told of that last detail) and four rabbits locked in glass capsules, players then being asked to shoot one of the rabbits. Hugo is up first, and refuses on principle to harm any of the animals, being then warned by Rubén that he will be cut from the casting if he discusses the test with the rest of contestants. The other players are put to the same test, and several of them do pull the trigger. Iván Míguez is eliminated.
3	3	"No Such Thing as Perfection" (La perfección no existe)	October 21, 2021
4	4	"Streaming Life" (La vida en streaming)	October 21, 2021
5	5	"Double Feature" (Sesión continua)	October 21, 2021
Hugo is voted out of the competition by the other players, and learns that he can pick the next eliminated contestant out of the players who did not receive any votes; but he has to be careful, because that person will also get to choose the next eliminated player.
6	6	"Taking You Down with Me" (Te arrastro conmigo)	October 21, 2021
After staying in the house for some more time to make his decision, Hugo, having promised Nicole that he would think of her, eliminates the one contestant he is sure will not remove Nicole from the game: Fama, who later chooses to eliminate Estefanía. Instead of picking the next elimination herself, Estefanía has the chance to pick which of the remaining players will choose the last eliminated contestant before the finale. She chooses Iván Molina, despite him having asked her not to. Peter goes into the white room and announces he has a plan.
7	7	"The Last Shall Be First" (Los últimos serán los primeros)	October 21, 2021
Peter's strategy is to sacrifice himself so that Laura can have a chance of winning, asking Iván to eliminate him, claiming that he had a deal to split the prize with Laura and promising Iván to give him his half of the prize should Laura win. Iván reluctantly eliminates Peter. The eliminated contestants then learn that the alleged software that was assessing their qualities to determine who was closest to being the "perfect contestant" was a ruse; instead, they are the ones who will vote to determine the winner. After the vote, Nicole is announced as the winner. The season ends with Najwa announcing that Insiders is not over yet: the crew has a new plan for the next season, and Laura will be involved in it.

=== Season 2 (2022) ===
No. overall	No. in season	Title	Original release date
8	1	"Insiders's Main Game" (El gran juego de Insiders)	May 19, 2022
9	2	"Nothing's What It Seems" (Nada es lo que parece)	May 19, 2022
10	3	"Two Sides" (Dos bandos)	May 19, 2022
11	4	"They're In" (Están dentro)	May 26, 2022
12	5	"Join Forces or Die" (Aliarse o morir)	May 26, 2022
13	6	"Insiders in Check" (Jaque a Insiders)	May 26, 2022
14	7	"The Perfect Contestant" (El concursante perfecto)	May 26, 2022

== Critical reception ==
Insiders was met with positive to mixed reviews in Spain, being hailed as a return to the essence of reality television. FormulaTV's Sergio Navarro compared the show to American television series Unreal, noting that it showed the crew plotting where the show was heading. "And it is thrilling to witness those private meetings, unbeknownst to the contestants, where you can see how they weave the twists and turns and how they come together to create an exciting program."

Bluper's Juan M. Fernández also picked up on the comparison to Unreal, while praising the decision to keep the runtime at an hour or less per episode: "It was about time that shows with episodes of no more than 50 minutes were done in this country. The show wins with it. More so with such outstanding music. Insiders cuts to the chase, gets right down to business."

Espinof's Mikel Zorrilla was less impressed, noting that the format becomes overcomplicated in its attempt to keep contestants and viewers alike on their toes: "Insiders wants to outsmart everyone, at once trying to retrieve something unique and to constantly surprise. The mixture is striking at first, but there is a point where everything turns out kind of random, leaving the show at a strange middle ground between the search for something real and the completely manufactured."

For similar reasons, Decider's Joel Keller advised readers to skip the show, concluding: "There’s a good reality competition somewhere within the convoluted format of Insiders. But the pains the producers take to keep their secret from the contestants makes it all about the conceit and not the contestants themselves."
