= Chiquetete =

Spanish flamenco singer

- Born: Antonio José Cortés Pantoja; 26 July 1948
- Died: 16 December 2018 (aged 70)

Antonio José Cortés Pantoja, better known by his artistic name Chiquetete (26 July 1948 – 16 December 2018), was a Spanish flamenco singer, cousin of the tonadillera Isabel Pantoja.

== Early life ==
Born in Algeciras, in Andalusia, in a Romani family, although they soon moved their residence to Seville when he was 8 years old. With 12 years he started in the art world forming part of the group Los algecireños -possibly called Los Gitanillos del Tardón- with Manuel Molina Jiménez and Manolo Domínguez el Rubio. At that time he adopted the artistic name of his maternal uncle, and father of the also artist Isabel Pantoja, Juan Pantoja Cortés who had formed a flamenco trio called Trío de los gaditanos with Florencio Ruiz Lara and Manuel Molina the Lacemaker and who in turn had taken the artistic name of his father Pipoño de Jerez, later known as the Chiquetete de Jerez because a neighbor of the town and native of Alicante began calling him xiquet (child).

== Career ==
Alternating his career with the trio with performances in different festivals in 1976, he won the Mairena del Alcor Prize. After that he began his solo career with the recording of the LP record Triana despierta with Paco Cepero and Enrique de Melchor.

For a few years he continued as flamenco cantaor until in 1980, with his LP Altozano, he changed his career and entered a genre of romantic ballad with flamenco influence. The second LP of this stage, Tú y yo, of 1981, it still contained traditional rhythms such as bulerías, fandangos or soleares. In 1988 he launched Sevilla sin tu amor, which contained one of his greatest successes: A la Puerta de Toledo. A year later publishes Canalla, with subjects composed by Juan Pardo, that nevertheless did not reach a great commercial repercussion.

In the decade of the nineties he came to publish three LPs, although his career began a certain decline, because it would not repeat the successes achieved in previous decades. One of his most renowned songs is Cobardía.

After a retired period, in 2004 he published Como la marea baja, under the musical production of his son Fran Cortés. This son, along with the eldest, Antonio, and a daughter, Rocío, are the three of them in their marriage with their first wife, bailaora Amparo Cazalla Mora. Between 1994 and 2003 he was married to television personality Raquel Bollo, with whom he had two sons.

On 5 January 2018, Chiquetete starred in an incident when he represented the magician king Melchor in Carmona. At the beginning of the visit to the school of the Sisters of the Cross, he removed his beard and crown because they were bothering him. But during the speech he went further and let go, before an audience full of children: «I am a singer, I am Chiquetete».

== Death ==
On 16 December 2018, Chiquetete died in Seville from a heart failure resulting from a hip operation he had undergone several days before. He was survived by his girlfriend Carmen Gahona and his five children.
