= Supervivientes: Perdidos en Honduras (2011) =

- Presented by: Jorge Javier Vázquez
- No. of days: 85
- No. of castaways: 19
- Winner: Rosa Benito
- Runner-up: Rosi Arcas
- Location: Cayos Cochinos, Honduras
- No. of episodes: 13

Release
- Original network: Telecinco
- Original release: May 5 – July 28, 2011

Season chronology
- ← Previous; 2010 Next → 2014

Supervivientes 2011: Perdidos en Honduras is the eighth season of the show Supervivientes and the twelfth season of Survivor to air in Spain. It was broadcast on Telecinco from May 5, 2011 to July 28, 2011.

For this year, the show returned to Honduras for the fourth time. For this season, Jorge Javier Vázquez acted as the main host at the central studio in Madrid, with Raquel Sánchez Silva co-hosting from the island, and Christian Gálvez hosting a side debate of the program.

== Season summary ==
The main twist this season was that of "Purgatory"; beginning with the first elimination and continuing through the fifth elimination, many of the eliminated contestants were sent to Purgatory following their elimination. Once in Purgatory they would live with the Anonymous contestants. This twist came to an end on Day 32 when the contestants living there all faced a public vote to determine who'd return to the game. Ultimately, it was Rosa Benito who won this season over Rosa María "Rosi" Arcas and Tatiana Delgado.

== Finishing order ==
Contestant	Occupation/Famous For	Original tribe	Merged tribe	Finish
Aída Nízar; 35, Valladolid	Gran Hermano 5 housemate	Celebrity		1st Voted Out; Day 14
Jacobo Ostos; 26, Madrid	Jaime Ostos's son	Celebrity		2nd Voted Out; Day 21
Reyes Estévez; 34, Barcelona	Olympic middle-distance athlete	Celebrity		3rd Voted Out; Day 32
Diego Durán; 33, Pontevedra	Hotel industry	Anonymous		4th Voted Out; Day 32
Xexu López; 33, A Coruña	Lawyer	Anonymous	Merged Tribe	5th Voted Out; Day 35
Kiko Rivera; 27, Sevilla	Isabel Pantoja and Paquirri's son	Celebrity	Merged Tribe	Left Competition; Day 35
Tamara Gorro; 24, Segovia	Realities' star	Celebrity	Merged Tribe	Left Competition; Day 35
José Manuel Montalvo; 30, Madrid	Mister Spain 2008	Celebrity	Merged Tribe	6th Voted Out; Day 42
Alberto García; 30, Cádiz	Mister Cádiz 2008	Celebrity	Merged Tribe	Ejected; Day 49
Emma Díaz; 41, Las Palmas	Saleswoman	Anonymous	Merged Tribe	7th Voted Out; Day 49
Carolina Córdoba; 20, Linares	Policewoman	Anonymous	Merged Tribe	8th Voted Out; Day 56
Arturo Requejo; 34, Irun	Gran Hermano 11 housemate	Celebrity	Merged Tribe	9th Voted Out; Day 63
Tony Genil; 63, Córdoba	Showman and television personality	Celebrity	Merged Tribe	10th Voted Out; Day 70
Jéssica Bueno; 20, Sevilla	Miss Sevilla 2010	Celebrity	Merged Tribe	11th Voted Out; Day 77
Jeyko Vigil; 26, Madrid	Dancer	Anonymous	Merged Tribe	12th Voted Out; Day 77
Sonia Monroy; 38, Barcelona	Singer and actress	Celebrity	Merged Tribe	13th Voted Out; Day 84
Tatiana Delgado; 26, Madrid	Stripper	Celebrity	Merged Tribe	Evacuated; Day 4
Tatiana Delgado; 26, Madrid	Stripper	Celebrity	Merged Tribe	Third Place; Day 84
Rosi Arcas; 24, Córdoba	Saleswoman	Anonymous	Merged Tribe	Runner-Up; Day 84
Rosa Benito; 55, Alicante	Television personality	Celebrity	Merged Tribe	Sole Survivor; Day 84

== Nominations ==
	Week 1	Week 2	Week 3	Week 4	Week 5		Week 6	Week 7	Week 8	Week 9	Week 10	Week 11		Week 12	Final		Votes
Rosa	Aída	Kiko	Jacobo	Sonia	Diego	Immune	Toni	Emma	Carolina	Toni; Arturo	Rosi; Jéssica	Rosi; Jéssica	Nominated	Rosi	Nominated	Sole Survivor (Day 84)	9
Rosi	Reyes	Reyes	Tatiana	Tatiana	Emma	Nominated	Emma	Toni	Carolina	Sonia; Arturo	Sonia; Toni	Rosa; Sonia	Nominated	Rosa	Finalist	Runner-Up (Day 84)	7
Tatiana	Rosa	Evacuated (Day 4)	Toni	Sonia	Diego	Immune	Toni	Emma	Carolina	Sonia; Toni	Sonia; Toni	Sonia	Nominated	Sonia	Nominated	Third Place (Day 84)	10
Sonia	Aída	Kiko	Tamara	Tatiana	Emma	Immune	Montalvo	Rosa	Arturo	Tatiana; Arturo	Rosi; Jéssica	Rosi; Jéssica	Nominated	Rosi	Eliminated (Day 84)		24
Jeyko	Reyes	Reyes	Sonia	Sonia	Emma	Nominated	Emma	Emma	Carolina	Arturo	Rosa	Jéssica; Rosa	Nominated	Sonia	Eliminated (Day 77)		2
Jéssica	Rosa	Sonia	Sonia	Sonia	Diego	Immune	Toni	Sonia	Carolina	Sonia; Toni	Sonia; Toni	Rosa; Sonia	Eliminated (Day 77)				7
Toni	Aída	Jéssica	Tamara	Tatiana	Purgatory		Rosa	Emma	Arturo	Rosa; Tatiana	Rosi; Jéssica	Eliminated (Day 70)					17
Arturo	Not in the game							Immune	Toni	Toni; Sonia	Eliminated (Day 63)						5
Carolina	Reyes	Reyes	Toni	Sonia	Diego	Nominated	Jeyko	Emma	Arturo	Eliminated (Day 56)							5
Emma	Reyes	Reyes	Tatiana	Tatiana	Diego	Nominated	Jeyko	Sonia	Eliminated (Day 49)								11
Alberto	Not in the game							Immune	Ejected (Day 49)								0
Montalvo	Kiko	Toni	Jacobo	Tamara	Diego	Immune	Toni	Eliminated (Day 42)									0
Tamara	Not in game	Immune	Toni	Sonia	Diego	Immune	Left Competition (Day 35)										3
Kiko	Aída	Sonia	Jacobo	Sonia	Diego	Immune	Left Competition (Day 35)										4
Xexu	Aída	Reyes	Jacobo	Tamara	Diego	Nominated	Eliminated (Day 35)										0
Diego	Reyes	Reyes	Tatiana	Tatiana	Emma	Purgatory	Eliminated (Day 32)										9
Reyes	Kiko	Toni	Purgatory				Eliminated (Day 32)										11
Jacobo	Aída	Sonia	Sonia	Eliminated (Day 21)													4
Aída	Jacobo	Purgatory	Eliminated (Day 14)							Guest (Day 56-70)		Out (Day 70)					6
Notes	See note 1	See note 1, 2, 3	See note 1, 4, 5	See note 1, 6, 7	See note 8, 9		See note 10	See note 11	See note 12	See note 13	See note 14	See note 15	See note 16	See note 17	None		
Nominated by Tribe		Reyes	Sonia	Sonia			Toni	Emma	Carolina	Sonia; Toni	Sonia; Toni	Jéssica; Rosa		Rosi			
Nominated by Leader		Sonia	Jacobo	Tamara			Montalvo	Toni	Arturo	Arturo	Rosa	Sonia		Sonia			
Nominated	Aída; Reyes	Reyes; Sonia	Jacobo; Sonia	Sonia; Tamara; Toni	All; Anonymous		Montalvo; Toni	Emma; Toni	Arturo; Carolina	Arturo; Sonia; Toni	Rosa; Sonia; Toni	Jéssica; Rosa; Sonia	All; Contestants	Rosi; Sonia	Rosa; Tatiana	Rosa; Rosi	
Eliminated	Aída; 87% to move	Reyes; 57% to move	Jacobo; 68% to move	Toni; Most votes to move	Diego; 9 of 13 votes to move	Xexu; Most votes to eliminate	Montalvo; Most votes to eliminate	Emma; 52% to eliminate	Carolina; Most votes to eliminate	Arturo; Most votes to eliminate	Toni; Most votes to eliminate	Jéssica; Most votes to eliminate	Jeyko; Most votes to eliminate	Sonia; 66% to eliminate	Tatiana; Most votes to eliminate	Rosi; 32% to win	
Eliminated	Aída; 87% to move	Reyes; 57% to move	Jacobo; 68% to move	Toni; Most votes to move	Diego; 9 of 13 votes to move	Xexu; Most votes to eliminate	Montalvo; Most votes to eliminate	Emma; 52% to eliminate	Carolina; Most votes to eliminate	Arturo; Most votes to eliminate	Toni; Most votes to eliminate	Jéssica; Most votes to eliminate	Jeyko; Most votes to eliminate	Sonia; 66% to eliminate	Tatiana; Most votes to eliminate	Rosa; 68% to win	
Purgatory Nominated		Aída; Reyes	Jacobo; Reyes		Diego; Reyes; Toni												
Purgatory Eliminated		Aída; 4 of 6 votes to eliminate	Jacobo; 6 of 6 votes to eliminate		Diego; Fewest votes to re-enter												
Purgatory Eliminated		Aída; 4 of 6 votes to eliminate	Jacobo; 6 of 6 votes to eliminate		Reyes; Fewest votes to re-enter												

- Inhabitant of Purgatory (ghost ship or beach Cabeza de León)
- Contestant was immune
- Contestant was leader and whoever they nominated would automatically face elimination (Immune)

=== Notes ===
- ^Note 1: In rounds one through four, all non-celebrity contestants were immune from elimination.
- ^Note 2: As the winner of the immunity challenge, Jacobo was given the power to name a nominee.
- ^Note 3: Aída was evicted from Purgatory by the Anonymous following a vote to eliminate.
- ^Note 4: As the winner of the immunity challenge, Jose was given the power to name a nominee.
- ^Note 5: Jacobo was evicted from Purgatory by the Anonymous following a vote to eliminate.
- ^Note 6: As the winner of the immunity challenge, Jose was given the power to name a nominee.
- ^Note 7: In the fourth round of nominations, Toni was automatically nominated for eviction due to rule breaking.
- ^Note 8: In the fifth round of nominations, all Famous contestants were immune from elimination and could vote to eliminate one of the Anonymous in the event of a tie.
- ^Note 9: In the fifth round of nominations, all Anonymous contestants had to vote to eliminate a fellow Anonymous contestant. Following the vote the remaining Anonymous were automatically nominated in a vote to eliminate.
- ^Note 10: As the winner of the immunity challenge, Sonia was given the power to name a nominee.
- ^Note 11: As the winner of the immunity challenge, Rosi was given the power to name a nominee.
- ^Note 12: As the winner of the immunity challenge, Sonia was given the power to name a nominee.
- ^Note 13: As the winner of the immunity challenge, Jeyko was given the power to name a nominee.
- ^Note 14: As the winner of the immunity challenge, Jeyko was given the power to name a nominee.
- ^Note 15: As the winner of the immunity challenge, Tatiana was given the power to name a nominee.
- ^Note 16: All contestants were automatically nominated for elimination.
- ^Note 17: As the winner of the immunity challenge, Tatiana was given the power to name a nominee.
