= Catherine McQueen =

Catherine McQueen (born 11 August 1978 in Edinburgh), is a Scottish model, part-time actress, TV presenter and DJ.

== Biography ==
Catherine reached the final of an Elite Model Look competition at the age of sixteen, but her parents insisted she finish studying for her Highers instead of starting modelling. Educated at Edinburgh Academy with a degree in Law and Business from City University London. She completed the Legal Practice Course (LPC) at The College of Law, London. Her modelling work includes photoshoots for Chanel and Dior, as well as Scottish wonder bra manufacturer Ultimo.

McQueen had a minor role in the Pierce Brosnan James Bond movie Die Another Day as a Russian model. In 2002, she attended the gala opening party for Le Touessrok Hotel in Mauritius. She sang on the dance track "Time after Time" by Koishii & Hush which reached No. 15 in the US Billboard Dance/Club Play Song chart in April 2007. The Bond role has resulted in extra promotion of McQueen's work as a DJ, work she took up after the Writers Guild of America's strike in 2007–08.

McQueen is a non-executive director at The Reading Room, a digital media agency that she invested in 1999 when she was still modelling.

== Filmography ==
As well as her appearance in Die Another Day, McQueen presented for programmes including The Big Breakfast, Sky Vegas, Sky Sports and MTV. She has had acting roles in The Bill and Judge John Deed.
