= Brenda Emmanus =

British journalist and broadcaster

Brenda Emmanus OBE
- Education: University of Westminster
- Occupations: Journalist; radio and television broadcaster
- Website: brendaemmanus.com

Brenda Emmanus OBE is a British journalist, and radio and television broadcaster. She also hosts live shows and events. Her work ranges across topics such as news and current affairs, fashion, interior design, consumer issues, and, in particular, entertainment and the arts. She has worked for the BBC's local, national and worldwide platforms as well as for Sky, Channel 4 and ITV. She was the Arts, Culture and Entertainment Correspondent for BBC London News.

== Training and career ==
Emmanus was born to Saint Lucian parents and grew up in Camberwell in southeast London, England. Her teachers thought she should be an actor but, after a short spell in the youth drama group of an established theatre, she decided it was not for her. Emmanus gained a degree in Media and Communication from what is now the University of Westminster. While she was studying, she freelanced with The Voice newspaper as a student journalist. After graduation, she joined the team of the newspaper full-time, later becoming their Arts and Features editor.

She started her 18-year-long career with the BBC as a researcher for Kilroy, a morning chat show. She then worked under Janet Street-Porter on reportage for youth programmes.

Emmanus is perhaps best known as co-presenter of the BBC fashion programme The Clothes Show from 1993 to 1996. The show was watched by more than 10 million viewers. Emmanus worked on the interior design programme The Terrace, and on The Midweek National Lottery on BBC One. She was also one of the main presenters on Healthy Holidays and Money Makeovers for Granada and Sky Television. She has appeared regularly on ITV's This Morning, teaming up with the hosts Judy Finnigan and Richard Madeley as fashion and entertainment expert. Emmanus was the Arts, Culture and Entertainment Correspondent for BBC London News. Emmanus was a visiting professor at the London College of Fashion. In 2018, in collaboration with Sonia Boyce she presented the BBC Four show Whoever Heard of a Black Artist? Britain's Hidden Art History. Emmanus has completed a Clore Arts Leadership Programme. She worked as a Channel Executive for BBC2, while making arts documentaries. With Sadler's Wells, Emmanus has made a six-part podcast featuring conversations with successful black creative artists.

Emmanus is often sought after as a mentor to young people wishing to enter the world of broadcasting.

Emmanus has worked on documentaries such as Charles I: Treasures Reunited (BBC2), New Tate Modern: Switched On. co-presented with Andrew Marr (BBC2), The Brits Who Designed the Modern World (BBC Four), Diana: Designing a Princess (BBC2) and Who Ever Heard of a Black Artist? (BBC Four). Emmanus has also presented the Royal Academy Summer Exhibition Specials with Kirsty Wark. Emmanus has presented The Early Show for BBC Radio 2 and Megamix for the BBC World Service, as well as The Cultural Frontline for BBC World. She worked as an Arts, Culture and Entertainment Correspondent for BBC London and BBC Network news.

Emmanus has hosted live shows, including for Ernst and Young, The British Film Institute, The National Theatre, The WOW (Women of the World) Festival, The Art Fund, Frieze Art Fair, The Powerlist and Sadler's Wells Theatre. Emmanus has interviewed many well-known people, among them Oprah Winfrey, Sir Elton John, Will Smith, Angelina Jolie, Daniel Craig, Robert Redford and Clint Eastwood. Emmanus's subjects for TV features have included David Hockney, Sir Frank Bowling, the late Whitney Houston and Amy Winehouse, Jean Paul Gaultier, Edward Enninful and Sir Steve McQueen.

Emmanus is chair of the Board of Trustees for Sir Matthew Bourne's New Adventures Dance Company. She is also a founding member and vice chair of the Creative Industries Alliance, patron of The Black Women's Network and on the Board of Action for Diversity and Development. She was vice chair, then president of BBC Embrace while employed by the corporation. She is a founding patron of the Black British Theatre Awards. In 2022, Emmanus was appointed a non-executive director of the board of independent publishing company Faber.

Emmanus has judged Museum of the Year, The Stroke Association's Creative Arts Awards, The Visionary Honours Awards and The Jack Petchey Foundation's Glee and Speak Out competitions.

Emmanus has directed and presented a series of six short films, entitled My Saint Lucia, celebrating the Caribbean island where her parents were born.

== Personal life ==
Emmanus has a daughter called Marley. Emmanus has two regional championship silver medals for Taekwondo.

== Awards and commendations ==
Emmanus was appointed an OBE for services to Broadcasting and Diversity in the 2019 Birthday Honours. She received an Honorary Doctorate from the University of the Arts in 2020.

Emmanus was visiting professor at the University of the Arts (2016). Legacy Award (2018). Baton Award for Outstanding Achievement in the Media. Community Honours Award at the House of Lords (2018). The Voice Most Influential Woman in Arts Broadcasting (2019). In 2024, Emmanus was included in the exhibition 100 Black Women who have made a mark, which was curated by the Serendipity Institute for Black Arts and Heritage. Emmanus is one of Robert Elms Listed Londoners.
