= Cirque de Celebrité =

- Presented by: Ruby Wax (2006); Jenni Falconer (2007); Brian Dowling (spin off)
- Judges: Louie Spence; Phillip Gandey; Ann Dorwin (2006); Gaby Roslin (2007); Syed Ahmed (guest judge, 2006)
- Country of origin: United Kingdom
- Original language: English
- No. of series: 2
- No. of episodes: 20

Production
- Producer: Love Productions
- Running time: 60 minutes

Original release
- Network: Sky One
- Release: 15 October 2006 – 9 December 2007

Related
- Cirque: Backstage at the Big Top; Celebrity Circus (Australian TV series); Celebrity Circus (American TV series)

Cirque de Celebrité is a celebrity reality television show broadcast on Sky One. The show features celebrities training for and then performing various circus acts. The winner of the series of 2006 was Grace Adams-Short.

A second series of Cirque de Celebrité broadcast in 2007, with Jenni Falconer replacing Ruby Wax as host and the live commentator was Peter Dickson. Big Brother winner Brian Dowling hosted a spin off show, Cirque: Backstage at the Big Top. The winner of the series of 2007 was Kyal Marsh.

== Format ==
The first series was hosted by Ruby Wax. The three judges for the first series were professional performers Louie Spence, Ann Dorwin, and circus director, Phillip Gandey. Gaby Roslin replaced Ann Dorwin for the second series. The celebrities were trained to perform various circus acts, and compete with each other for points from the judges and phone votes from the public on premium rated lines.

The acts were interspersed with compère banter and video from the training sessions and interviews. The two scores were combined, 50% judges vote and 50% phone votes, and the two lowest scoring participants were candidates for expulsion. According to the website of Sky One, the judges nominated one of the saved celebrities to eliminate one of the two contestants at the bottom of the scoreboard.

In the first two weeks only, reference was made to the highest scoring celebrity choosing between the two.

== Ratings ==
Cirque de Celebrité 1 was watched by a peak of 817,000 viewers. However, Cirque de Celebrité 2 averaged considerably less, peaking at around 400,000 viewers.

== Series 1 (2006) ==
=== Participants ===
The line up of celebrities in Series 1 were:

Celebrity	Famous for	Result
Mark Bright	Former England Footballer	Eliminated on Week 1
Syed Ahmed	The Apprentice Contestant	Eliminated on Week 2
Sinitta	Singer & The X Factor Mentor	Eliminated on Week 3
Nicola Wheeler	Emmerdale Actress	Eliminated on Week 5
Sophie Anderton	Glamour Model	Withdrew due to injury
Ninia Benjamin	Comedian	Eliminated on Week 6
Lee MacDonald	Grange Hill Actor	Week 4, returned to replace Sophie, eliminated Week 7
Jamie Baulch	Former Olympic Sprinter	Eliminated on Week 8
Andy Kane	Changing Rooms Presenter	Eliminated on Week 9
Kenzie	Blazin' Squad & Friday Hill Rapper	Final Week (3rd)
Emma B	Model	Final Week (2nd)
Grace Adams-Short	Big Brother 2006 Contestant	Final Week (Winner)

==== Guest stars ====
- Simon Cowell (X Factor Judge), supporting ex-girlfriend Sinitta.
- Carol Smillie (Changing Rooms Presenter), supporting Andy Kane.
- Mikey Dalton (Big Brother 2006 Contestant), supporting his fiancée, Grace Adams-Short.

=== Elimination ===
Week	Celebrity												Notes
10 (The Final)	Grace	Emma	Kenzie										^{4}
9	Grace	Emma	Kenzie	Andy									None
8	Grace	Emma	Kenzie	Andy	Jamie								None
7	Grace	Emma	Kenzie	Andy	Jamie	Lee							^{3}
6	Grace	Emma	Kenzie	Andy	Jamie	Lee	Ninia						^{2}
5	Grace	Emma	Kenzie	Andy	Jamie	Sophie	Ninia	Nicola					None
4	Grace	Emma	Kenzie	Andy	Jamie	Sophie	Ninia	Nicola	Lee				^{1}
3	Grace	Emma	Kenzie	Andy	Jamie	Sophie	Ninia	Nicola	Lee	Sinitta			None
2	Grace	Emma	Kenzie	Andy	Jamie	Sophie	Ninia	Nicola	Lee	Sinitta	Syed		None
1	Grace	Emma	Kenzie	Andy	Jamie	Sophie	Ninia	Nicola	Lee	Sinitta	Syed	Mark	None

The celebrity was voted off after being in the bottom two.
The other celebrity in the bottom two.
The celebrity chosen to decide who is eliminated.
The celebrity who won.

^1 In Week 4, Syed Ahmed was guest judge replacing Louie Spence.
^2 After the departure of Sophie Anderton in week 6 due to injury, Lee McDonald was reintroduced with immunity from eviction.
^3 In Week 7, Ninia Benjamin was re introduced into the show as "Kenzie's personal trainer." She also took part in the group performance and accompanied contestants off stage after each of their performances.
^4 In the final week Grace broke her foot, however, she still took part and performed in the show. Grace went on to win the show with 70% of the audience vote, with Emma B and Kenzie finishing in second and third place respectively.

=== Other information ===
- The name of the show is grammatically incorrect French for Celebrity Circus, the actual French would be Cirque de Célébrité.
- The first celebrity voted out was Mark Bright, who was reportedly furious over the decision.

== Series 2 (2007) ==
=== Changes ===
For the second series, GMTV host Jenni Falconer replaced Ruby Wax as the ring mistress. Gaby Roslin also replaced Ann Dorwin on the judging panel, alongside Phillip and Louie. That year up until Week 6, the judges did not give the contestants scores for their performances.

That year two new celebrities joined the circus over halfway into the show. Liam McGough, an ex housemate on Big Brother, and Rebecca Loos joined the show in Week 6, due to Shane Lynch quitting after injury. They both performed on 11 November 2007 and the public voted to see which one they would like to see back as an official contestant the following week. Liam was chosen to stay in the competition and Rebecca was sent home, however Liam was voted off in the same episode.

=== Scores ===
Week 1–5:

- The judges did not give the contestants scores for their performances.

Week 6:

- Luke – 27
- Isabella – 26
- Antonia – 21
- Stacey – 19
- Kyal – 18
- Dean – 16

Week 7:

- Kyal – 30
- Stacey – 25
- Antonia – 23
- Isabella – 20
- Luke – 19
- Liam – 16

Week 8:

- Kyal – 57
- Stacey – 45
- Antonia – 43
- Luke – 42
- Isabella – 28

Week 9:

- Kyal – 55
- Stacey – 46
- Luke – 46
- Antonia – 36

Week 10 (Finals):

- Stacey – 57
- Kyal – 57
- Luke – 53

=== Participants ===
The line up of celebrities in Series 2 were follows:

Celebrity	Famous for	Result
Dwain Chambers	Former Olympic Track Sprinter	Eliminated on Week 2
Hannah Waterman	EastEnders Actress	Eliminated on Week 3
Tamara Czartoryska	Model & Reality Television Star	Eliminated on Week 4
Emily Scott	Swimsuit Model	Eliminated on Week 4
Ritchie Neville	Former Five Singer	Eliminated on Week 5
Shane Lynch	Boyzone Singer	Withdrew due to injury
Dean Holdsworth	Professional Footballer	Eliminated on Week 6
Liam McGough	Big Brother Contestant	Eliminated on Week 7
Lady Isabella Hervey	Model & Socialite	Eliminated on Week 8
Antonia Okonma	Bad Girls Actress	Eliminated on Week 9
Luke Bailey	Casualty Actor	Final Week – 3rd
Stacey Cadman	Actress & Television Presenter	Final Week – 2nd
Kyal Marsh	Neighbours Actor & Model	Final Week – Winner

=== Elimination ===
Week	Celebrity													Notes
10 (The Final)	Kyal	Stacey	Luke											None
9	Kyal	Stacey	Luke	Antonia										None
8	Kyal	Stacey	Luke	Antonia	Isabella									None
7	Kyal	Stacey	Luke	Antonia	Isabella	Liam								^{6}
6	Kyal	Stacey	Luke	Antonia	Isabella	N/A	Dean	Shane						^{5}
5	Kyal	Stacey	Luke	Antonia	Isabella	N/A	Dean	Shane	Ritchie					^{4}
4	Kyal	Stacey	Luke	Antonia	Isabella	N/A	Dean	Shane	Ritchie	Emily	Tamara			^{3}
3	Kyal	Stacey	Luke	Antonia	Isabella	N/A	Dean	Shane	Ritchie	Emily	Tamara	Hannah		^{2}
2	Kyal	Stacey	Luke	Antonia	Isabella	N/A	Dean	Shane	Ritchie	Emily	Tamara	Hannah	Dwain	None
1	Kyal	Stacey	Luke	Antonia	Isabella	N/A	Dean	Shane	Ritchie	Emily	Tamara	Hannah	Dwain	^{1}

The Celebrity was voted off after being in the bottom two.
The Celebrity in the bottom two that the judges decided to save.
The Celebrity withdrew from the competition due to injury.
The Celebrity that won.

^1 Dean was voted off the show in Week 1. However, Sky confirmed that there was an error with the voting, and Dean was invited back to Cirque de Celebrité.
^2 Ritchie Neville was not able to take part this week because of an injury he got in training.
^3 This week was a double elimination week, with two contestants being eliminated.
^4 Shane Lynch was not able to take part this week because of an injury he got in training.
^5 Shane Lynch withdrew from the competition, due to injury.
^6 Liam had entered the circus, to replace Shane Lynch.

== Transmissions ==
Series	Start date	End date	Episodes
1	15 October 2006	17 December 2006	10
2	7 October 2007	9 December 2007	10
