= DEF II =

Programming strand on BBC2

- Network: BBC Two
- Launched: 9 May 1988; 38 years ago
- Closed: 23 May 1994; 32 years ago
- Country of origin: United Kingdom
- Key people: Janet Street-Porter
- Format: Programming to serve the teenage market
- Original language: English

DEF II was a programming strand on BBC2, which aired at 6 pm on Mondays and Wednesdays from 9 May 1988 to 23 May 1994, to serve the teenage market. It was produced by Janet Street-Porter, and followed on from her youth television show Network 7 on Channel 4.

Many of the presenters and staff on DEF II started their careers on Network 7 and had followed Street-Porter when she was "poached" by the BBC. It had an ident featuring a barcode which differed from the usual idents used on BBC2.

== DEF II shows ==
Programmes shown as part of DEF II included both original content, such as Reportage, as well as those licensed from other networks, such as The Fresh Prince of Bel-Air and Gimme 5. One of the most successful was Dance Energy presented by Normski, featuring dance and black music culture, live studio acts, and fashion.

Programme shown on DEF II included:

- Babylon II
- DEF II: EXTRA!
- Battlestar Galactica (Continued on BBC2 until 2001)
- The Big Trip (1994–1996)
- Buck Rogers in the 25th Century (Continued on BBC2 until 1997)
- Cyberzone
- Dance Energy
- Degrassi Junior High (1988; Four episodes, three BBC1 had not screened previously, plus one repeat)
- The Fresh Prince of Bel-Air (Continued on BBC2 until 2004)
- Gimme 5 (presented by Jovanotti aka Gino Latino)
- Goggle Eyes
- The Invaders (Continued on BBC2 until the late 1990s)
- Les Lives!
- Liquid Television
- The Living Soap
- Mission: Impossible (Continued on BBC2 until the late 1990s)
- Open to Question
- Rapido
- The Real McCoy (Continued on BBC2 until 1996)
- The Ren & Stimpy Show (Continued on BBC2 until 1999)
- Reportage
- Rough Guides to the World
- Standing Room Only
- Snub TV
- Wayne's World (not the films but the Saturday Night Live sketches. Approx 10-minute slots)

== See also ==
- BBC Switch, BBC Two's second programming block aimed at teenagers
