= GBZ =

GBZ may refer to:

- Criggion Radio Station, a defunct British VLF transmitter
- Centre for British Studies (German: Großbritannienzentrum), Humboldt University of Berlin
- Great Barrier Aerodrome, on Great Barrier Island, New Zealand
- Guanabenz, an antihypertensive drug
- The international vehicle registration code for Gibraltar
- Zoroastrian Dari language
