= Humboldt University of Berlin =

Public university in Berlin, Germany

- Humboldt-Universität zu Berlin
- Seal of the Universitas Humboldtiana Berolinensis (Latin)
- Former names: Universität zu Berlin (1809–1827); Friedrich-Wilhelms-Universität zu Berlin (1828–1948)
- Motto: Universitas litterarum (Latin)
- Motto in English: The University of Letters
- Type: Public
- Established: 15 October 1810; 216 years ago
- Affiliations: German Universities Excellence Initiative; UNICA; U15; Atomium Culture; EUA; IAU; FGU; Erasmus
- Budget: EUR 536.0 million (2022)
- President: Julia von Blumenthal
- Academic staff: 2,403
- Administrative staff: 1,516
- Students: 37,222
- Undergraduates: 18,712
- Postgraduates: 10,881
- Doctoral students: 2,951
- Location: Berlin, Germany; 52°31′05″N 13°23′36″E
- Campus: Urban and suburban
- Nobel Laureates: 57 (as of 2020)
- Colors: Blue and white
- Website: hu-berlin.de
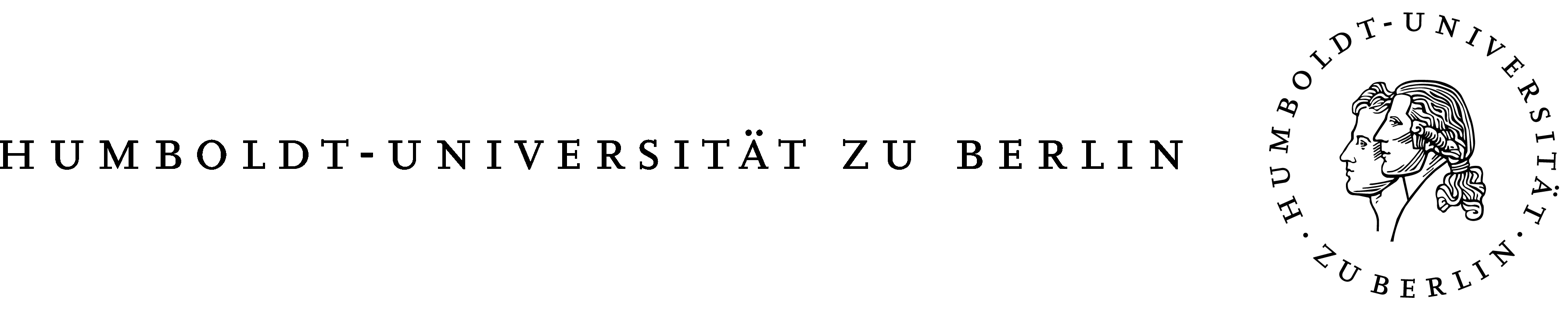

- Location within Germany Location within Berlin

The Humboldt University of Berlin (German: Humboldt-Universität zu Berlin, abbreviated HU Berlin) is a public research university in the central borough of Mitte in Berlin, Germany.

The university was established by Frederick William III on the initiative of Wilhelm von Humboldt, Johann Gottlieb Fichte and Friedrich Daniel Ernst Schleiermacher as the University of Berlin (Universität zu Berlin) in 1809, and opened in 1810. From 1828 until its closure in 1945, it was named the (Royal) Friedrich Wilhelm University of Berlin (FWU Berlin; German: Königliche Friedrich-Wilhelms-Universität zu Berlin). During the Cold War, the university found itself in East Berlin and was de facto split in two when the Free University of Berlin opened in West Berlin. The university received its current name in honour of Alexander and Wilhelm von Humboldt in 1949.

The university is divided into nine faculties, including its medical school shared with the Free University of Berlin. The university has a student enrollment of around 35,000 students, and offers degree programs in some 171 disciplines from undergraduate to post-doctorate level. Its main campus is located on the Unter den Linden boulevard in central Berlin. The university is known worldwide for pioneering the Humboldtian model of higher education, which has strongly influenced other European and Western universities.

It is generally regarded as having been the world's preeminent university for the natural sciences during the 19th and early 20th centuries; it is linked to major breakthroughs in physics and other sciences by its professors, such as Albert Einstein. Past and present faculty and notable alumni include 57 Nobel Prize laureates (the most of any German university), as well as scholars and academics including Johannes Müller, Theodor Schwann, Rudolf Virchow, Hermann von Helmholtz, Emil du Bois-Reymond, Robert Koch, Theodor Mommsen, Karl Marx, Friedrich Engels, Otto von Bismarck, W. E. B. Du Bois, Arthur Schopenhauer, Georg Wilhelm Friedrich Hegel, Jacob Burckhardt, Walter Benjamin, Max Weber, Georg Simmel, Karl Liebknecht, Ernst Cassirer, Heinrich Heine, Ivan Turgenev, Eduard Fraenkel, Max Planck, Wernher von Braun and the Brothers Grimm.

== History ==
=== Main building ===
The main building of Humboldt-Universität is the Prinz-Heinrich-Palais (English: Prince Henry's Palace) on Unter den Linden boulevard in the historic centre of Berlin. It was erected from 1748 to 1753 for Prince Henry of Prussia, the brother of Frederick the Great, according to plans by Johann Boumann in Baroque style. In 1809, the former Royal Prussian residence was converted into a university building. Damaged during the Allied bombing in World War II, it was rebuilt from 1949 to 1962.

In 1967, eight statues from the destroyed Potsdam City Palace were placed on the side wings of the university building. Currently, there is a discussion about returning the statues to the Potsdam City Palace, which was rebuilt as the Landtag of Brandenburg in 2013.

=== Early history ===
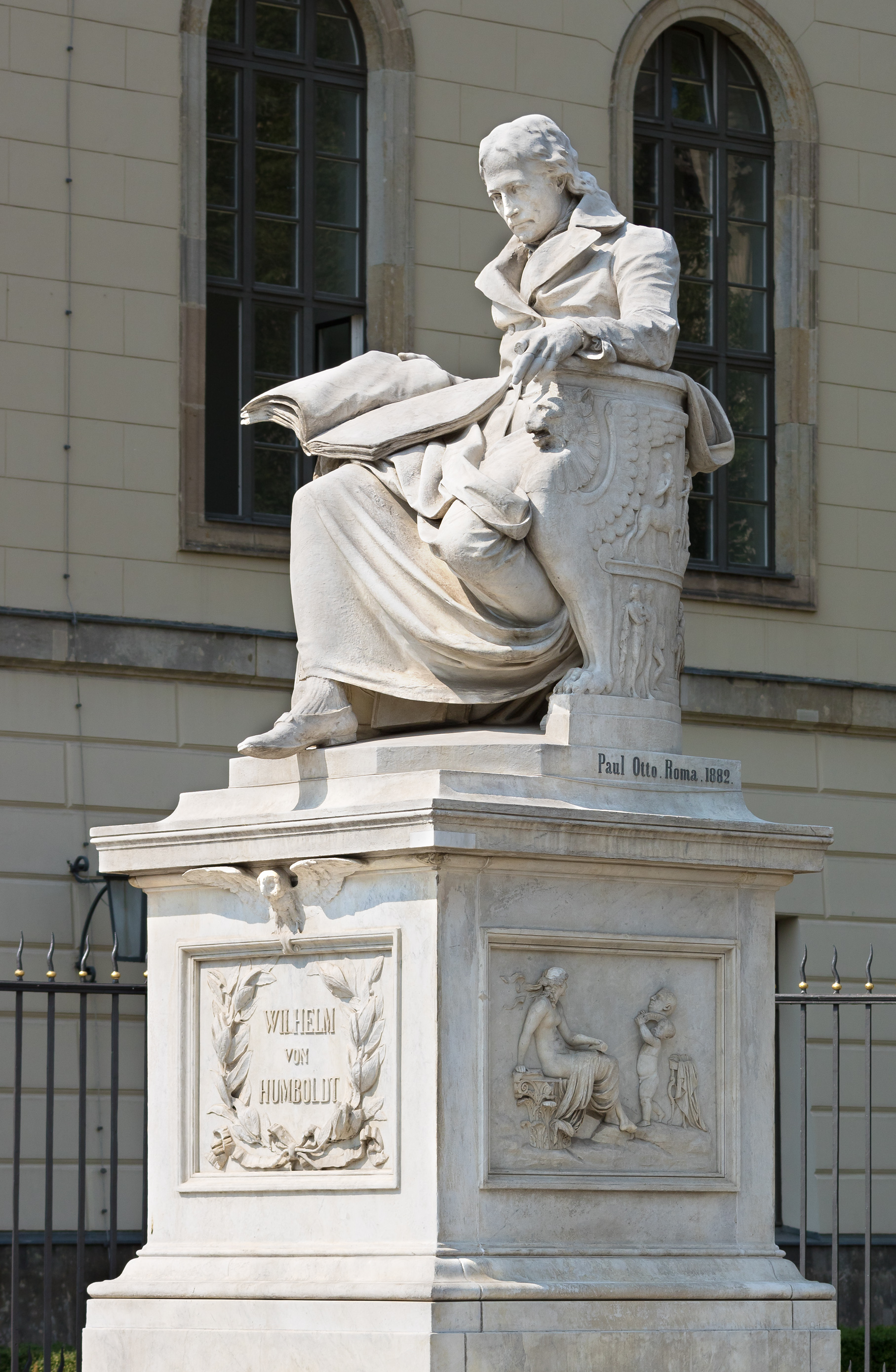
Wilhelm von Humboldt Memorial, Berlin in front of the main building by artist Paul Otto

Similarly to the University of Bonn, the University of Berlin was established by King Friedrich Wilhelm III on 16 August 1809, during the period of the Prussian Reform Movement, on the initiative of the liberal Prussian philosopher and linguist Wilhelm von Humboldt. The university was located in a palace constructed from 1748 to 1766 for the late Prince Henry, the younger brother of Frederick the Great. After his widow and her ninety-member staff moved out, the first unofficial lectures were given in the building in the winter of 1809. Humboldt faced great resistance to his ideas as he set up the university. He submitted his resignation to the King in April 1810, and was not present when the school opened that fall.

The first students were admitted on 6 October 1810, and the first semester started on 10 October 1810, with 256 students and 52 lecturers in faculties of law, medicine, theology and philosophy under rector Theodor Schmalz. The university celebrates 15 October 1810 as the date of its opening. In 1810, at the time of the opening, the university established the first academic chair in the field of history in the world. From 1828 to 1945, the school was named the "Royal Friedrich Wilhelm University of Berlin", in honor of its founder. Ludwig Feuerbach, then one of the students, made a comment about the university in 1826:

"There is no question here of drinking, duelling and pleasant communal outings; in no other university can you find such a passion for work, such an interest for things that are not petty student intrigues, such an inclination for the sciences, such calm and such silence. Compared to this temple of work, the other universities appear like public houses."

The university has been home to many of Germany's greatest thinkers of the past two centuries, among them subjective idealist philosopher Johann Gottlieb Fichte, theologian Friedrich Schleiermacher, absolute idealist philosopher G. W. F. Hegel, Romantic legal theorist Friedrich Carl von Savigny, anti-optimist philosopher Arthur Schopenhauer, objective idealist philosopher Friedrich Schelling, cultural critic Walter Benjamin, and leading physicists Albert Einstein and Max Planck.

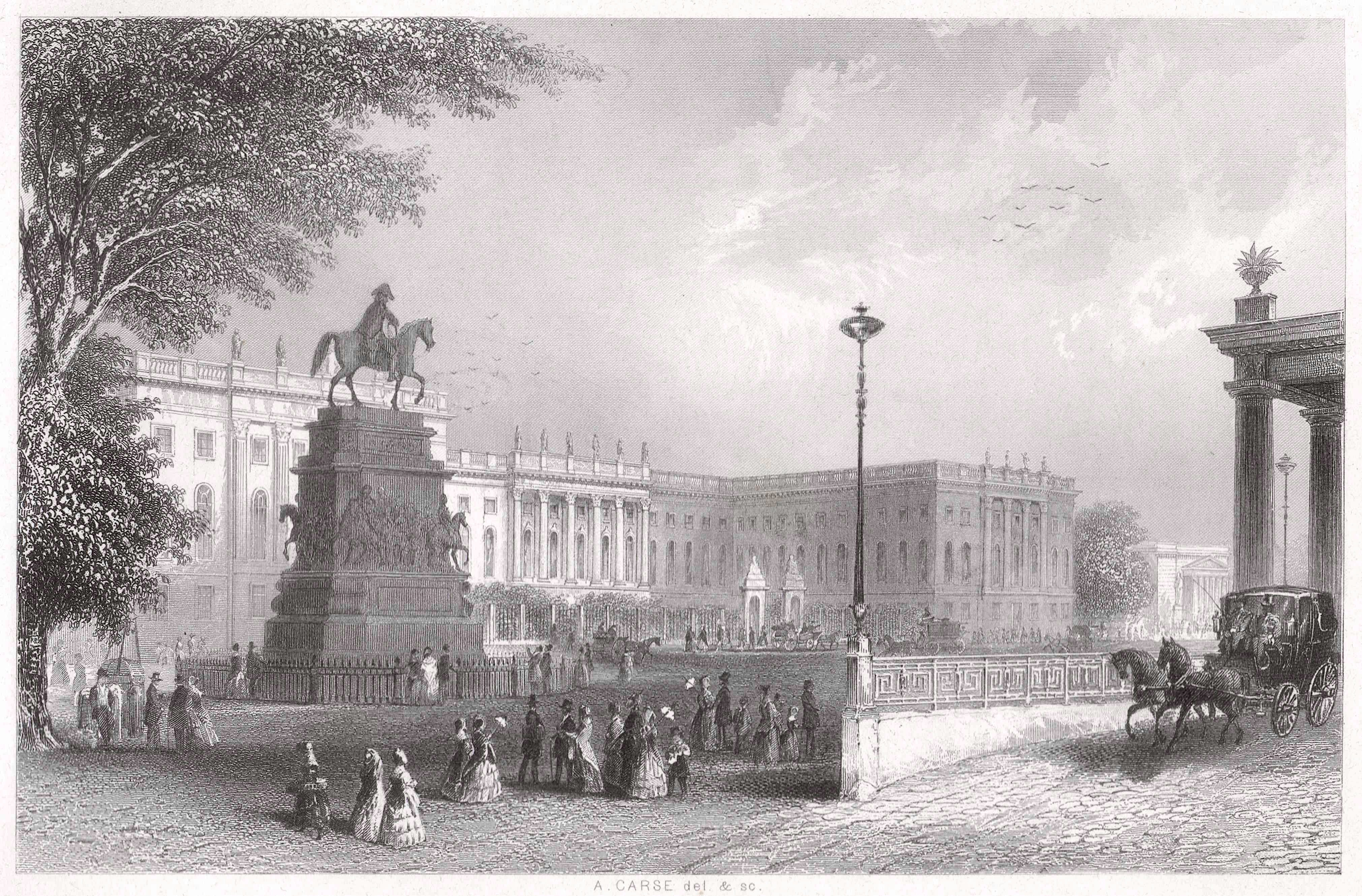
Friedrich Wilhelm University in 1850

The founders of Marxist theory Karl Marx and Friedrich Engels attended the university, as did poet Heinrich Heine, novelist Alfred Döblin, founder of structuralism Ferdinand de Saussure, German unifier Otto von Bismarck, Communist Party of Germany founder Karl Liebknecht, African American Pan-Africanist W. E. B. Du Bois, and European unifier Robert Schuman, as well as influential surgeon Johann Friedrich Dieffenbach in the early half of the 1800s.

The structure of German research-intensive universities served as a model for institutions like Johns Hopkins University. Further, it has been claimed that "the 'Humboldtian' university became a model for the rest of Europe [...] with its central principle being the union of teaching and research in the work of the individual scholar or scientist."

=== Enlargement ===
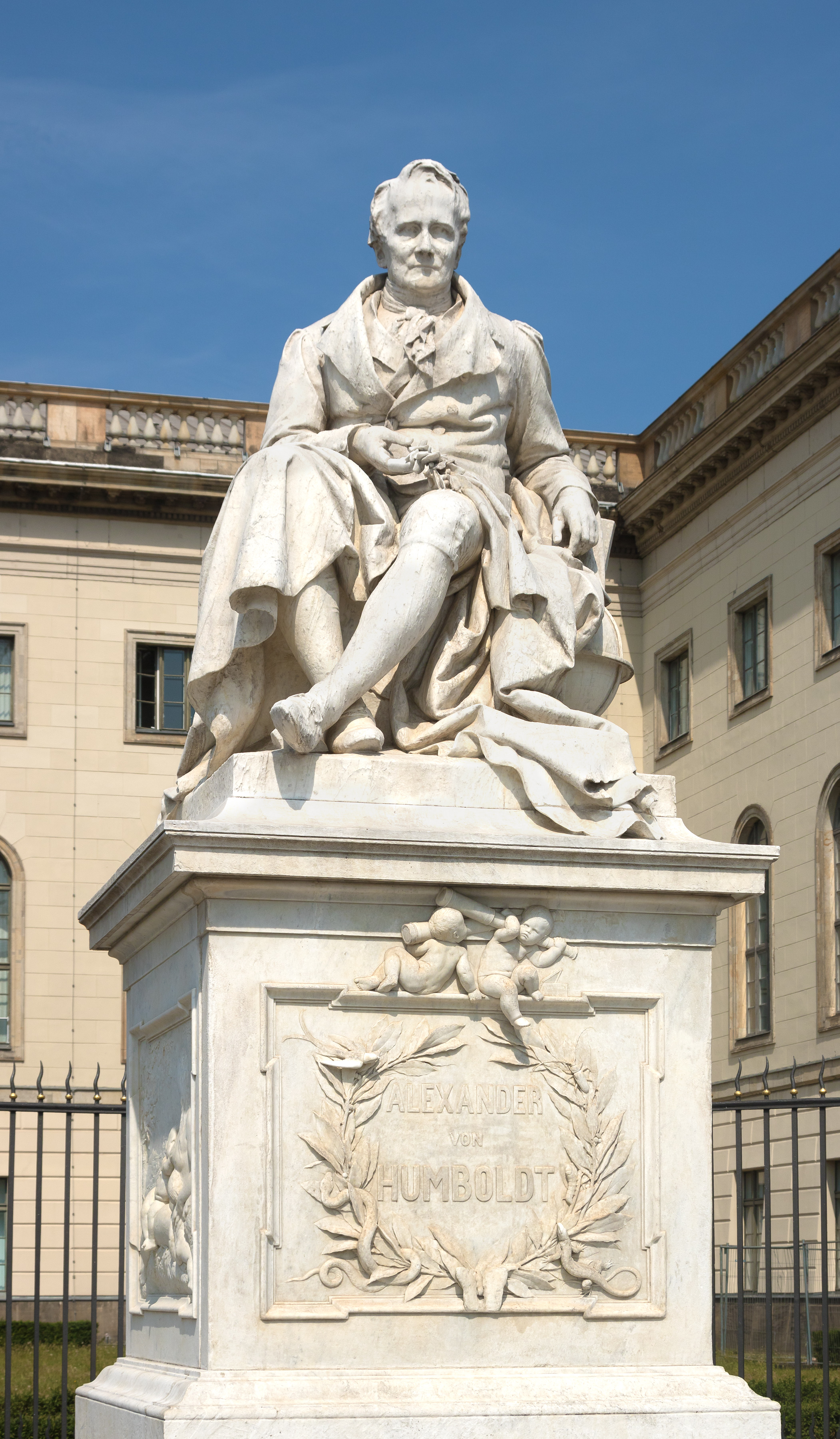
Statue of Alexander von Humboldt outside Humboldt-Universität (Reinhold Begas, 1883)

In addition to the strong anchoring of traditional subjects, such as science, law, philosophy, history, theology and medicine, the university developed to encompass numerous new scientific disciplines. Alexander von Humboldt, brother of the founder William, promoted the new learning. The construction of modern research facilities in the second half of the 19th century aided the teaching of the natural sciences. Famous researchers, such as the chemist August Wilhelm Hofmann, the physicist Hermann von Helmholtz, the mathematicians Ernst Eduard Kummer, Leopold Kronecker, Karl Weierstrass, the physicians Johannes Peter Müller, Emil du Bois-Reymond, Albrecht von Graefe, Rudolf Virchow, and Robert Koch, contributed to Berlin University's scientific fame.

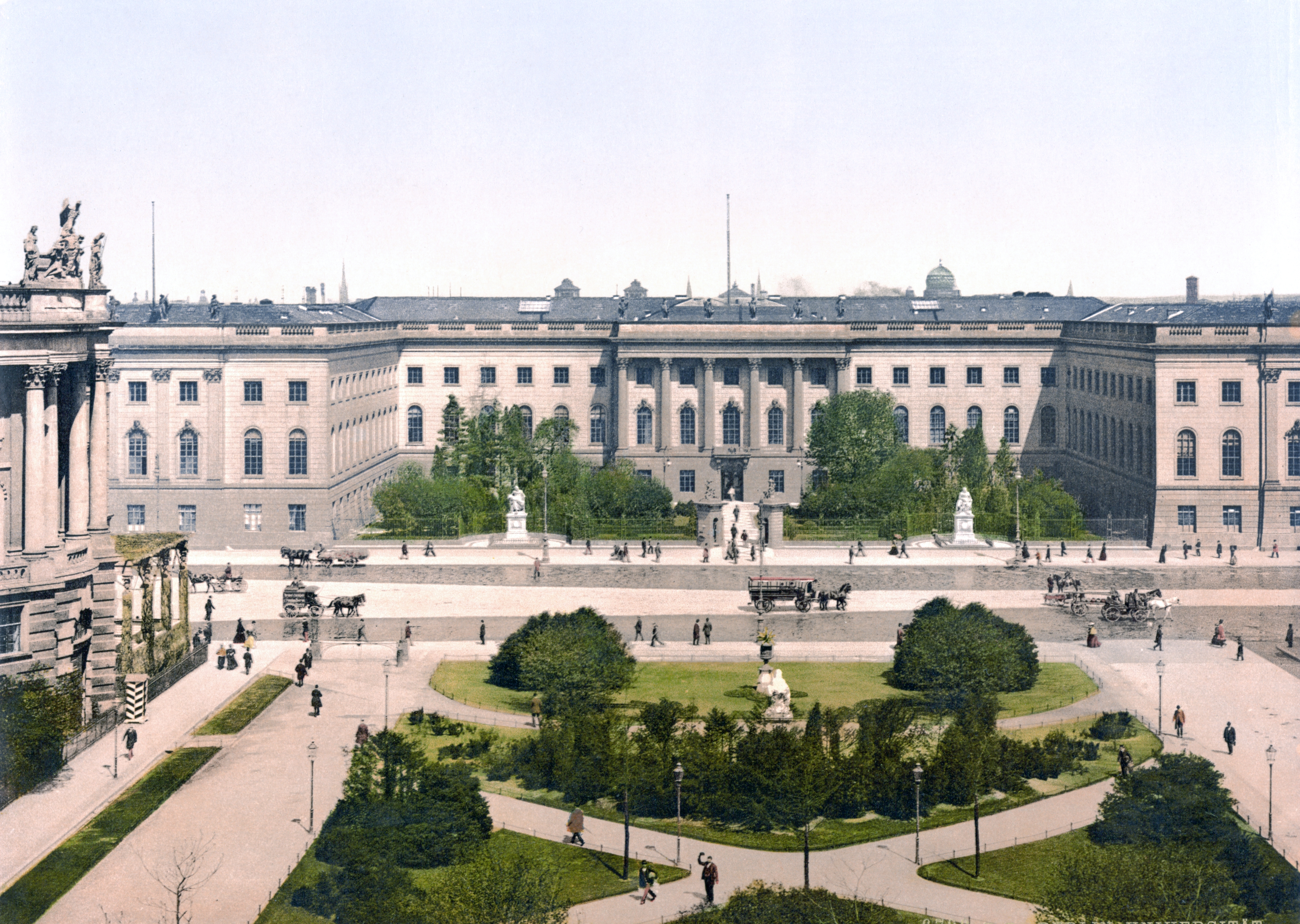
Friedrich Wilhelm University, (photochrom, 1900)

During this period of enlargement, the university gradually expanded to incorporate other previously separate colleges in Berlin. An example would be the Charité, the Pépinière and the Collegium Medico-chirurgicum. In 1710, King Friedrich I had built a quarantine house for Plague at the city gates, which in 1727 was rechristened by the "soldier king" Friedrich Wilhelm: "Es soll das Haus die Charité heißen" (called Charité [French for charity]). By 1829, the site became Friedrich Wilhelm University's medical campus and remained so until 1927, when the more modern University Hospital was constructed.

The university began a natural history collection in 1810, which by 1889 required a separate building and became the Museum für Naturkunde. The preexisting Tierarznei School, founded in 1790 and absorbed by the university, in 1934 formed the basis of the Veterinary Medicine Facility (Grundstock der Veterinärmedizinischen Fakultät). Also, the Landwirtschaftliche Hochschule Berlin (Agricultural University of Berlin), founded in 1881, was affiliated with the Agricultural Faculties of the university.

In August 1870, in a speech delivered on the eve of war with France, Emil du Bois-Reymond proclaimed that "the University of Berlin, quartered opposite the King's palace, is, by the deed of our foundation, the intellectual bodyguard of the House of Hohenzollern (das geistige Leibregiment des Hauses Hohenzollern)."

In 1887, chancellor Otto Bismarck established the Seminar für Orientalische Sprachen (SOS), (usually known in English as the Oriental Seminary) to prepare public servants for posting to Kamerun (later Cameroon), then part of the German colonial empire. Various Asian languages were taught there, and in 1890, there were 115 students, which belonged to various faculties, including law; philosophy, medicine and physical sciences; and theology (as part of their training to be missionaries). Teachers included Hermann Nekes (1909–1915) and Heinrich Vieter. In the 1920s to 1930s, renowned Jewish orientalist Eugen Mittwoch was director of the school, before being forced to emigrate to London after Kristallnacht in 1938.

Friedrich Wilhelm University became an emulated model of a modern university in the 19th century.

=== Nazi regime ===
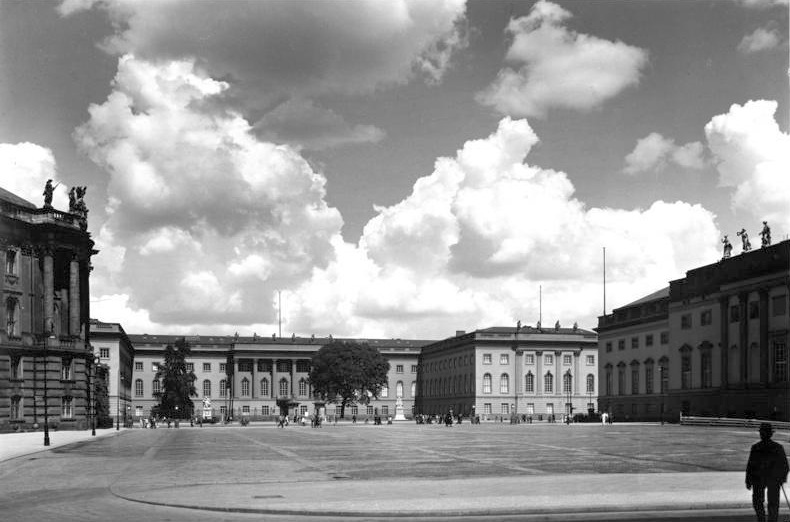
Friedrich Wilhelm University in 1938

After 1933, like all German universities, Friedrich Wilhelm University was impacted by the Nazi regime. The rector during this period was Eugen Fischer. The Law for the Restoration of the Professional Civil Service (German "Gesetz zur Wiederherstellung des Berufsbeamtentums") resulted in 250 Jewish professors and employees being fired from the university during 1933–1934, as well as numerous doctorates being withdrawn. Students and scholars, and other political opponents of Nazis, were ejected from the university and often deported. During this time, nearly a third of all the staff were fired by the Nazis.

It was from the university's library that some 20,000 books by "degenerates" and opponents of the regime were taken to be burned on 10 May of that year in the Opernplatz square (now called the Bebelplatz) for a demonstration that was protected by the SA and featured a speech by Reich Minister of Propaganda Joseph Goebbels. A monument to this tragic event called The Empty Library can now be found in the center of the square. It consists of a glass panel embedded in the pavement that looks into a large, subterranean white room with empty shelf space for 20,000 volumes, along with a plaque bearing an epigraph taken from an 1820 work by the great German-Jewish writer Heinrich Heine:

"Das war ein Vorspiel nur,
dort wo man Bücher verbrennt,
verbrennt man am Ende auch Menschen."
("This was but a prelude;
where they burn books,
they ultimately burn people").

=== Cold War ===
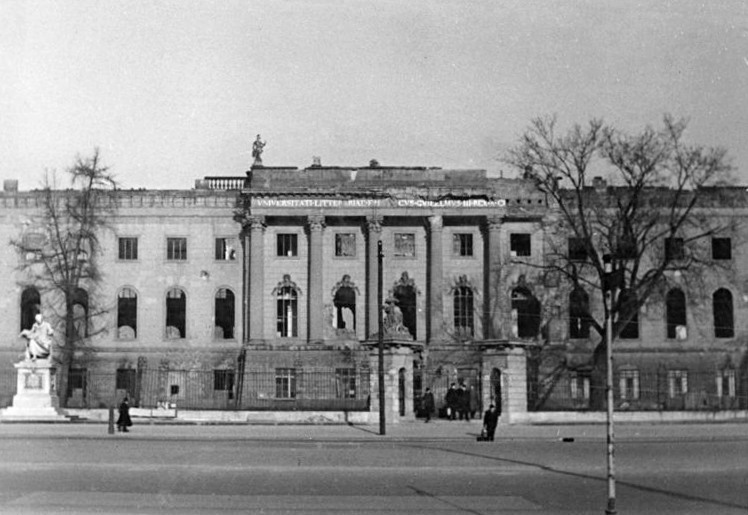
Humboldt University, 1950

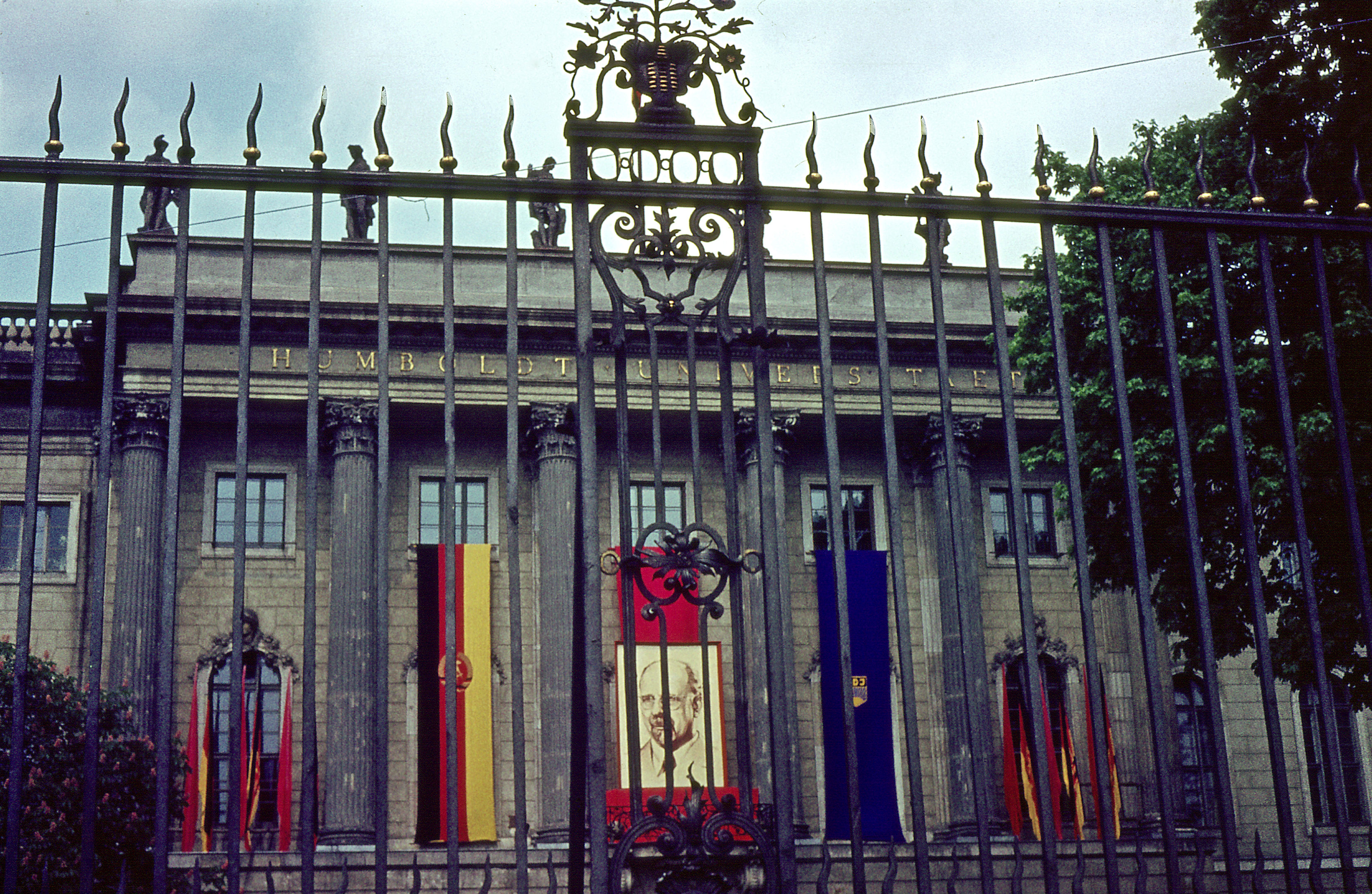
Humboldt University in 1964

During the Cold War, the university was located in East Berlin. It reopened in 1946 as the University of Berlin, but faced repression from the Soviet Military Administration in Germany, including the persecution of liberal and social democrat students. Almost immediately, the Soviet occupiers started persecuting non-communists and suppressing academic freedom at the university, requiring lectures to be submitted for approval by Socialist Unity Party officials, and piped Soviet propaganda into the cafeteria. This led to strong protests within the student body and faculty. NKVD secret police arrested a number of students in March 1947 as a response. The Soviet Military Tribunal in Berlin-Lichtenberg ruled the students were involved in the formation of a "resistance movement at the University of Berlin", as well as espionage, and were sentenced to 25 years of forced labor.

From 1945 to 1948, 18 other students and teachers were arrested or abducted, many missing for weeks, and some were taken to the Soviet Union and executed. Many of the students targeted by Soviet persecution were active in the liberal or social democratic resistance against the Soviet-imposed communist dictatorship. The German communist party had long regarded the social democrats as their main enemies, dating back to the early days of the Weimar Republic. During the Berlin Blockade, the Free University of Berlin was established as a de facto western successor in West Berlin in 1948, with support from the United States, and retaining traditions and faculty members of the old Friedrich Wilhelm University. The name of the Free University refers to West Berlin's perceived status as part of the Western "free world", in contrast to the "unfree" Communist world in general and the "unfree" communist-controlled university in East Berlin in particular.

Because the historical name, the Royal Friedrich Wilhelm University of Berlin, had monarchic origins, the school was officially renamed in 1949. Although the Soviet occupational authorities preferred to name the school after a communist leader, university leaders were able to name it the "Humboldt-Universität zu Berlin", after the two Humboldt brothers, a name that was also uncontroversial in the West and capitalized on the fame of the Humboldt name, which is associated with the Humboldtian model of higher education.

=== Modern Germany ===
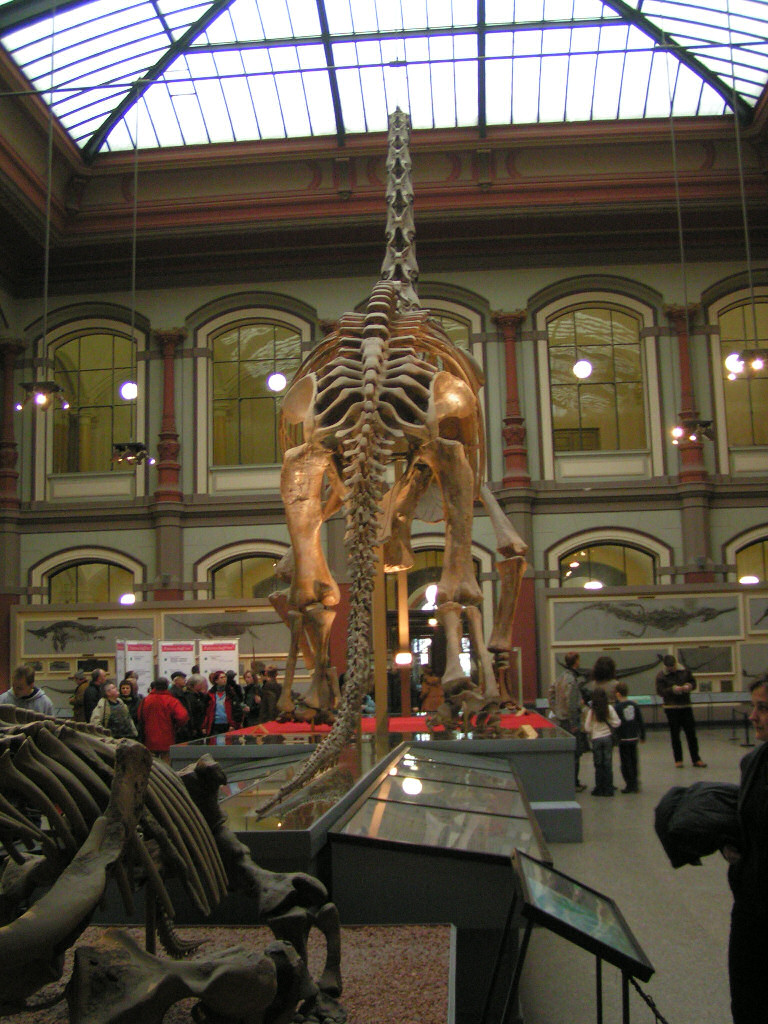
The Berlin Natural History Museum (shown here photographed in 2005) is one of the largest natural history museums in the world. Founded alongside the University of Berlin in 1810 it left the Humboldt University in 2009.

After the German reunification, the university was radically restructured under the Structure and Appointment Commissions, which were presided over by West German professors. For departments on social sciences and humanities, the faculty was subjected to a "liquidation" process, in which contracts of employees were terminated and positions were made open to new academics, mainly West Germans. Older professors were offered early retirement. The East German higher education system included a much larger number of permanent assistant professors, lecturers and other middle level academic positions. After reunification, these positions were abolished or converted to temporary posts for consistency with the West German system. As a result, only 10% of the mid-level academics in Humboldt-Universität still had a position in 1998. Through the transformations, the university's research and exchange links with Eastern European institutions were maintained and stabilized.

Today, Humboldt University is a state university with a large number of students (36,986 in 2014, among them more than 4,662 foreign students) after the model of West German universities, and like its counterpart the Free University of Berlin.

The university consists of three different campuses, namely Campus Mitte, Campus Nord and Campus Adlershof. Its main building is located in the centre of Berlin at the boulevard Unter den Linden and is the heart of Campus Mitte. The building was erected on order by King Frederick II for his younger brother Prince Henry of Prussia. All the institutes of humanities are located around the main building together with the Department of Law and the Department of Business and Economics. Campus Nord is located north of the main building close to Berlin Hauptbahnhof and is the home of the life science departments including the university medical center Charité. The natural sciences, together with computer science and mathematics, are located at Campus Adlershof in the south-east of Berlin. Furthermore, the university continues its tradition of a book sale at the university gates facing Bebelplatz.

The main building of Humboldt- Universität, located in Berlin's "Mitte" district (Unter den Linden boulevard)

== Organization ==
=== Faculties and departments ===
The university is divided into 9 faculties:

Academic Units of Humboldt University of Berlin
Faculty	Departments
Faculty of Arts and Humanities	Department of Philosophy; Department of History; Department of European Ethnology; Department of Library and Information Science
Faculty of Economics and Business Administration	
Faculty of Humanities and Social Sciences	Department of Archaeology; Department of Art and Visual History; Department of Asian and African Studies; Department of Cultural History and Theory; Department of Education Studies; Department of Musicology and Media Studies; Department of Rehabilitation Sciences; Department of Social Sciences; Department of Sports Sciences; Centre for Transdisciplinary Gender Studies
Faculty of Law	
Faculty of Language, Literature and Humanities	Department of German Literature; Department of German Studies and Linguistics; Department of Northern European Studies; Department of Romance Literatures and Linguistics; Department of English and American Studies; Department of Slavic and Hungarian Studies; Department of Classical Philology
Faculty of Life Sciences	Albrecht Daniel Thaer-Institute of Agricultural and Horticultural Sciences; Department of Biology; Department of Psychology
Faculty of Mathematics and Natural Sciences	Department of Chemistry; Department of Computer Science; Department of Geography; Department of Mathematics; Department of Physics
Faculty of Theology	
Charité - Universitätsmedizin Berlin	

=== Graduate schools ===
Graduate schools provide structured PhD programmes:

- Berlin Graduate School of Ancient Studies
- Berlin Graduate School of Social Sciences
- Berlin-Brandenburg School for Regenerative Therapies
- Berlin School of Mind and Brain
- Berlin Mathematical School
- Graduate School of Ancient Philosophy
- Humboldt Graduate School
- SALSA - School of Analytical Sciences Adlershof
- Graduate School "Advanced Materials"

=== Central institutes ===
Furthermore, there are four central institutes (Zentralinstitute) that are part of the university:

- Centre for British Studies (in German: Großbritannienzentrum)
- Humboldt-Innovation (research transfer and spin-off service)
- Museum für Naturkunde (Natural History Museum)
- Späth-Arboretum

=== Student parliament ===
Each year, students elect the student parliament (Studierendenparlament), which serves as the body of student representatives under German law (AStA).

Summary of Studierendenparlament election results (seats)
List	2022	2023	2024	2025
Linke Liste an der HU	8	14	19	26
Grünboldt	6	5	8	11
Juso-Hochschulgruppe	13	7	6	6
OLKS – Offene Liste Kritischer Studierender	9	6	6	7
International Youth and Students for Social Equality	3	2	5	3
Queer-feministische LGBT*I*Q*-Liste	6	-	5	4
Liberale Hochschulgruppe	-	3	4	-
RCDS – Association of Christian Democratic Students	8	2	3	3
Die Pendler:innen – Wir fahren ein!	-	-	2	-
ZfgU – Zeit für gute Uni	-	2	1	-
ewig und 3 Tage – Langzeitprojekte	-	1	1	-
V.O.D.K.A.	-	10	-	-
Die Linke.SDS HU Berlin	4	4	-	-
Studis für Adlershof	-	2	-	-
João & the autonom alkis. DIE LISTE	3	2	-	-
Sum	60	60	60	60

== Library ==
When the Royal Library proved insufficient, a new library was founded in 1831, first located in several temporary sites. In 1871–1874 a library building was constructed, following the design of architect Paul Emanuel Spieker. In 1910 the collection was relocated to the building of the Berlin State Library.

During the Weimar Period the library contained 831,934 volumes (1930) and was thus one of the leading university libraries in Germany at that time.

During the Nazi book burnings in 1933, no volumes from the university library were destroyed. The loss through World War II was comparatively small. In 2003, natural science-related books were outhoused to the newly founded library at the Adlershof campus, which is dedicated solely to the natural sciences.

Since the premises of the State Library had to be cleared in 2005, a new library building was erected close to the main building in the center of Berlin. The "Jacob und Wilhelm Grimm-Zentrum" (Jacob and Wilhelm Grimm Centre, Grimm Zentrum, or GZ as referred to by students) opened in 2009.

In total, the university library contains about 6.5 million volumes and 9,000 held magazines and journals, and is one of the biggest university libraries in Germany.

The books of the Institut für Sexualwissenschaft were destroyed during the Nazi book burnings, and the institute destroyed. Under the terms of the Magnus Hirschfeld Foundation, the government had agreed to continue the work of the institute at the university after its founder's death. However, these terms were ignored. In 2001, the university acquired the Archive for Sexology from the Robert Koch Institute, which was founded with a large private library donated by Erwin J. Haeberle. This has now been housed at the new Magnus Hirschfeld Center.

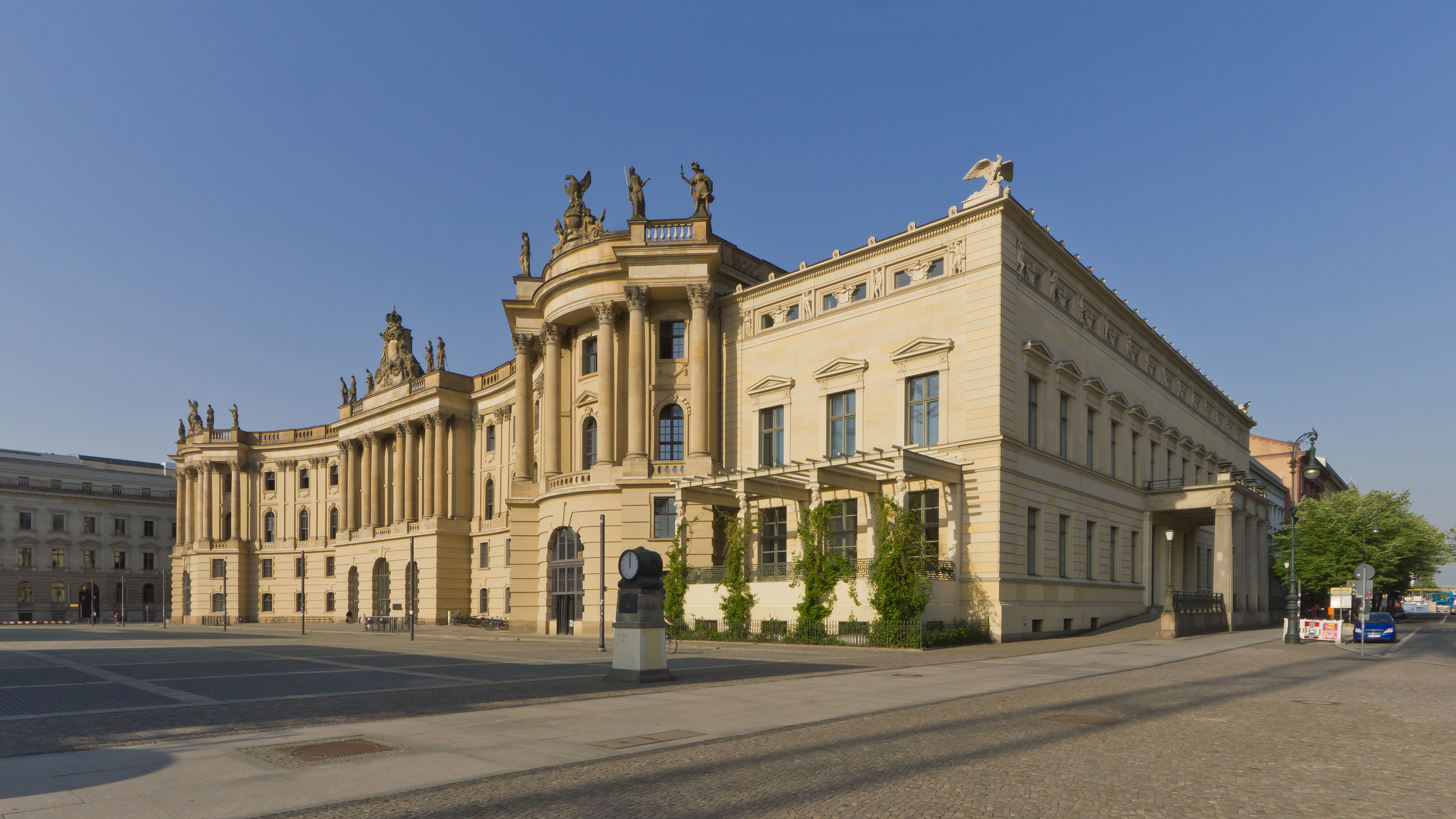
The former Royal Library, now seat of the Faculty of Law

== Academics ==
University rankings

Overall – Global & National
QS World 2026	130	7
THE World 2024	=87	4

=== Rankings ===
According to the 2024 QS World University Rankings, the university ranked 120th globally and 7th at the national level. Additionally, in the Times Higher Education World University Rankings for 2024, it was placed at 87th worldwide and 4th within the country. Because of an unresolved dispute over the counting of Nobel laureates before the Second World War – both Humboldt University and the Free University of Berlin claim to be the rightful successor of the Royal Friedrich Wilhelm University of Berlin – both do not appear in the Academic Ranking of World Universities (ARWU) anymore since 2008.

In the 2023 QS Subject Ranking, Humboldt University ranks first in Germany in the arts and humanities and the social sciences. In the 2024 THE Subject Ranking, Humboldt University ranks second in Germany in the arts and humanities, law, psychology, and social sciences. In the 2023 ARWU Subject Ranking, Humboldt University ranks first in Germany in geography.

QS World University Rankings by Subject 2026
Subject	Global	National
Arts & Humanities	▲24	1
Linguistics	▲46	1
Theology, Divinity and Religious Studies	▼39	▼4
Archaeology	101-150	▼8
Classics and Ancient History	▼32	▲2
English Language and Literature	▼55	▼3
History	▲31	▼2
Modern Languages	▲38	2
Philosophy	▼14	2
Engineering and Technology	N/A	N/A
Computer Science and Information Systems	▼149	▲6
Life Sciences & Medicine (Charité)	▲32	1
Agriculture and Forestry	101–150	▲6-8
Biological Sciences	▲101	▼8
Biological Sciences (Charité)	71	▼4
Dentistry (Charité)	22	▼1
Medicine (Charité)	18	▼1
Psychology	▲53	1
Natural Sciences	82	▲5
Chemistry	▼151	▼11
Environmental Sciences	▼102	▼4
Geography	▲18	1
Mathematics	▲99	4
Physics and Astronomy	▲98	▼7
Social Sciences & Management	78	1
Accounting and Finance	▼151–200	▼6
Anthropology	▲46	▼2
Business and Management Studies	▼301–350	6–8
Communication and Media Studies	▼101–150	▼5–7
Economics and Econometrics	▼99	4
Education and Training	101-150	▼2-4
Law and Legal Studies	▲37	1
Library and Information Management	▲21	1
Politics	▼72	3
Sociology	▼25	▼1
Sports–Related Subjects	N/A	N/A
Statistics and Operational Research	51–100	2–6

THE World University Rankings by Subject 2024
Subject	Global	National
Arts & humanities	▲19	2
Computer science	251–300	▼18–23
Education	▲66	4
Law	▲31	2
Life sciences	▼83	▼8
Physical sciences	▼ =74	▼6
Psychology	▲ =39	2
Social sciences	▲ =42	▲2

ARWU Global Ranking of Academic Subjects 2023
Subject	Global	National
Natural Sciences
Mathematics	▼51–75	2–3
Physics	151–200	▼10–11
Chemistry	▼201–300	▼13–21
Earth Sciences	201–300	▲15–20
Geography	▼76–100	1
Ecology	▼151–200	▼13–16
Atmospheric Science	▲51–75	2
Engineering
Electrical & Electronic Engineering	301–400	▼9–11
Biomedical Engineering	▼101–150	▲2–5
Computer Science & Engineering	401–500	▲11–16
Materials Science & Engineering	201–300	8–13
Nanoscience & Nanotechnology	▼301–400	▼13–23
Environmental Science & Engineering	▼151–200	▼4–6
Water Resources	101–150	4–7
Biotechnology	101–150	▲2–7
Remote Sensing	▲24	2
Life Sciences
Biological Sciences	47	2
Human Biological Sciences	36	2
Agricultural Sciences	151–200	▲5–8
Veterinary Sciences	▼201–300	7–10
Medical Sciences
Clinical Medicine	▲47	▲2
Public Health	▲44	▲2
Dentistry & Oral Sciences	▲38	▼2
Nursing	▼101–150	1–2
Medical Technology	▼47	▲7
Pharmacy & Pharmaceutical Sciences	▼45	▼4
Social Sciences
Economics	▼151–200	▼5–8
Statistics	101–150	▲2–6
Law	151–200	1–2
Political Sciences	▲101–150	▲5–8
Sociology	51–75	▼3
Education	301–400	▲6–18
Psychology	▲51–75	▲1–4
Management	401–500	▲14–21
Public Administration	151–200	7–11

Measured by the number of top managers in the German economy, Humboldt-Universität ranked 53rd in 2019. In 2020, the American U.S. News & World Report listed Humboldt-Universität as the 82nd best in the world, climbing eight positions, being among the 100 best in the world in 17 areas out of 29 ranked. By 2026, it continued its climb to become the 51st best in the world, averaged across all its study areas.

=== International partnerships ===
HU students can study abroad for a semester or a year at partner institutions such as the University of Oxford, Princeton University and Peking University.

== Notable alumni and faculty ==
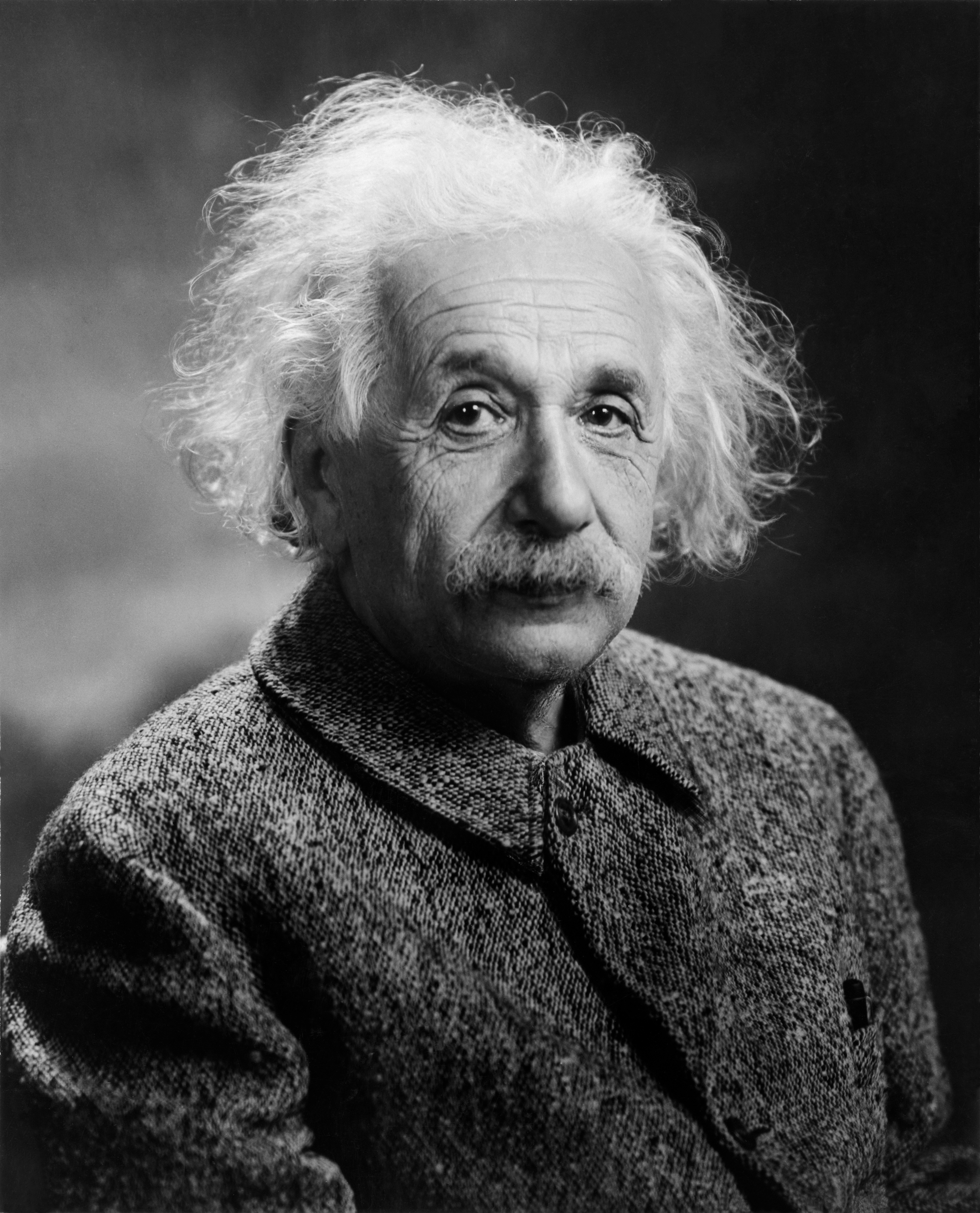
Albert Einstein, theoretical physicist known for developing the theory of relativity and recipient of the Nobel Prize in Physics

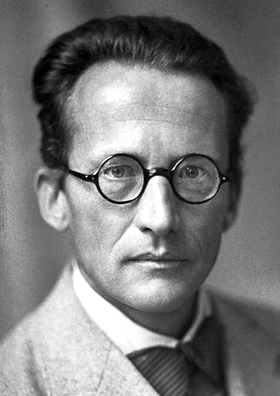
Erwin Schrödinger, physicist who developed a number of fundamental results in quantum theory, recipient of the Nobel Prize in Physics

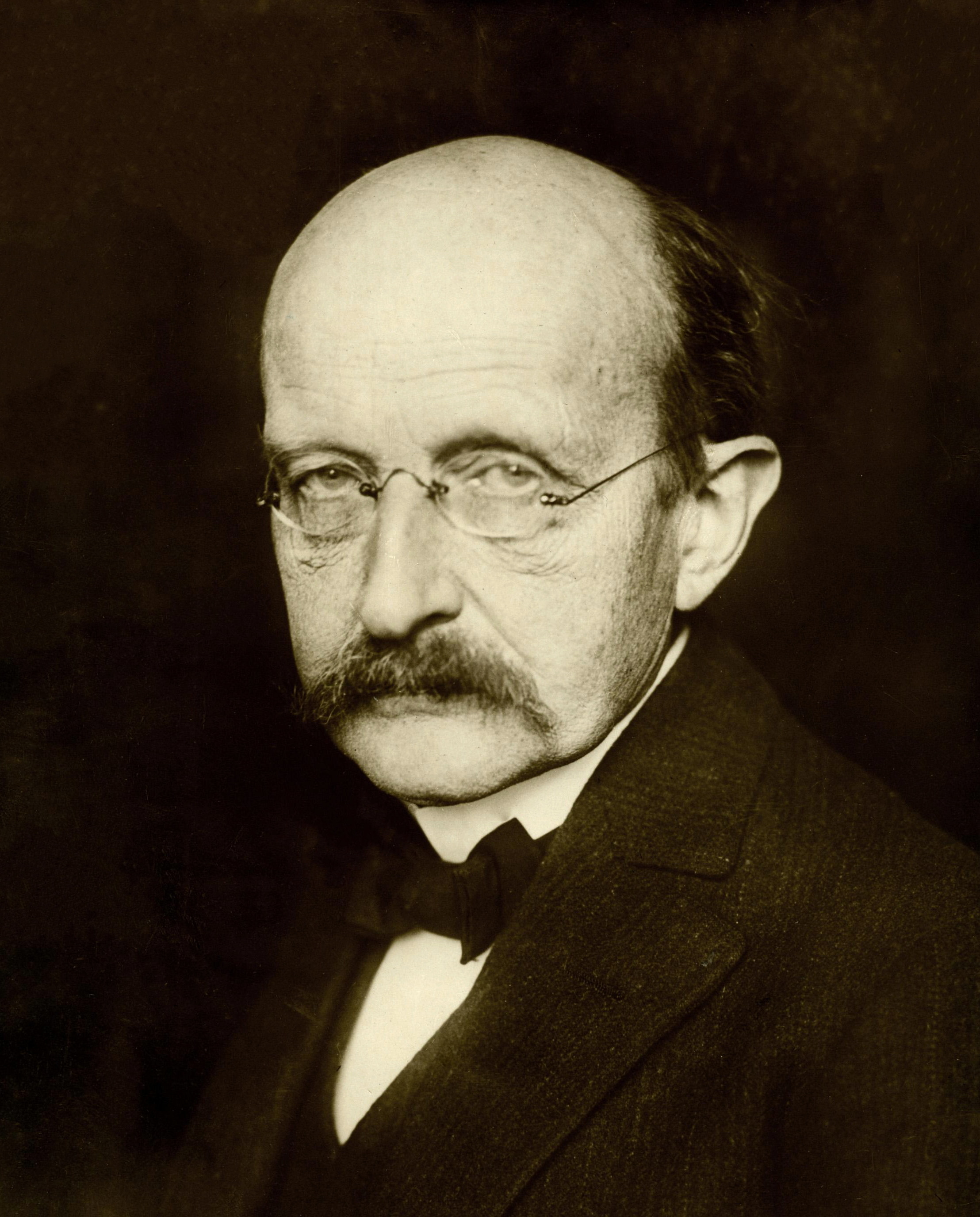
Max Planck, theoretical physicist and originator of quantum theory, recipient of the Nobel Prize in Physics

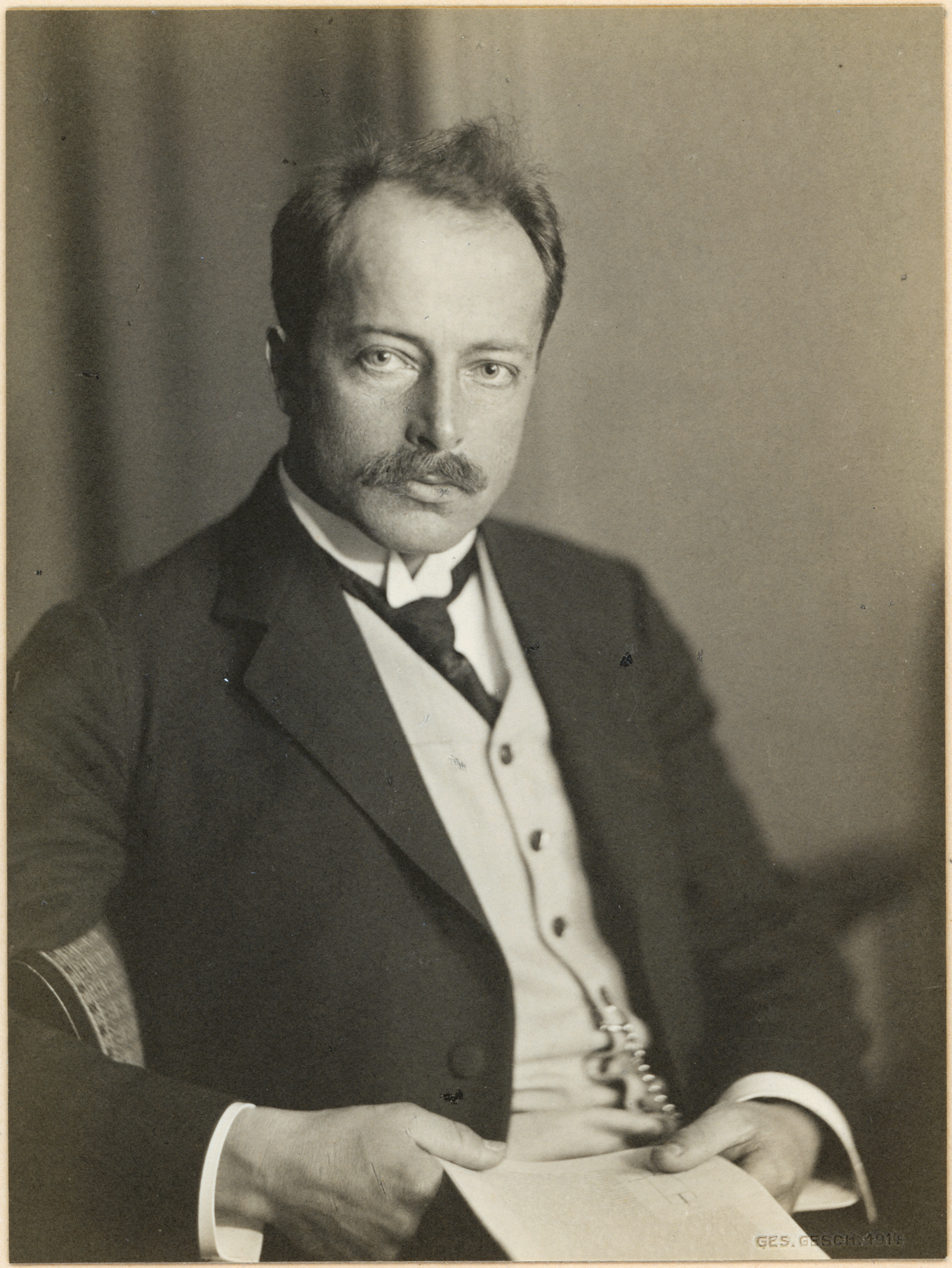
Max von Laue, physicist and recipient of the Nobel Prize in Physics

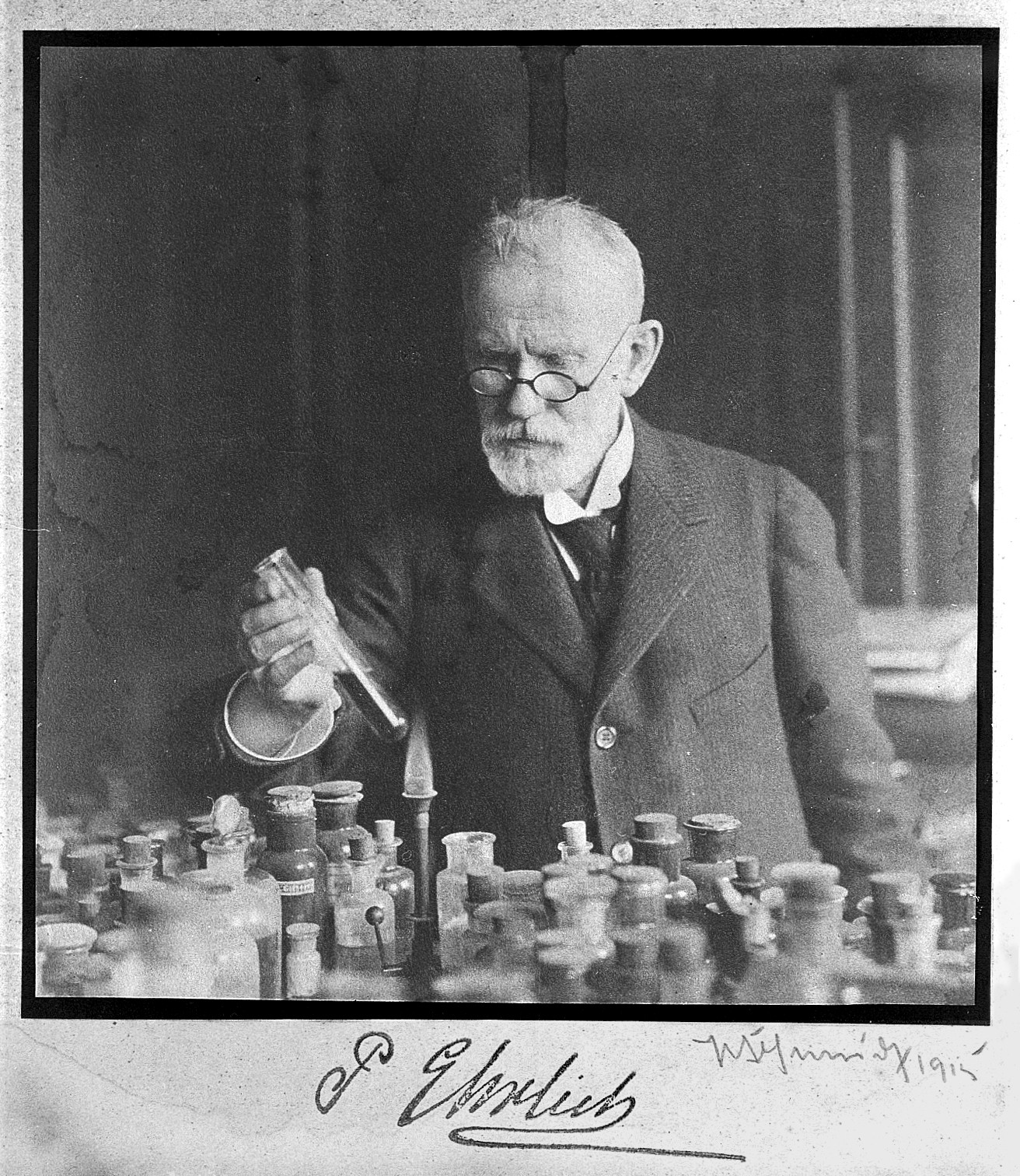
Paul Ehrlich, physician known for curing syphilis and recipient of the Nobel Prize in Physiology or Medicine

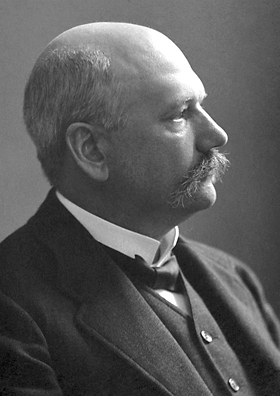
Albrecht Kossel, biochemist who pioneered in the study of genetics and recipient of the Nobel Prize for Physiology or Medicine

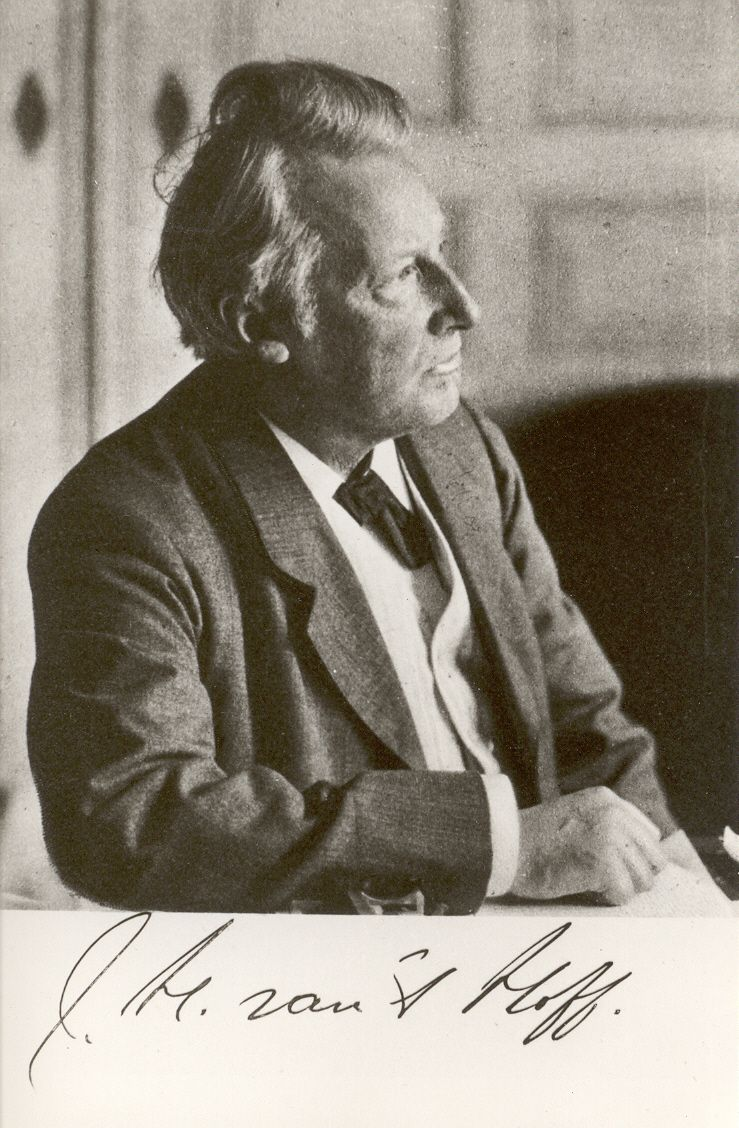
Jacobus Henricus van 't Hoff, pioneering chemist and the first winner of the Nobel Prize in Chemistry

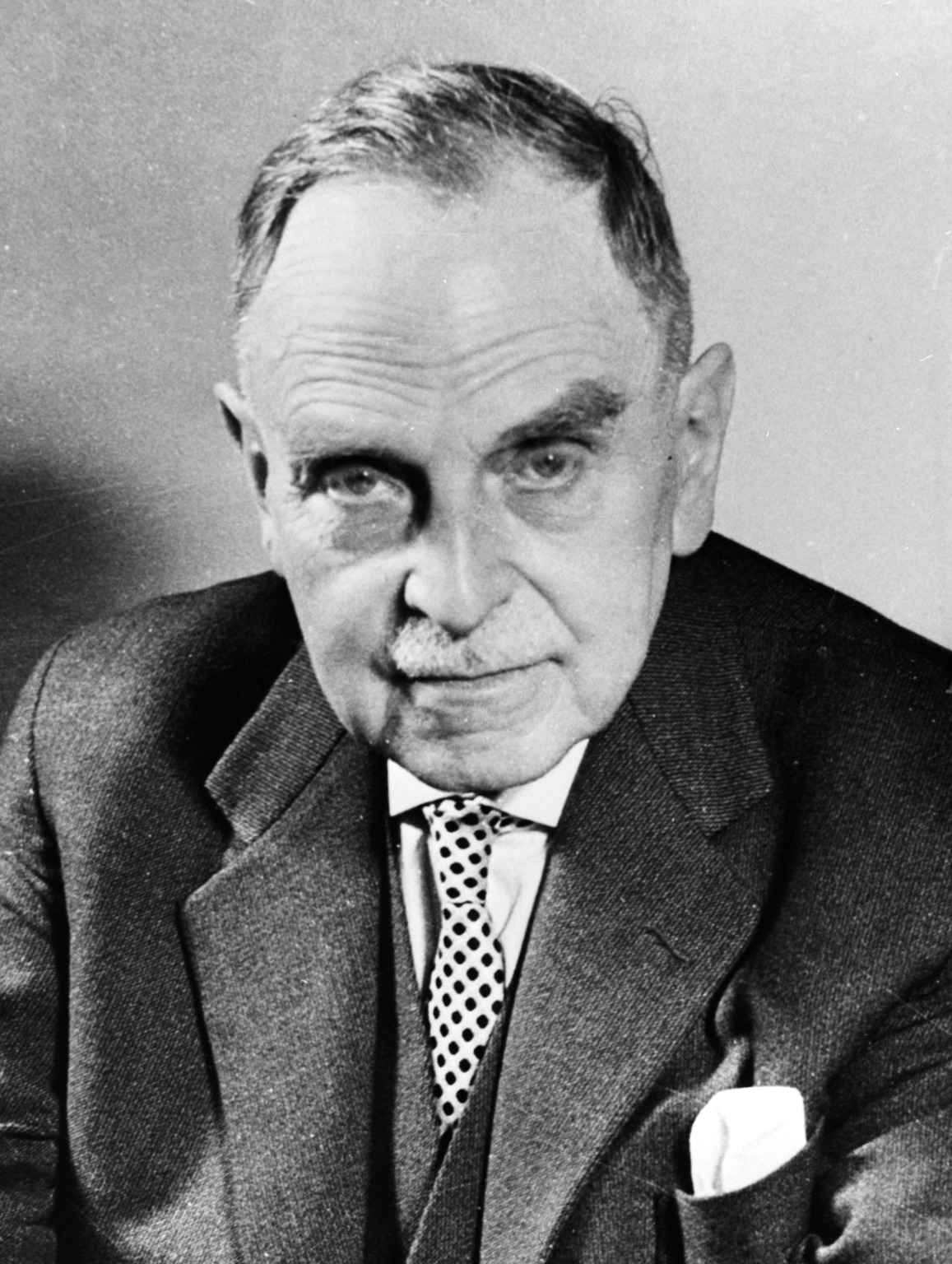
Otto Hahn, chemist, pioneer in the fields of radioactivity and radiochemistry, and recipient of the Nobel Prize for Chemistry

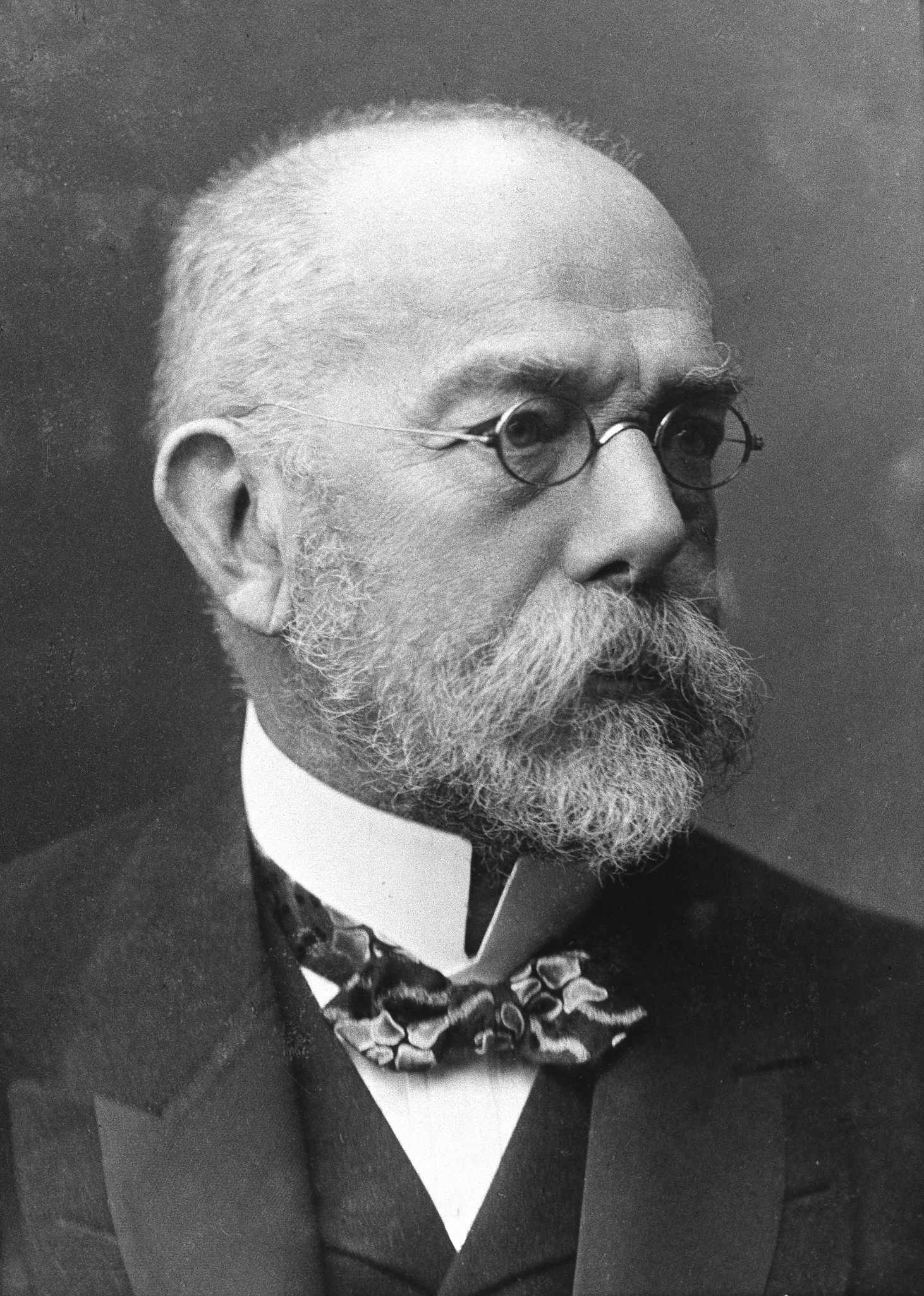
Robert Koch, physician and microbiologist, discoverer of anthrax, tuberculosis and cholera bacillus

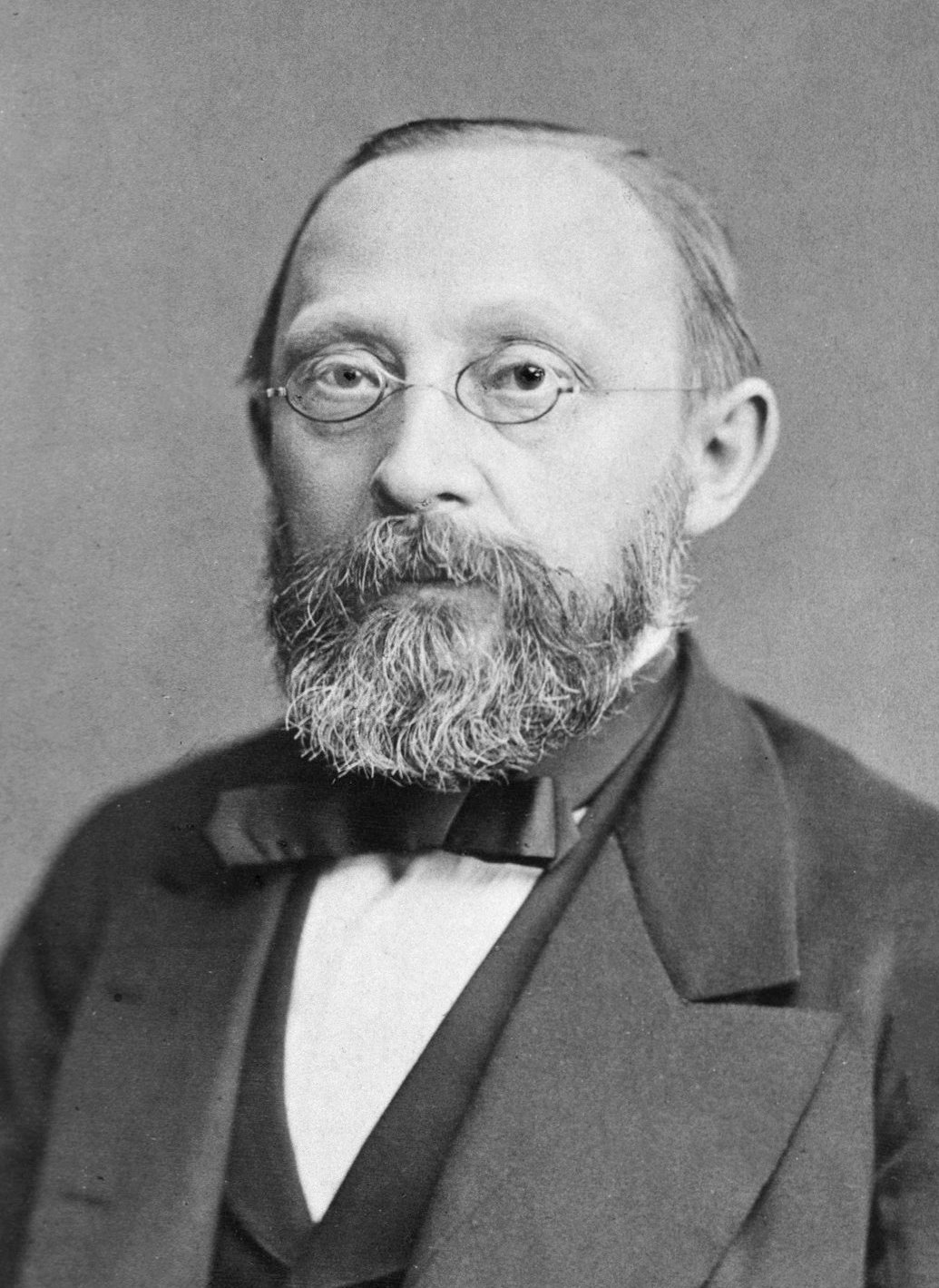
Rudolf Virchow, physician anthropologist, pathologist, prehistorian, biologist, father of modern pathology

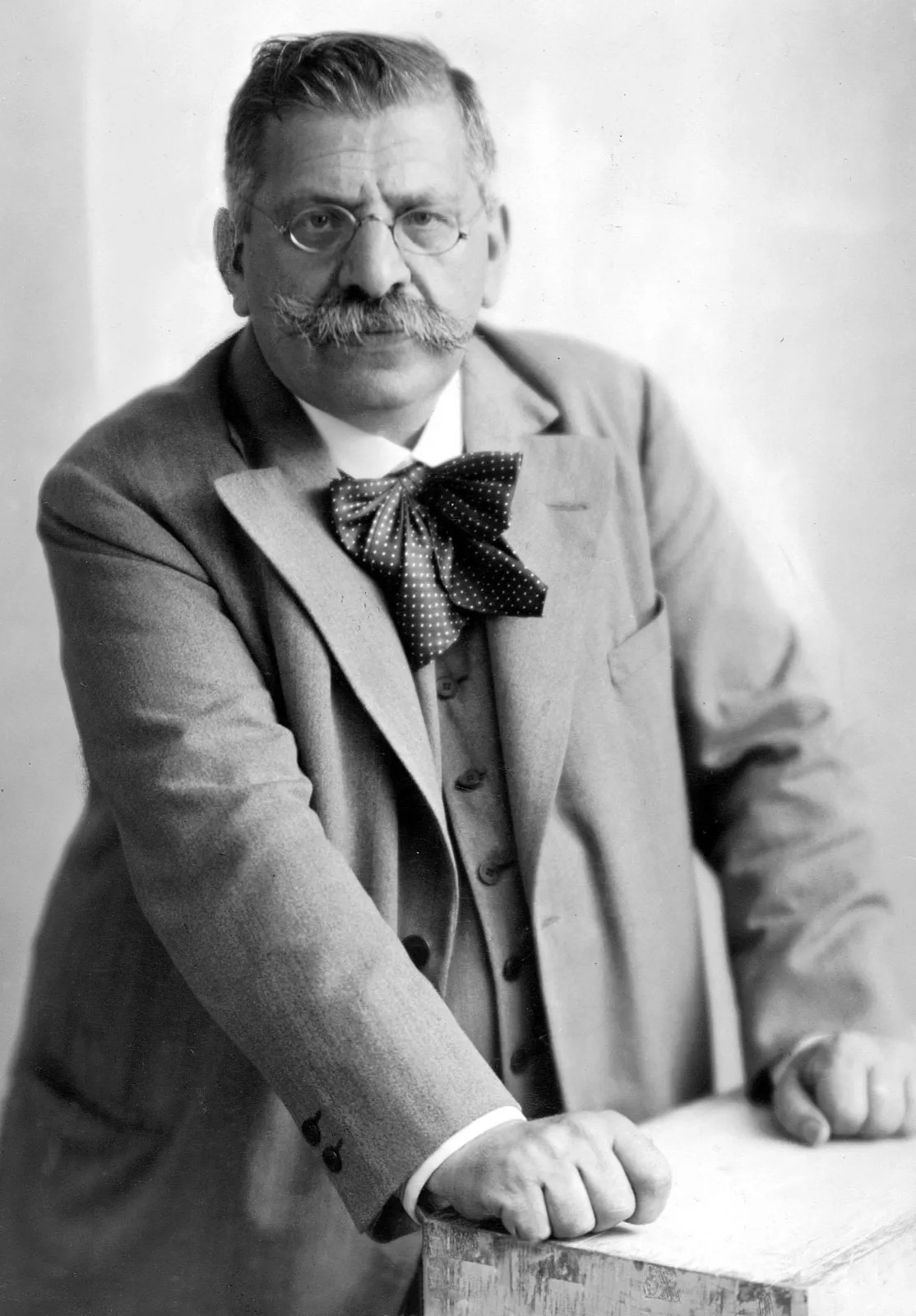
Magnus Hirschfeld, German physician, LGBTQ advocate, and sexologist, a student of notable Humboldt-Universität professor, Rudolf Virchow.

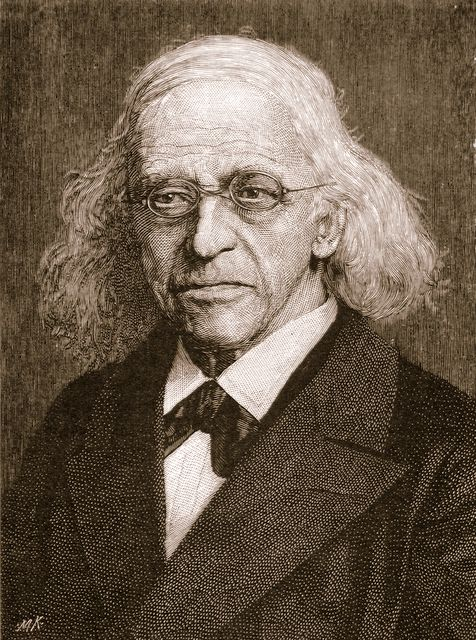
Theodor Mommsen, classical scholar and recipient of the Nobel Prize in Literature

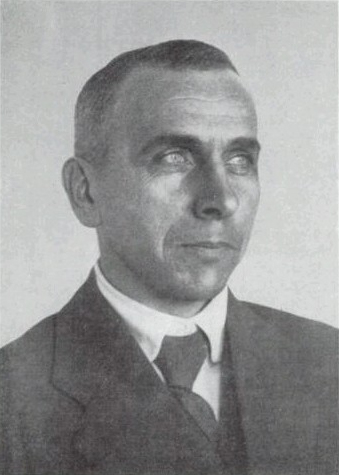
Alfred Wegener, polar researcher and geophysicist who originated the continental drift hypothesis

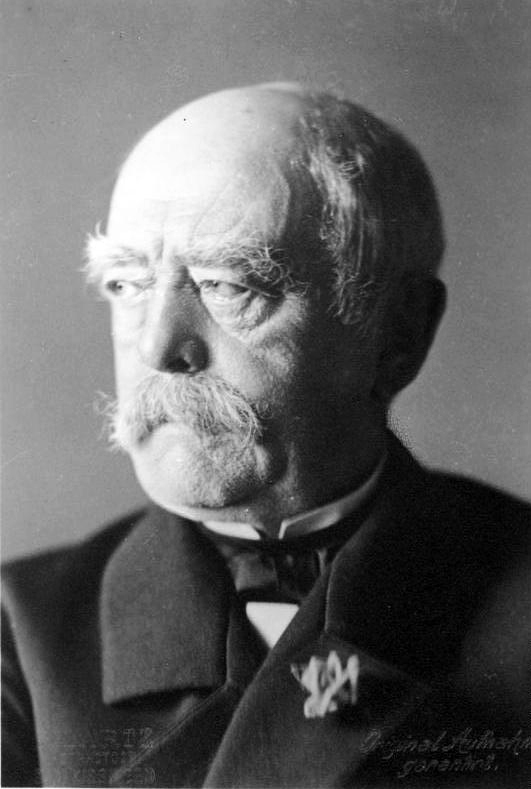
Otto von Bismarck, 1st Chancellor of Germany

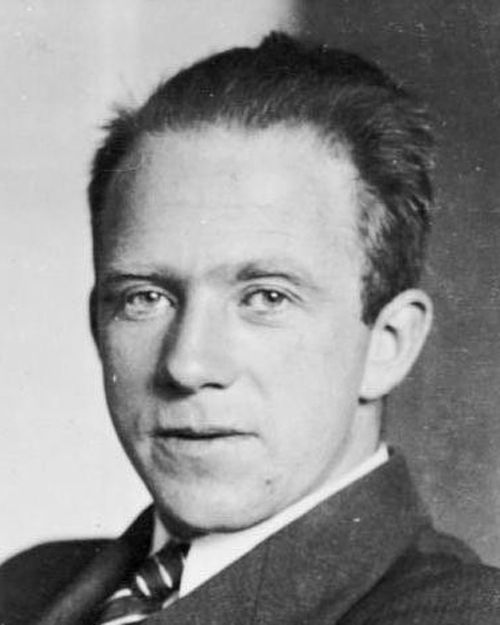
Werner Heisenberg, theoretical physicist and pioneer of quantum mechanics

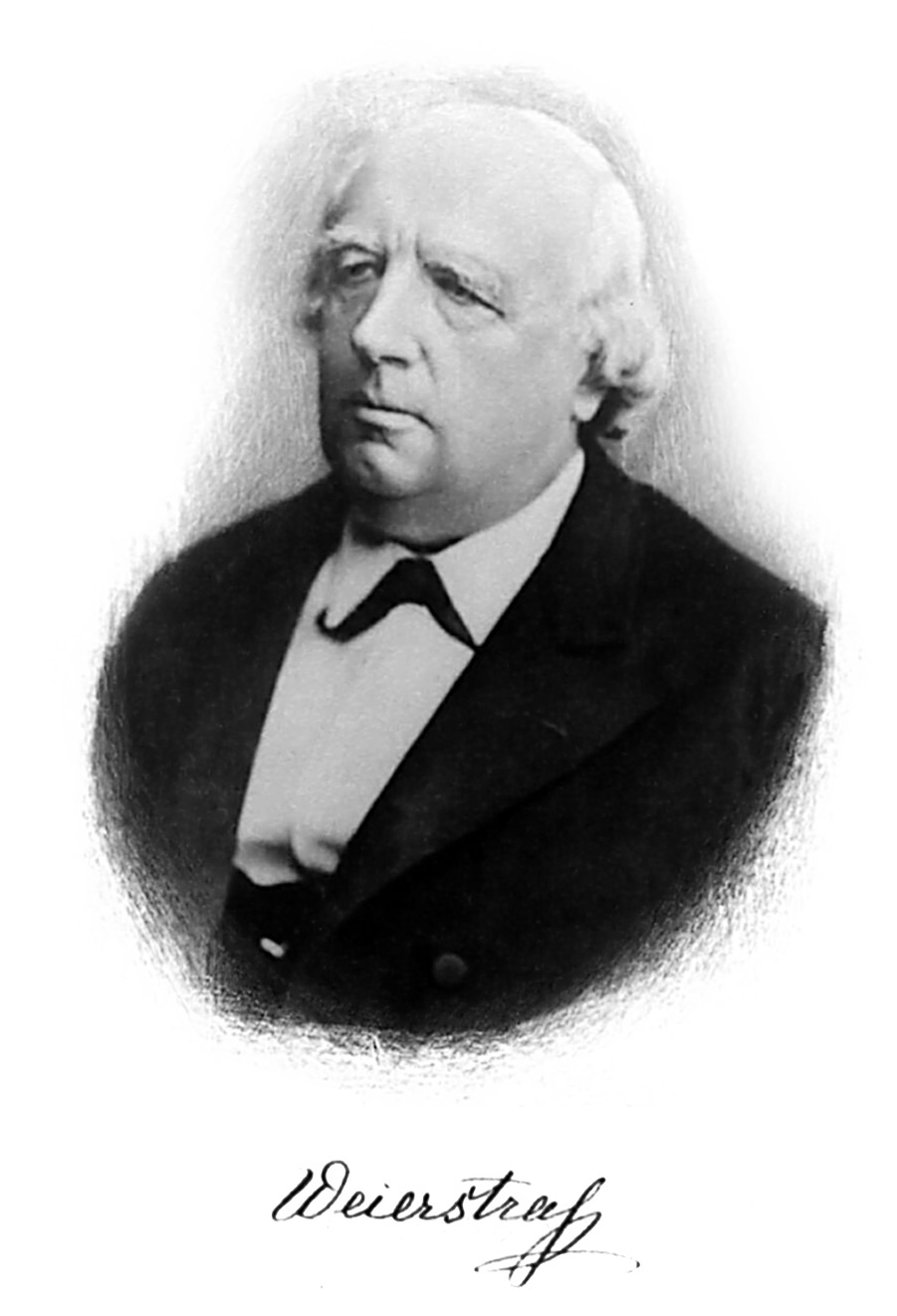
Karl Weierstrass, mathematician, considered "the father of modern analysis"

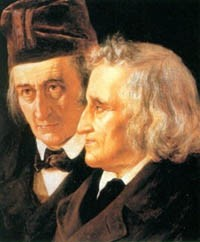
Jakob and Wilhelm Grimm, best-known collectors of German and European folk tales

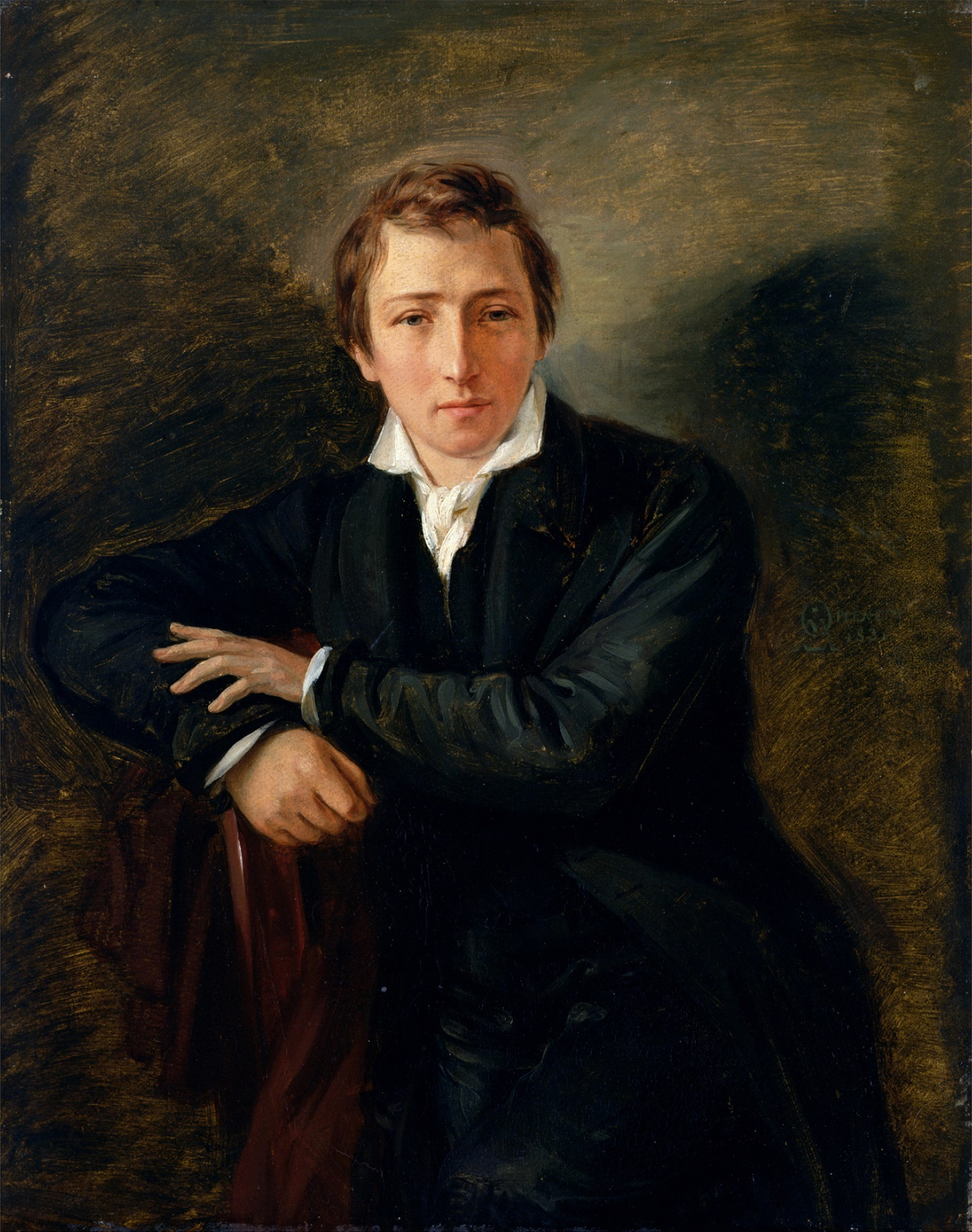
Heinrich Heine, poet best known for his early lyric poetry

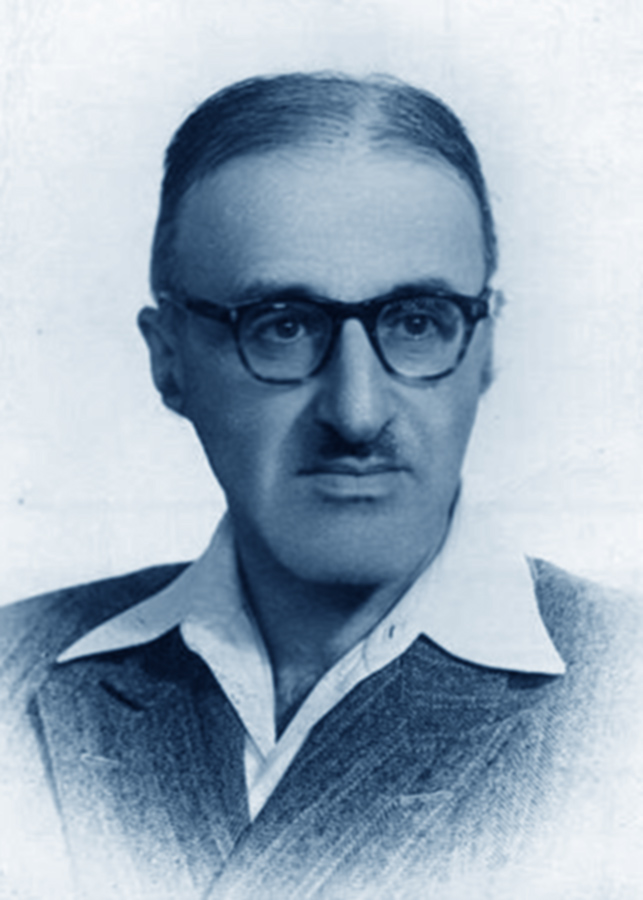
Yeshayahu Leibowitz, public intellectual, scientist, and writer

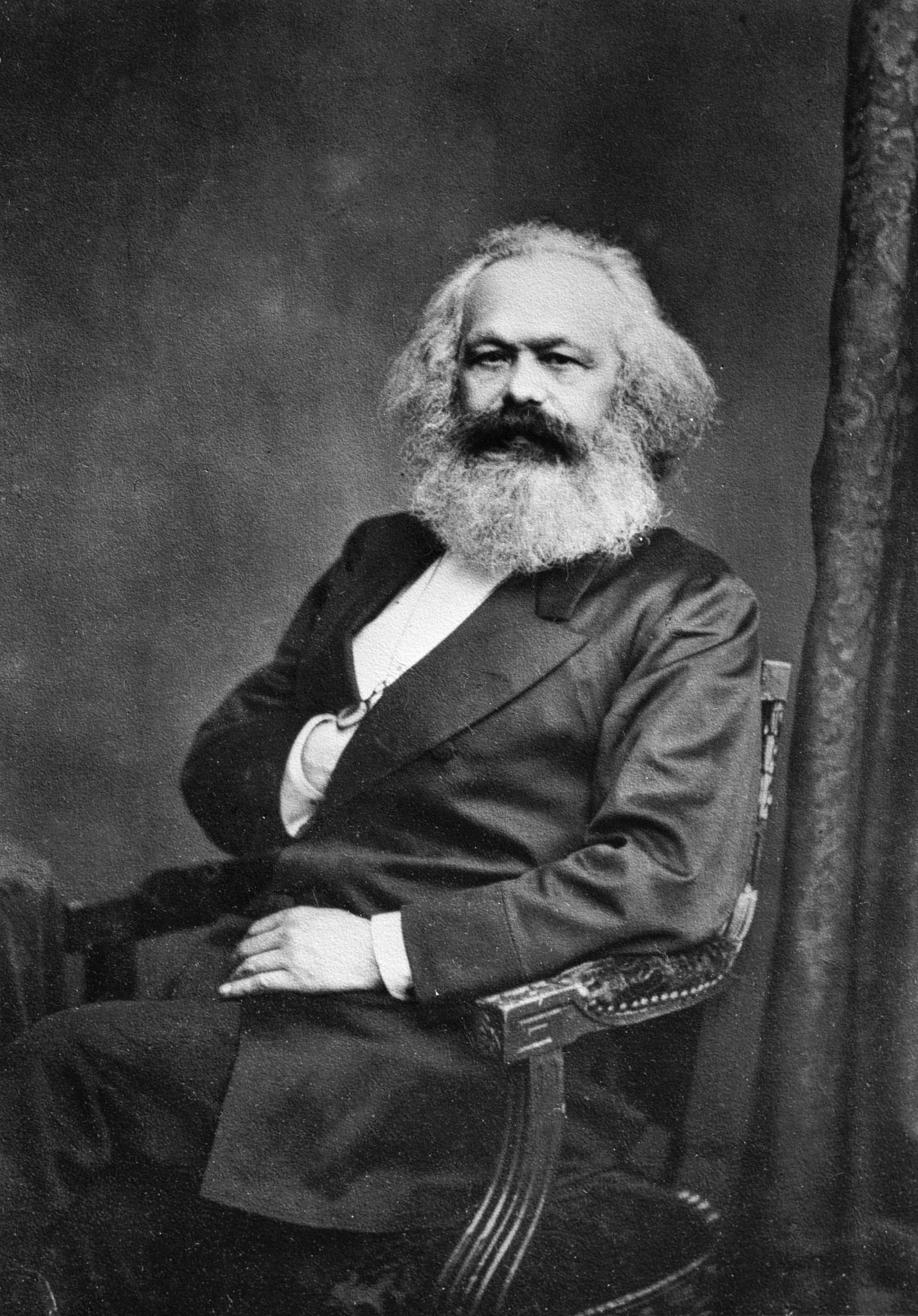
Karl Marx, philosopher, political theorist, and socialist revolutionary

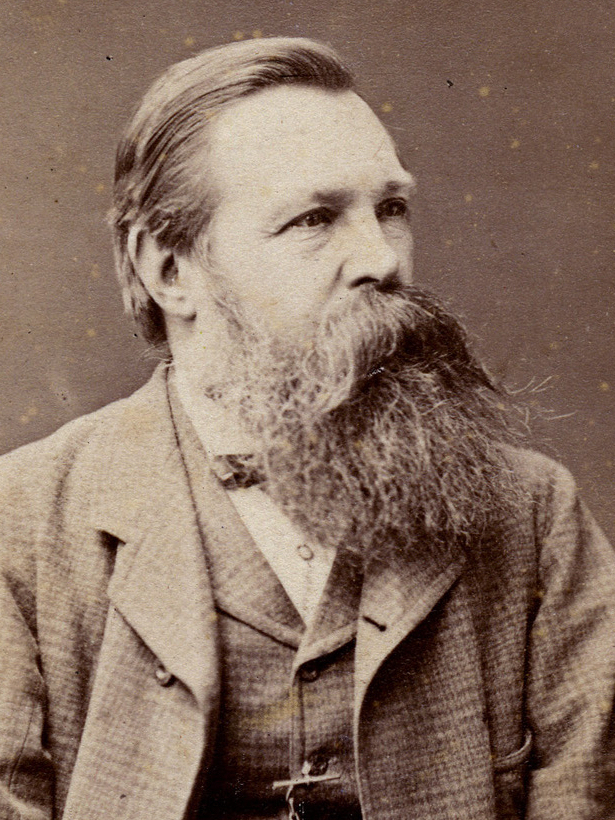
Friedrich Engels, philosopher and revolutionary socialist

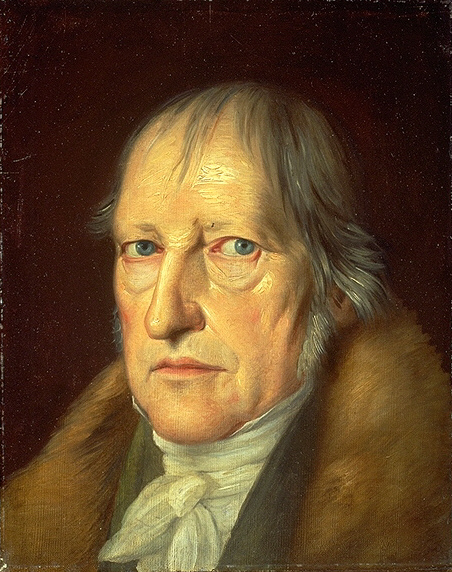
Georg Wilhelm Friedrich Hegel, idealist philosopher and one of the fundamental figures of modern Western philosophy

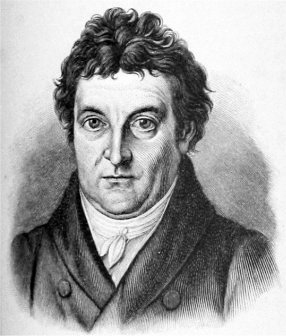
Johann Gottlieb Fichte, philosopher, German idealist

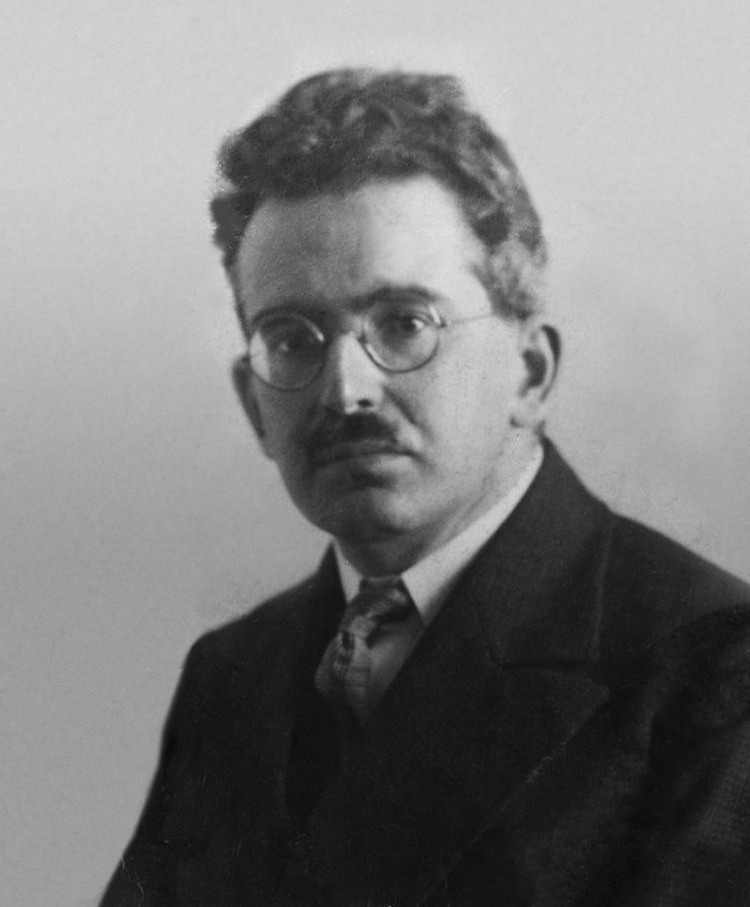
Walter Benjamin, philosopher, cultural critic and essayist

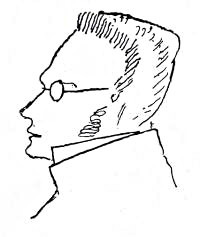
Max Stirner, philosopher and forerunner of nihilism and postmodernism

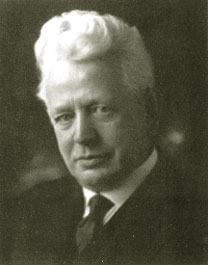
Ernst Cassirer, idealist philosopher

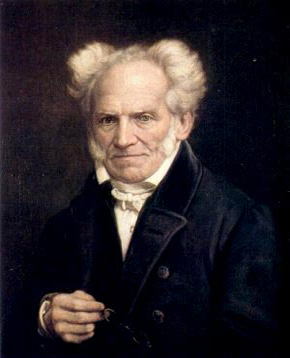
Arthur Schopenhauer, philosopher

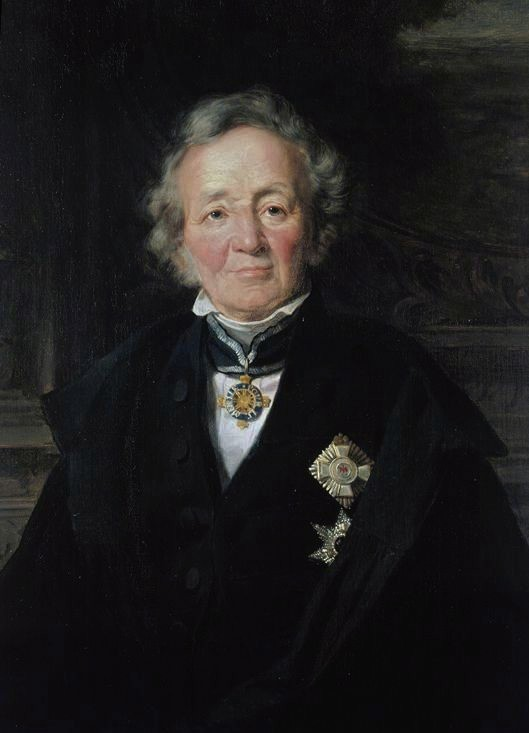
Leopold von Ranke, historian, founder of modern source-based history

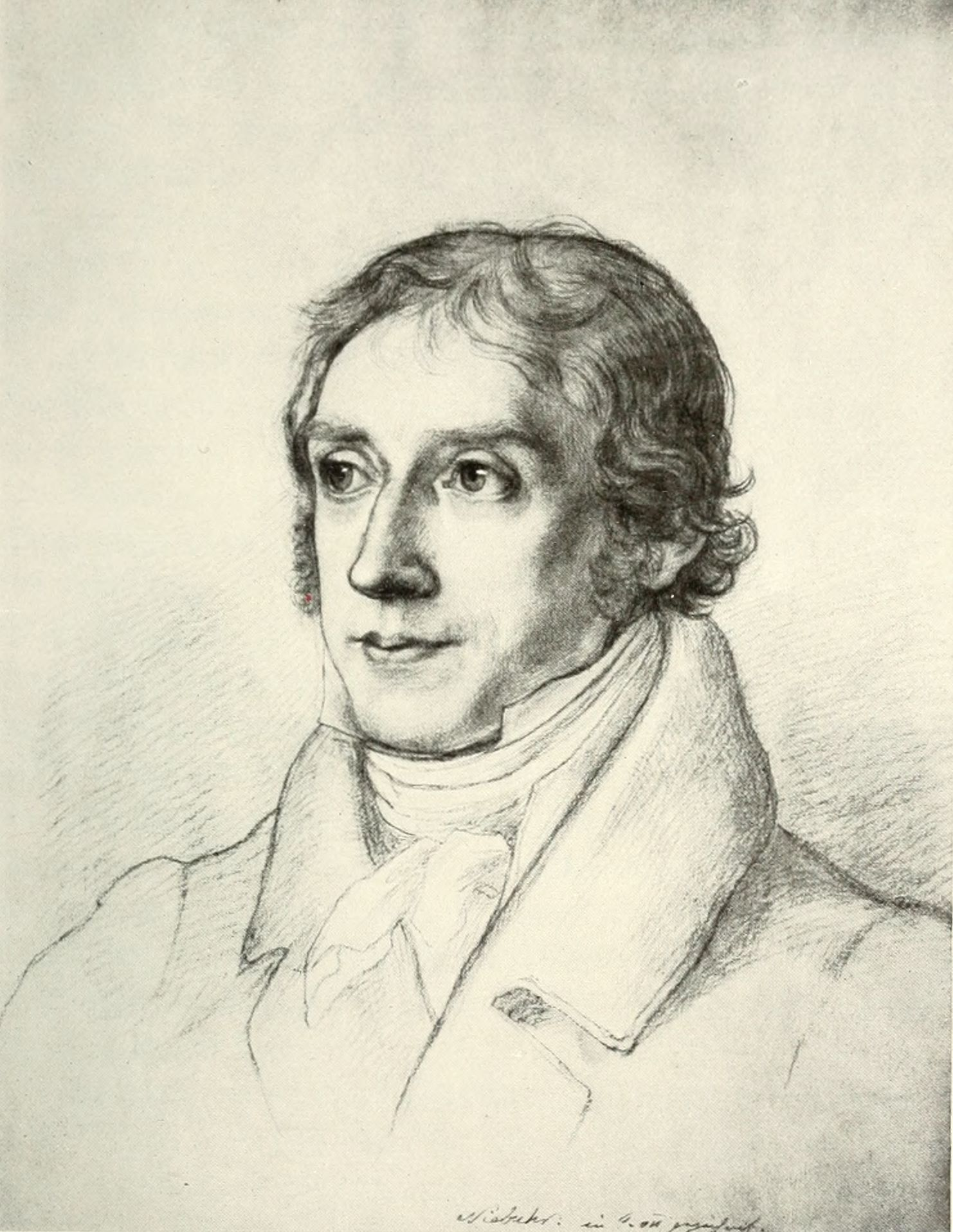
Barthold Georg Niebuhr, historian, statesman, banker, father of modern scholarly historiography

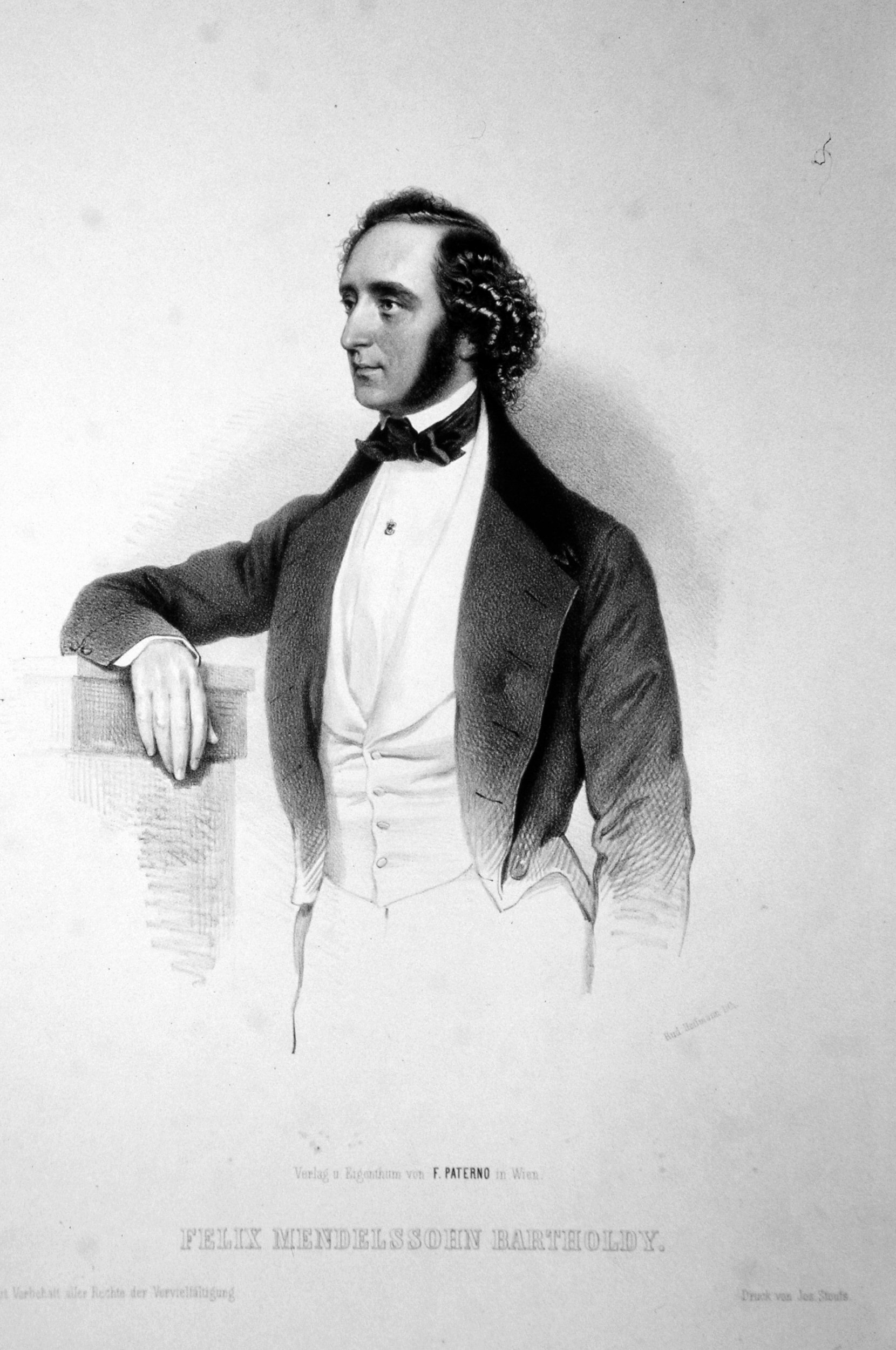
Felix Mendelssohn, composer during the early Romantic period

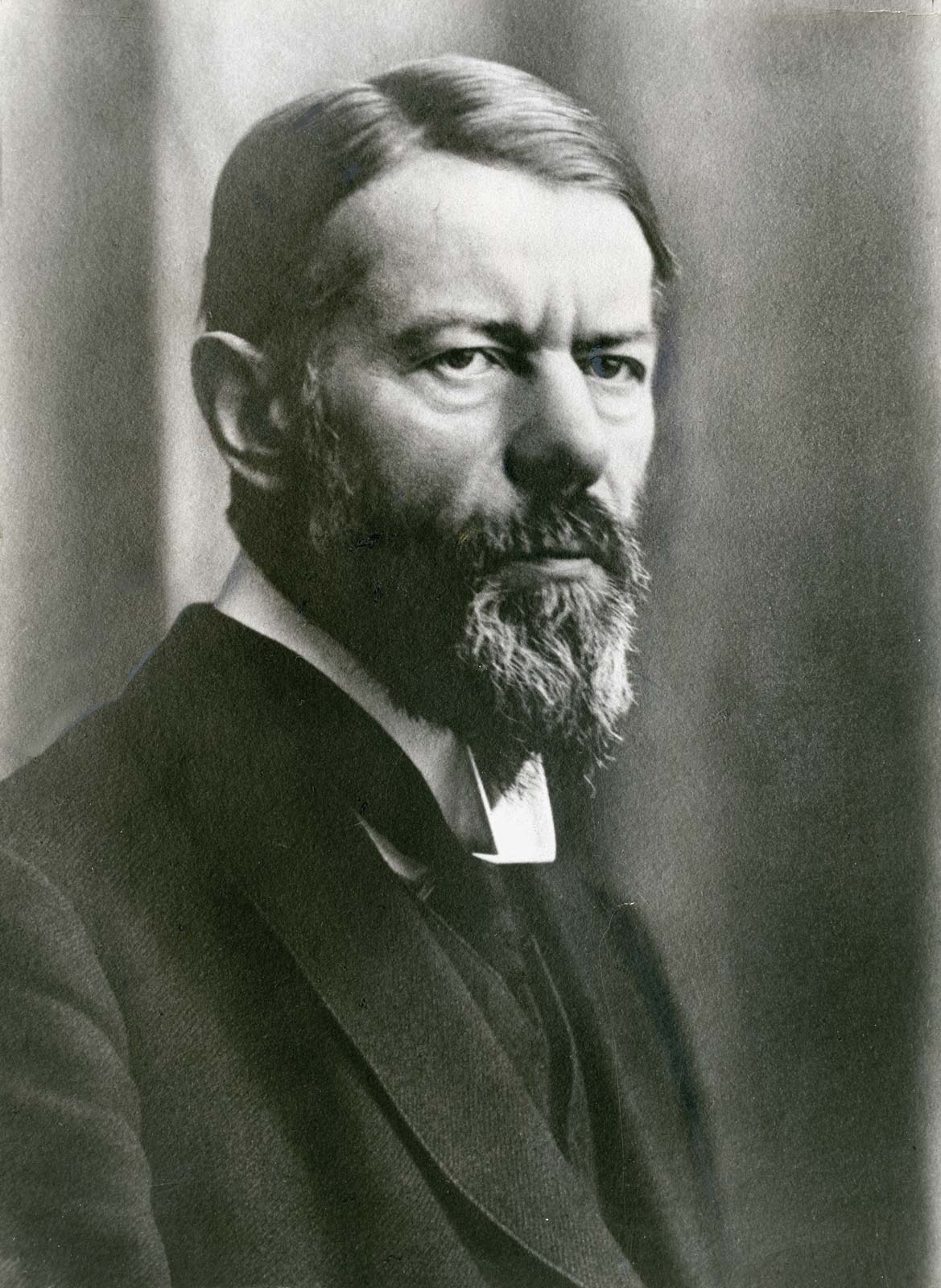
Max Weber, sociologist and influential figure in modern social theory and social research

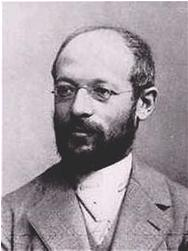
Georg Simmel, sociologist and philosopher

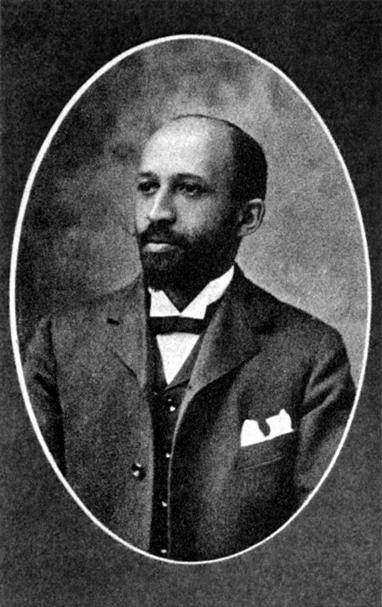
W.E.B. Du Bois, civil rights activist and academic

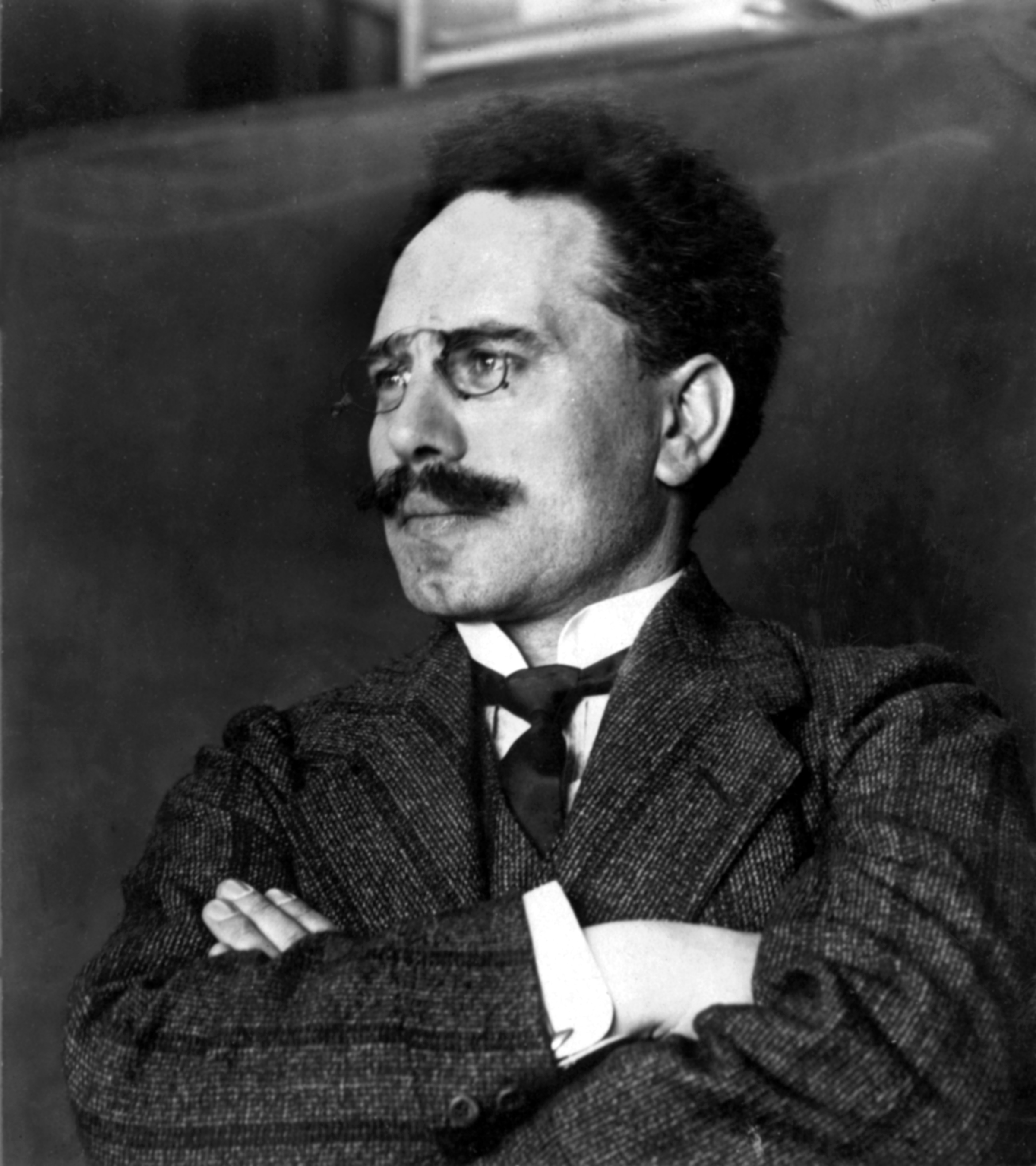
Karl Liebknecht, socialist politician and revolutionary

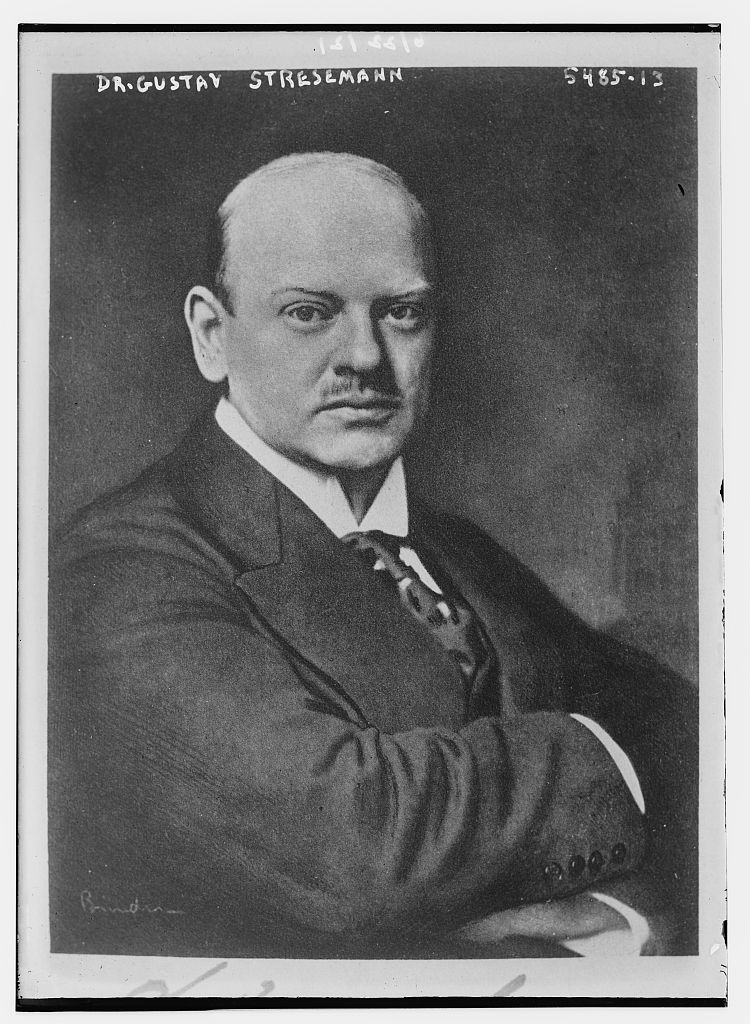
Gustav Stresemann, statesman during the Weimar Republic and recipient of the Nobel Peace Prize

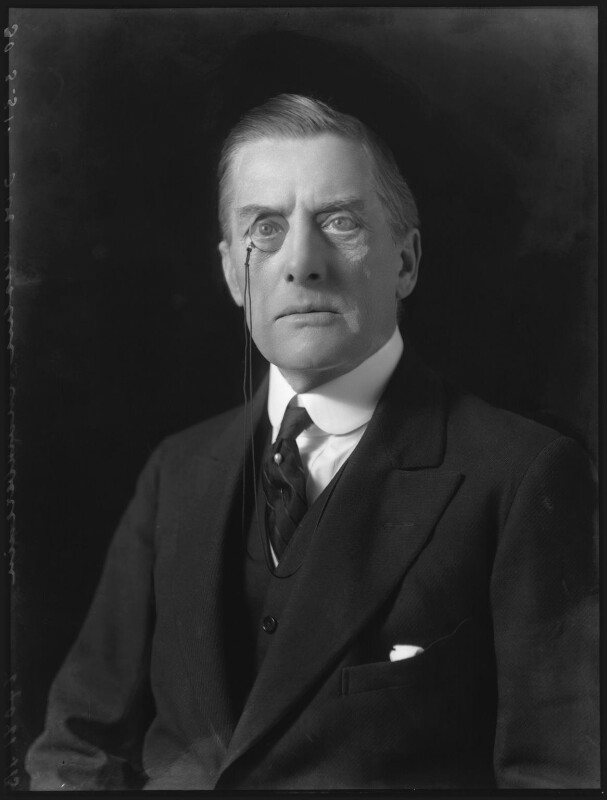
Austen Chamberlain, statesman and recipient of the Nobel Peace Prize

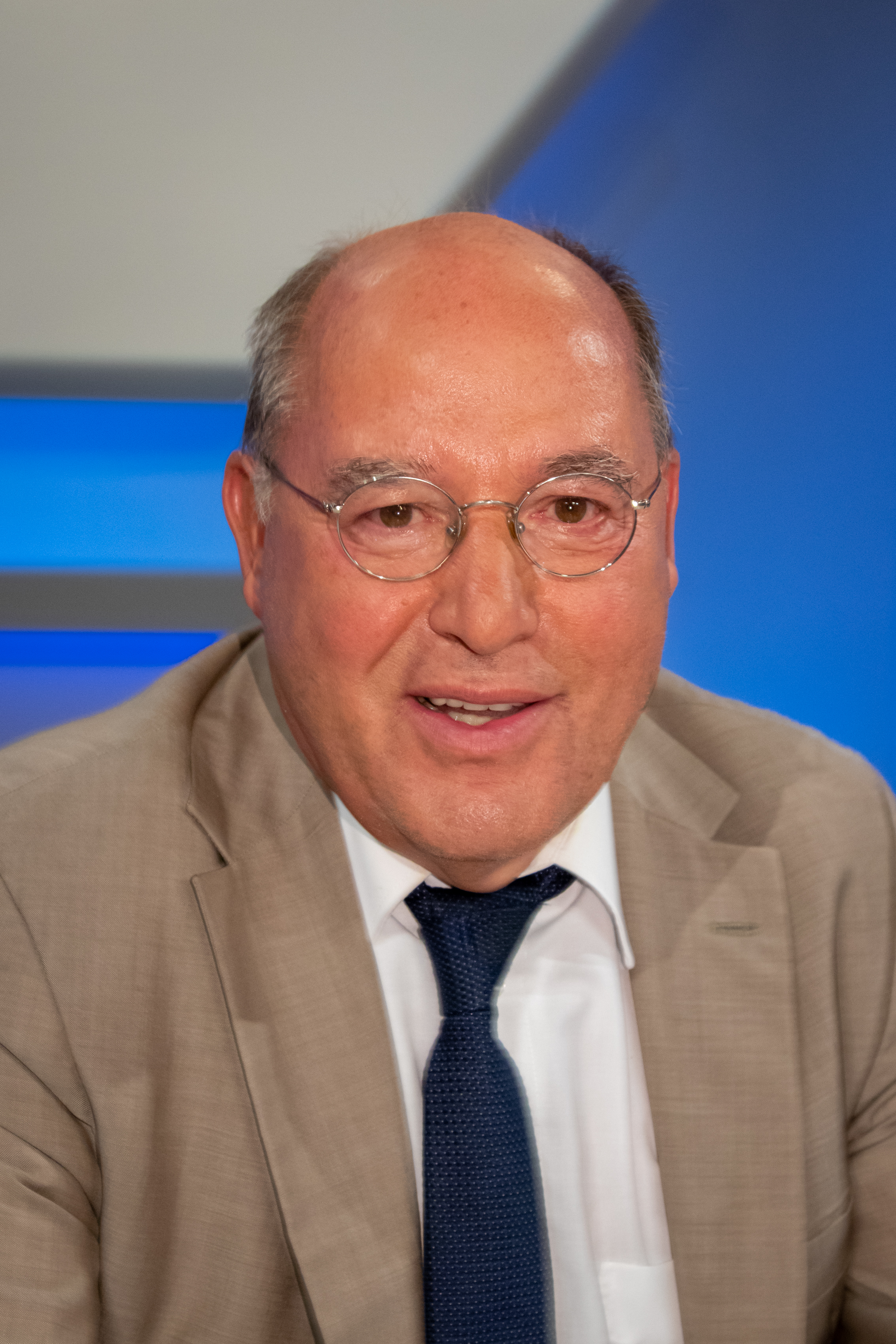
Gregor Gysi, politician, former President of the Party of the European Left, leader of the Left Party

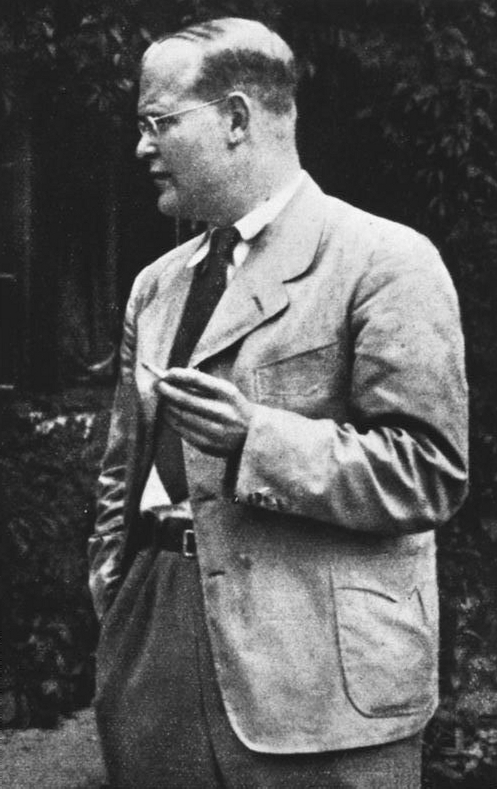
Dietrich Bonhoeffer, theologian, pastor, anti-Nazi dissident, founder of the Confessing Church

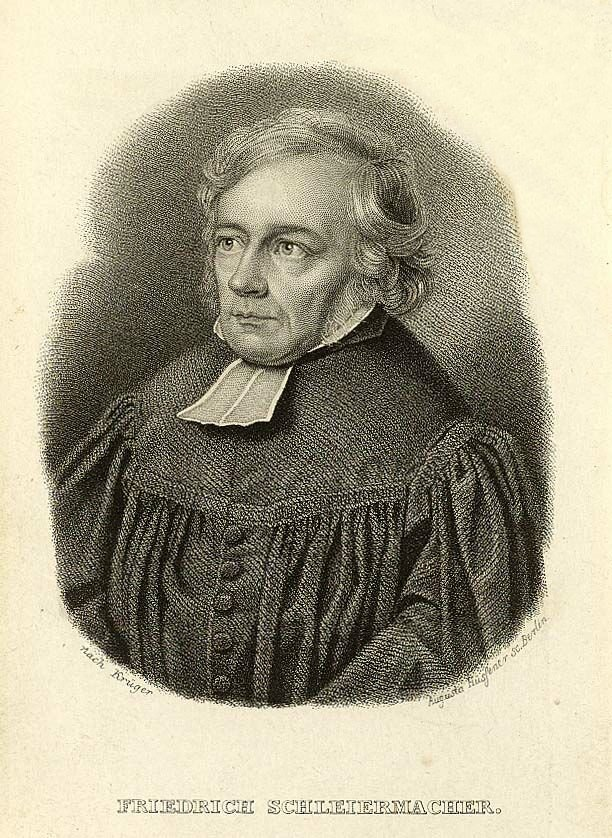
Friedrich Schleiermacher, theologian, philosopher, biblical scholar, considered the "Father of Modern Protestant theology"

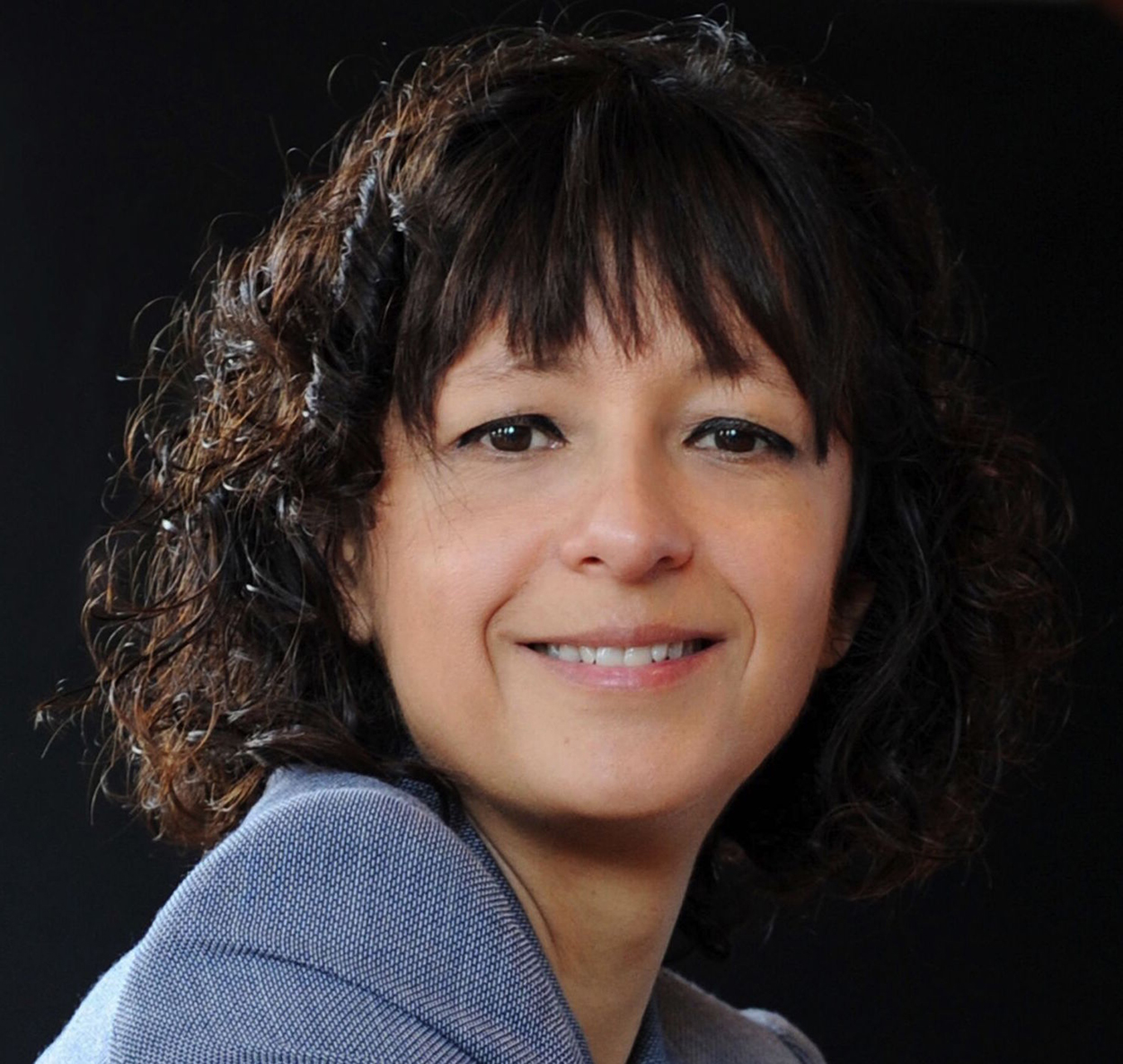
Emmanuelle Charpentier, professor and recipient of the Nobel Prize in Chemistry

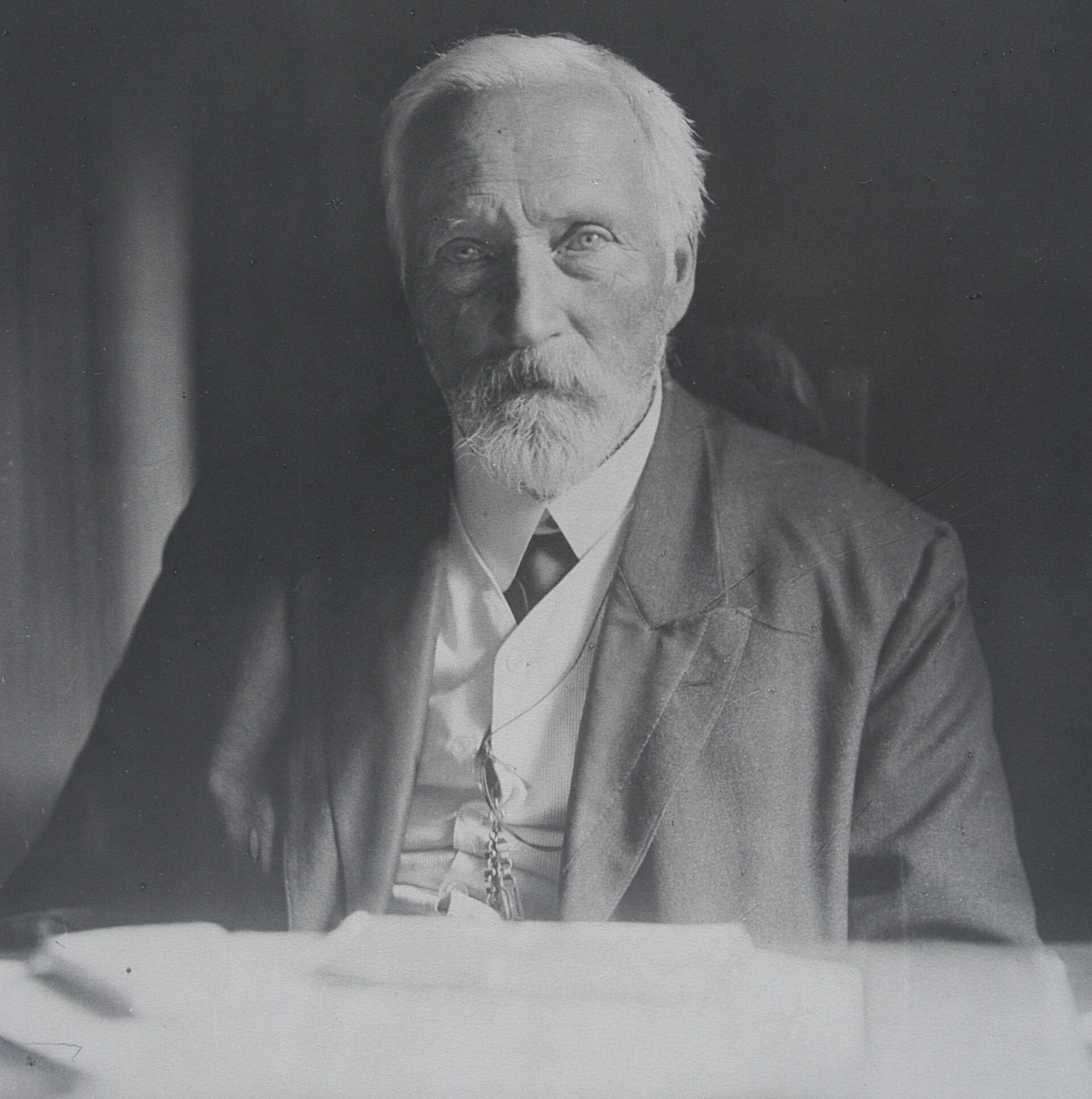
Benedykt Dybowski, professor of Zoology, pioneer of Limnology

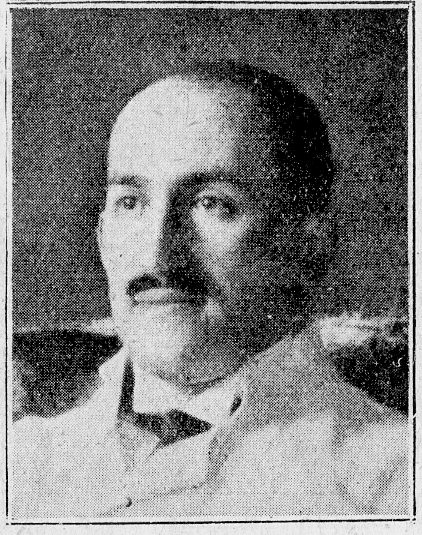
Stefan Rosental, Polish neurologist and psychiatrist

== See also ==
- History of European universities
- Friedrich Althoff
- List of split up universities
