= Centre for British Studies =

German-based research institute

Part of Humboldt University of Berlin, the Centre for British Studies /Großbritannienzentrum (GBZ) is an interdisciplinary institute committed to teaching and research focused on the United Kingdom. In addition to interdisciplinary research projects and its postgraduate "M.A. British Studies" course, the Centre offers a broad range of events for the public. The GBZ is the only of its kind in the German-speaking world.

== History ==
The Centre for British Studies is an interdisciplinary research and teaching institute at Humboldt University. Inaugurated on 15 July 1995 by the governing mayor of Berlin and the British ambassador, the Centre celebrated its twentieth anniversary in the summer of 2015. The Centre was established in recognition of the UK’s role as one of the Western powers which protected West-Berlin during the Cold War. Queen Elizabeth II had already taken an interest in the plan to establish such a centre on her state visit to Berlin in 1992. Subsequently, the Prince of Wales paid his respect to the GBZ on the occasion of his visit at the end of 1995. The purpose of the Centre is to offer an institutional framework for interdisciplinary research, for teaching British Studies, and for furthering public relations between Britain and Germany. As an area studies institute the Centre is part of a larger network of area studies departments of the Berlin universities: The Centre for French Studies (now at Free University), the John F. Kennedy Institute for North American Studies (Free University), the Department for Northern European Studies at the (Humboldt University) and the Centre for Modern Oriental Studies Due to its interdisciplinary nature the GBZ is not part of one of the faculties of the Humboldt University, but enjoys the status of an independent institute with three chairs: for British Literature and Culture, for legal, economic and social structures of the UK, and for British History.

== The study programme ==
The Centre for British Studies launched the postgraduate study programme “Master in British Studies” (today "M.A. British Studies) in 1999. It is designed for German and international graduate students from all academic disciplines. The programme lasts a total of four semesters, the first two of which constitute the taught element of the course (certificate phase) and take place at the Centre in Berlin. Teaching is offered not only by full-time staff working at the Centre, but also by guest lecturers from the UK and representatives of British companies and institutions. In the “core programme”, which takes place during the first semester, the students are familiarised with the history, legal structures, literature, art, economic- and social history, the political system as well as the social structures of the UK. In the second semester the students can choose between six options that are to prepare them for the labour market. Following the certificate phase, the students are required to undertake a three-month work placement in the UK in order to acquire direct experience of working and living cultures in the UK. Subsequently, the students complete the course programme by writing and submitting a Master Thesis, whose theme may be selected by the student, and which should be related to one of the wide range of topics that were addressed in the programme. The successful graduates are awarded the degree “M.A. British Studies”.

== Other institutions ==
Following the foundation of the Centre for British Studies at the Humboldt University of Berlin, other Centres for British Studies have also been founded at the University of Applied Sciences Zittau/ Görlitz in 1999 and at the University of Bamberg in 2000.

== Sources ==
- Gerlach, Rita, "Lord Patten besuchte das Großbritannien-Zentrum", in: HUMBOLDT, 02.11.2006, p. 2
- Gerlach, Rita, „Very British, indeed. Extra-Seite zum 10-jährigen Bestehen des GBZ“, in: HUMBOLDT, 09.06.2005, S. 3 (https://web.archive.org/web/20061209210536/http://www2.hu-berlin.de/gbz/archive/pressarchive/press06_05.pdf)
- Pütz, Stefanie, „Britische Eigenheiten verstehen. Aufbaustudiengang "Master in British Studies" soll interkulturelle Kompetenz vermitteln“, in: Der Tagesspiegel, 23.11.1999
- Riege, Birgit, „Erfolgreiche Annäherungsversuche. Das Großbritannien-Zentrum der Humboldt-Universität feiert heute sein 10-jähriges Bestehen“, in: Berliner Zeitung, 29.06.2005
- Warnecke, Tilmann. „Studieren mit Jobgarantie. Karriere-Check: Welche Absolventen aus Berlin und Brandenburg besonders gefragt sind“, in: Tagesspiegel, 09.10.2005, S. K1
- Weber, Peter, „Das Wort "Landeskunde" ist tabu“, in: Berliner Morgenpost, 8.11.1999
- http://www.berlin.de/wissenschaftsatlas/einrichtungen/0140.html
- https://web.archive.org/web/20050314060829/http://www.ruhr-uni-bochum.de/britcult/DOinstitutionenSchneider.htm
