= Rory Fleck Byrne =

Irish actor (born 1988)

- Born: 1988 (age 37–38); England
- Occupations: Actor, composer
- Years active: 2005–present

Rory Fleck Byrne (born 1988) is an Irish actor and composer, known for Vampire Academy (2014), Harlots, The Foreigner (both 2017) and This Is Going to Hurt (2022).

== Early life ==
Rory Fleck Byrne was born in England. He moved to Ireland when he was nine years old and lived in Kilkenny until he moved to London in 2007 to train at the Royal Academy of Dramatic Art, graduating in 2010.

== Career ==
Fleck Byrne's first acting job was in Liverpool in the play Antony and Cleopatra opposite Kim Cattrall. In 2014, Fleck Byrne could be seen as Harry Abrams, an assistant of the psychological researcher Joseph Coupland, in the horror film The Quiet Ones. In 2016, he played Ruby in the film Tiger Raid. In 2017, he starred as Daniel Marney in eight episodes of Harlots, a drama series about Georgian-era brothels, and the women working there. Fleck Byrne's character Daniel falls in love with the madam of a low-class brothel. Later in 2017, he starred opposite Jackie Chan and Pierce Brosnan in The Foreigner. Fleck Byrne played Brosnan's nephew Sean Morrison, a former British royal navy officer. He later stated that up to then this was one of the best and most challenging experiences he had ever had. He had to train with a stunt team to fight martial arts and get into the mind of a hit-man. As he enjoyed martial arts so much he continued to train it after the film was finished with a personal trainer in London. Fleck Byrne also worked as an actor, writer and producer in the short films Inbox and Bodies. Bodies was set in his hometown Kilkenny. It is about the relationship of two funeral directors who struggle to stay connected to life. Inbox was released with help of the crowdfunding website Kickstarter. In 2021, Fleck Byrne directed, wrote, and starred in the short film Dash. In September 2023, Byrne appeared in the Channel 5 drama series The Inheritance, appearing alongside Samantha Bond, Jemima Rooper, Gaynor Faye, Rob James-Collier, Larry Lamb and Adil Ray.

Next to appearing in films and television series, Fleck Byrne has also acted on stage, in plays including King Charles III (2014–2015), Anna Karenina (2016) and The Phlebotomist (2018).

In 2023, Fleck Byrne wrote and directed the short film In Heat, starring Ben Whishaw and funded by BFI and Film4's Future Takes programme. The film premiered at the 2024 BFI London Film Festival.

== Personal life ==
Byrne lives in London.

Next to acting, Byrne also enjoys singing. In an interview he mentioned that if he had not become an actor, he would have loved to have been the frontman of a band. He also writes his own songs.

He is gay.

== Filmography ==
=== Film ===
Year	Title	Role	Notes
2005	Stealaway	Mike Sullivan	
2006	Lily's Bad Day	Liam	
2014	The Quiet Ones	Harry Abrams	
2014	Vampire Academy	Andre Dragomir	
2015	Bodies	Conor	Short film
2016	Tiger Raid	Ruby	
2017	Inbox	Tom	Short film
2017	The Foreigner	Sean Morrison	
2018	Vita & Virginia	Geoffrey Scott	
2020	Pixie	Colin	
2022	LOLA	Lieutenant Sebastian Holloway	
2023	Falling Into Place	Aidan	
2023	In Camera	Actor B	
2023	White Widow	Cillian	
2023	In Heat		Writer/Director; Short Film

=== Television ===
Year	Title	Role	Notes
2010	Jack Taylor	Alan	Episode: "Purgatory"
2014	Grantchester	Ben Blackwood	Episode #1.4
2014	Damo and Ivor	Liam Delaney	Recurring role; 5 episodes
2016	Midsomer Murders	Dale Nevins	Episode: "Harvest of Souls"
2016	To Walk Invisible	Arthur Nicholls	Television film
2017	Harlots	Daniel Marney	Recurring role; 8 episodes
2018	Death in Paradise	Adam Warner	Episode: "Murder on the Day of the Dead"
2019	Ghosts	Toby Nightingale	Episode: "Free Pass"
2019	Agatha and the Curse of Ishtar	Marmaduke	Television film
2019	Zomboat!	Rob	2 episodes
2020	Spides	Marty	2 episodes
2022	This Is Going to Hurt	Harry Muir	Miniseries; 7 episodes
2023	The Inheritance	Nathan	Miniseries; 4 episodes
2023	The Newsreader	Gerry Carroll	Season 2 regular; 6 episodes
2024–2025	Conflict	Joshua Belfort	Miniseries; 5 episodes
2025	Dope Girls	Luca Salucci	6 episodes

== Theatre ==
Year	Title	Role	Theatre	Location	Ref.
2010	Antony and Cleopatra	Demetrius/Dollabella	Liverpool Playhouse	Liverpool	
2011	Cause Célèbre	Ewen Montagu	The Old Vic	London	
2011	Disco Pigs	Pig	Young Vic	London	
2011	The Lion in Winter	Philip	Theatre Royal Haymarket	London	
2013	That Face	Henry	Landor Theatre	London	
2014	The Vortex	Nicky Lancaster	Gate Theatre	Dublin	
2014	The Well Rested Terroris	Singer	Peacock Theatre	Dublin	
2014–2015	King Charles III	William	Wyndham's Theatre	London	
2016	Anna Karenina	Vronsky	Abbey Theatre	Dublin	
2018	The Phlebotomist	Aaron	Hampstead Downstairs	London	
2022–2023	Othello	Michael Cassio	Lyttelton Theatre	London	

== Radio work ==
Year	Title	Type	Role	Ref.
2014	Juno and the Paycock	BBC Radio 4 drama	Johnny Boyle	
2018	Vive la Republique	BBC Radio 4 drama	Daniel Cohn-Bendit	
