= Weekend (talk show) =

News television series

- Genre: Lifestyle; Talk show
- Presented by: Aled Jones
- Country of origin: United Kingdom
- Original language: English
- No. of seasons: 4
- No. of episodes: 166+8 specials

Production
- Camera setup: Multi-camera
- Running time: 55 minutes (inc. adverts)
- Production companies: Cactus TV (for ITV Breakfast)

Original release
- Network: ITV
- Release: 26 April 2014 – 3 September 2017

Related
- Good Morning Britain (2014–); Lorraine (2010–)

Weekend is a British lifestyle show that aired on ITV from 26 April 2014 to 3 September 2017 and was presented by Aled Jones. On 22 March 2018 ITV announced that the show had been cancelled.

== Format ==
Weekend featured a mixture of chat and musical guests.

Aled Jones presented the programme on Saturday and Sunday mornings. Of this appointment, Jones said "What more can I ask for than a mix of all of the things I love! It's a dream come true to present a show I've always wanted to watch and I can't wait to get started".

The show also had a feature on people with strange talents or hobbies, called 'We're Talking in the Air', a pun on "Walking in the Air", a song famously covered by Jones.

Experts

- Stephen Bailey
- Georgie Barrat
- Lucie Cave
- Tom Craine
- Rhianna Dhillon
- Alison Hammond
- Boyd Hilton
- James King
- Patrick Monahan
- David Morgan
- Rebecca Perfect
- Craig Stevens
- Iain Stirling
- Ella Williamson

== Production ==
Episodes of Weekend were pre-recorded at the Cactus Studios in London.

== Transmissions ==
=== Regular series ===
| Series | Start date | End date | Episodes |
|---|---|---|---|
| 1 | 26 April 2014 | 7 September 2014 | 40 |
| 2 | 18 April 2015 | 6 September 2015 | 42 |
| 3 | 16 April 2016 | 4 September 2016 | 42 |
| 4 | 15 April 2017 | 3 September 2017 | 42 |

=== Christmas specials ===
| Series | Start date | End date | Episodes |
|---|---|---|---|
| 1 | 25 December 2014 | 28 December 2014 | 4 |
| 2 | 25 December 2015 | 27 December 2015 | 2 |
| 3 | 24 December 2016 | 25 December 2016 | 2 |

== Episodes ==
=== Series 1 ===
| # | Date | Guests |
|---|---|---|
| 1 | 26 April 2014 | Sophie Ellis-Bextor, Michelle Collins and Rufus Hound |
| 2 | 27 April 2014 | Sam Bailey, Keith Duffy and David Garrett |
| 3 | 3 May 2014 | Sheila Hancock, James Argent, Embrace and Danny Wallace |
| 4 | 4 May 2014 | Engelbert Humperdinck, Lloyd Owen, Imelda Staunton and Amanda Byram |
| 5 | 10 May 2014 | Kian Egan, Sarah Beeny and Stephen Mulhern |
| 6 | 11 May 2014 | Lisa Stansfield, Samia Ghadie and Tom Conti |
| 7 | 17 May 2014 | Gaby Roslin, The Saturdays and Foxes |
| 8 | 18 May 2014 | Stephen Mangan, Sharon Small and Matt Cardle |
| 9 | 24 May 2014 | Stephanie Cole, Mark Benton and Peter Andre |
| 10 | 25 May 2014 | Nina Wadia, Gaynor Faye, Ross Kemp and Bernhoft |
| 11 | 31 May 2014 | Jenny Eclair, Chris Tarrant, Ashley Roberts and Jersey Boys |
| 12 | 1 June 2014 | Brian Conley, Martin Kemp, Ada Nicodemou, Ray Meagher and The Hoosiers |
| 13 | 7 June 2014 | Shaun Williamson, Sunetra Sarker, Sara Bareilles and Collabro |
| 14 | 8 June 2014 | Debra Stephenson, Verity Rushworth, Charlotte Jaconelli and Imelda May |
| 15 | 14 June 2014 | Gregory Porter, Penn & Teller and Rebecca Adlington |
| 16 | 15 June 2014 | Les Dennis, Christopher Biggins, Lynda La Plante and Clean Bandit |
| 17 | 21 June 2014 | Arlene Phillips, Pamela Stephenson, Jason Mraz and Razorlight |
| 18 | 22 June 2014 | Joey Essex, Milton Jones, Joel Dommett, Ruthie Henshall and The Gypsy Queens |
| 19 | 28 June 2014 | Rebecca Front, Tracy-Ann Oberman and Curtis Stigers |
| 20 | 29 June 2014 | Blake Harrison, Charley Boorman, Kate Adie and Bellowhead |
| 21 | 5 July 2014 | Kimberley Walsh, Lisa Faulkner, Amanda Lamb and Alistair Griffin |
| 22 | 6 July 2014 | John Barrowman, Alexandra Burke, Matt Edmondson and Lissie |
| 23 | 12 July 2014 | Ashleigh & Pudsey, Gary Numan, Chesney Hawkes and The Shires |
| 24 | 13 July 2014 | Alison Steadman, Samantha Bond and Collabro |
| 25 | 19 July 2014 | Shobna Gulati, Denise Van Outen, Anita Rani and Ward Thomas |
| 26 | 20 July 2014 | Nicky Campbell, Ben Shephard, Paul Heaton and Jacqui Abbott |
| 27 | 26 July 2014 | Robert Powell, Jason Donovan, Katy Brand and the cast of Let It Be Live |
| 28 | 27 July 2014 | Christian Jessen, Kerrie Hayes and Neon Jungle |
| 29 | 2 August 2014 | John Challis, Luisa Zissman, Julian Ovenden and Slow Club |
| 30 | 3 August 2014 | Nicholas Parsons, Jules Knight, Nik and Eva Speakman and Nell Bryden |
| 31 | 9 August 2014 | Adam Garcia, Jodie Prenger and Pixie Lott |
| 32 | 10 August 2014 | Kelvin Fletcher, Crissy Rock and Grant Nicholas |
| 33 | 16 August 2014 | Kathy Lette, Terry Mynott and Kingsland Road |
| 34 | 17 August 2014 | Jon Culshaw, Ian "H" Watkins, Tony Hadley and Imogen Heap |
| 35 | 23 August 2014 | Russ Abbot, Philip Jackson, Georgia May Foote and Lucy Kay |
| 36 | 24 August 2014 | Richard Madeley, Deborah Meaden and The Magic Numbers |
| 37 | 30 August 2014 | Ross Noble, Kerry Ellis, Jamie Shelton and Amelia Lily |
| 38 | 31 August 2014 | Gary Lucy, Tyger Drew-Honey, Jemima Rooper and Sheppard |
| 39 | 6 September 2014 | Alistair McGowan, Jim Carter, Omid Djalili and Deacon Blue |
| 40 | 7 September 2014 | Simon Callow, Alesha Dixon and Anastacia |

Christmas specials

| # | Date | Guests |
|---|---|---|
| 1 | 25 December 2014 | Status Quo, Matt Barber and Tim Vine |
| 2 | 26 December 2014 | Jamie Cullum, Claire King and Ben Caplan |
| 3 | 27 December 2014 | Michael Ball, Mark Charnock and Professor Green |
| 4 | 28 December 2014 | Gino D'Acampo, Union J, Kelly Adams and Andy Burrows |

=== Series 2 ===
| # | Date | Guests |
|---|---|---|
| 1 | 18 April 2015 | Pixie Lott, Jo Joyner and Texas |
| 2 | 19 April 2015 | Helen George, Jason Merrells and Jack Savoretti |
| 3 | 25 April 2015 | Charlie Brooks, Lulu and Rebecca Ferguson |
| 4 | 26 April 2015 | Robert Rinder, Shaun Dooley, James Dreyfus and Joshua Radin |
| 5 | 2 May 2015 | Tina Hobley, Jamie Lomas, Phil Davis, Rick Edwards and M.O |
| 6 | 3 May 2015 | Martin Shaw, Tameka Empson, Glynis Barber and Stacey Solomon |
| 7 | 9 May 2015 | Natalie Anderson, Debra Stephenson and David Gray |
| 8 | 10 May 2015 | Vic Reeves, Sam Faiers and Rae Morris |
| 9 | 16 May 2015 | Alex James, Siân Reeves, Tyger Drew-Honey and Stornoway |
| 10 | 17 May 2015 | Will Mellor, Joe Sims, Jasper Carrott and Katzenjammer |
| 11 | 23 May 2015 | Shayne Ward, Wet Wet Wet and Ella Eyre |
| 12 | 24 May 2015 | Dom Joly, Dan Snow, Brenda Blethyn and Blitz Kids |
| 13 | 30 May 2015 | Mark Benton, Kate Humble, Charley Boorman and Lawson |
| 14 | 31 May 2015 | John Suchet, Shaun Escoffery, The Shires and Jon Regen |
| 15 | 6 June 2015 | Billy Boyd, Elizabeth Berrington, Gemma Oaten and Kacey Musgraves |
| 16 | 7 June 2015 | Simon Webbe, Pauline McLynn, Sally Ann Matthews and The Staves |
| 17 | 13 June 2015 | Laura Linney, Kimberly Wyatt and Andreya Triana |
| 18 | 14 June 2015 | Francesca Annis, Pete Waterman, Hilary Devey and Gaz Coombes |
| 19 | 20 June 2015 | Sammy Winward, Arlene Phillips and Oritse Williams |
| 20 | 21 June 2015 | Alfie Boe, Jane McDonald, Felicity Kendal and Jack Pack |
| 21 | 27 June 2015 | Alesha Dixon, Jake Quickenden, Sharon Small and Kerri Watt |
| 22 | 28 June 2015 | Jason Donovan, Sian Reese-Williams and Toploader |
| 23 | 4 July 2015 | Craig Revel Horwood, Nina Wadia, Tony Audenshaw and Vintage Trouble |
| 24 | 5 July 2015 | Nathan Sykes, Connie Fisher, Fabrice Muamba and Bleachers |
| 25 | 11 July 2015 | Jane Asher, Midge Ure, Denise Lewis and Lucy Rose |
| 26 | 12 July 2015 | Sally Phillips, Sam Nixon, Mark Rhodes, Marcus Brigstocke and Kodaline |
| 27 | 18 July 2015 | Katherine Ryan and Little Mix |
| 28 | 19 July 2015 | Ricardo Antonio Chavira, Dr. Dawn Harper, Brian Capron and Andy Grammer |
| 29 | 25 July 2015 | Lesley Joseph, Adam Hills, Jamie Bower and Andrea Faustini |
| 30 | 26 July 2015 | Rebecca Front, Edith Bowman, Jenny Eclair and Bear's Den |
| 31 | 1 August 2015 | Adam Richman, Rachel Platten and Will Young |
| 32 | 2 August 2015 | Charley Webb, Cerys Matthews, Amelia Lily and Little Boots |
| 33 | 8 August 2015 | Robert Powell, Duncan James, JB Gill and The Fratellis |
| 34 | 9 August 2015 | Wendi Peters, Mark Durden-Smith and Sarah Harding |
| 35 | 15 August 2015 | Joe McElderry, Anton Du Beke, Alex Horne and Conrad Sewell |
| 36 | 16 August 2015 | Preeya Kalidas, Antony Cotton, Shaggy and Liam Bailey |
| 37 | 22 August 2015 | Jeremy Sheffield, Konnie Huq, Collabro and Lemar |
| 38 | 23 August 2015 | Louis Walsh, John Michie, Gizzi Erskine and HomeTown |
| 39 | 29 August 2015 | Rufus Hound, Nigel Havers, Melvin Odoom and Nerina Pallot |
| 40 | 30 August 2015 | Brian McFadden, Dave Gorman, Freddie Fox and Jess and the Bandits |
| 41 | 5 September 2015 | Denis Lawson, Tracy-Ann Oberman, Dominic Brunt and Gabrielle Aplin |
| 42 | 6 September 2015 | Bill Bailey, Joanna Scanlan, Kelly Hoppen and Scouting for Girls |

Christmas specials

| # | Date | Guests |
|---|---|---|
| 1 | 25 December 2015 | Laura Fraser, James Morrison and Leona Lewis |
| 2 | 27 December 2015 | Alexander Armstrong, Rafe Spall and The Corrs |

=== Series 3 ===
| # | Date | Guests |
|---|---|---|
| 1 | 16 April 2016 | Julian Fellowes, Ian Puleston-Davies, Denise Black and Newton Faulkner |
| 2 | 17 April 2016 | Ashley Banjo, Samantha Bond, Colin Jackson and Vangoffey |
| 3 | 23 April 2016 | Anne Archer, Richard Kind, Jamie Foreman and The Feeling |
| 4 | 24 April 2016 | Jimmy Osmond, Adrian Dunbar and Ronan Keating |
| 5 | 30 April 2016 | Arabella Weir, Paul Young, Sean Kelly and Julian Ovenden |
| 6 | 1 May 2016 | Sarah Alexander, Nick Knowles, Amanda Redman and Gavin James |
| 7 | 7 May 2016 | David Haig, Jenny Seagrove, Lisa Maxwell and BB Diamond |
| 8 | 8 May 2016 | Lisa Riley, Jean-Michel Jarre, Ruby Wax and Tanita Tikaram |
| 9 | 14 May 2016 | Chris Packham, Michael Socha, Claire Sweeney and Highasakite |
| 10 | 15 May 2016 | Martin Shaw, Russell Kane, Phyllis Logan and Sarah Blasko |
| 11 | 21 May 2016 | Tony Parsons, Emilia Fox and Vincent Niclo |
| 12 | 22 May 2016 | Jo Frost, Christine Bottomley and Katherine Jenkins |
| 13 | 28 May 2016 | Howard Charles, Noel Fitzpatrick, James Fleet and Thomas Rhett |
| 14 | 29 May 2016 | Russell T Davies, Helen Monks, Wayne Sleep and ABC |
| 15 | 4 June 2016 | Gyles Brandreth, Melvyn Bragg, Maddy Hill and The Dunwells |
| 16 | 5 June 2016 | Hugh Dennis, Josie Lawrence, Patricia Clarkson and Max Jury |
| 17 | 11 June 2016 | Fern Britton, Stefan Dennis, Dick Strawbridge and Dexys |
| 18 | 12 June 2016 | Ruthie Henshall, Michael Brandon, Kate Mulgrew and Ladyhawke |
| 19 | 18 June 2016 | Adam Henson, Warwick Davis, Charlotte Bellamy and Turin Brakes |
| 20 | 19 June 2016 | Rhod Gilbert, Dan Brocklebank and The Vamps |
| 21 | 25 June 2016 | Samantha Barks, Lin Blakley, Richard Coles and Mystery Jets |
| 22 | 26 June 2016 | Anneka Rice, Hal Cruttenden, John McArdle and Clare Maguire |
| 23 | 2 July 2016 | Martina Cole, Joel Dommett and Billy Ocean |
| 24 | 3 July 2016 | Miriam Margolyes, Patti Clare, Nia Vardalos and Skye and Ross |
| 25 | 9 July 2016 | Tony Hadley, Penelope Wilton, Jason Byrne and Bright Light Bright Light |
| 26 | 10 July 2016 | Ray Mears, Omid Djalili, Rula Lenska and Kandace Springs |
| 27 | 16 July 2016 | Anita Dobson, Kerry Godliman, Rory Bremner and Corinne Bailey Rae |
| 28 | 17 July 2016 | Pam St. Clement, Kimberley Nixon and Travis |
| 29 | 23 July 2016 | Bryan Adams, Alexandra Burke, Miles Jupp and Gregory Porter |
| 30 | 24 July 2016 | Jay Rayner, Tanya Franks and Rick Astley |
| 31 | 30 July 2016 | Richard Wilson, Angus Deayton, Nina Conti, Jonas Blue and JP Cooper |
| 32 | 31 July 2016 | Brian Blessed, Pete Firman, Tamsin Greig and Calum Scott |
| 33 | 6 August 2016 | David Emanuel, Katie Derham, Jeff Stelling and The Veronicas |
| 34 | 7 August 2016 | Katherine Merry, Beverley Knight, Brian Cox and Brett Domino |
| 35 | 13 August 2016 | Alistair McGowan, Peter Egan, Anna Richardson and The Beach |
| 36 | 14 August 2016 | Eddie "The Eagle" Edwards, Matthew Kelly and Pixie Lott |
| 37 | 20 August 2016 | Gwen Taylor, Lucy Spraggan, Colson Smith and Black Dylan |
| 38 | 21 August 2016 | Yvette Fielding, Tony Christie, Jo Hartley and Imani |
| 39 | 27 August 2016 | Stephen Mulhern, Micky Dolenz and Lucie Silvas |
| 40 | 28 August 2016 | Stefanie Powers, Martin Roberts and Chris de Burgh |
| 41 | 3 September 2016 | Paul McKenna, Kate Richardson-Walsh and Sophie Ellis-Bextor |
| 42 | 4 September 2016 | Elaine Paige, Mark Gatiss, Shane Filan and Izzy Bizu |

Christmas specials

| # | Date | Guests |
|---|---|---|
| 1 | 24 December 2016 | Katherine Parkinson, Craig Charles, Mark Benton and Pixie Geldof |
| 2 | 25 December 2016 | Rosemary Shrager and Vaults |

=== Series 4 ===
| # | Date | Guests |
|---|---|---|
| 1 | 15 April 2017 | Arlene Phillips, Simon Callow, Paul McKenna and Nell Bryden |
| 2 | 16 April 2017 | Ore Oduba, Les Dennis, Samantha Womack, Mica Paris and Marti Pellow |
| 3 | 22 April 2017 | Dennis Quaid, Gok Wan, Brenda Blethyn and Marti Pellow |
| 4 | 23 April 2017 | Gaynor Faye, Noel Fitzpatrick, Josie Lawrence and Mike + The Mechanics |
| 5 | 29 April 2017 | Nick Knowles, Lisa Faulkner, Russell Watson and Jack Savoretti |
| 6 | 30 April 2017 | Gloria Hunniford, Fiona Phillips, Anthony Head and LP |
| 7 | 6 May 2017 | Mark Foster, Kayvan Novak, Tom Lister and Amy Macdonald |
| 8 | 7 May 2017 | Brian Conley, Katherine Ryan, Marc Baylis and Collabro |
| 9 | 13 May 2017 | Nicky Campbell, Charlie Condou, Cerys Matthews and Yes Lad |
| 10 | 14 May 2017 | Stacey Solomon, Jason Manford, Richard Jones and Becky Hill |
| 11 | 20 May 2017 | Milton Jones, Amanda Lamb, Charlotte Bellamy, John Middleton and Sound of the Sirens |
| 12 | 21 May 2017 | Kacey Ainsworth, Christopher Harper, Engelbert Humperdinck and Sarah Darling |
| 13 | 27 May 2017 | Katy Brand, Paul Zerdin and Una Healy |
| 14 | 28 May 2017 | Rick Edwards, Ed Westwick, Gareth Gates and AJRBrothers |
| 15 | 3 June 2017 | Joe Wicks, Jon Culshaw, André Rieu and Charlie Fink |
| 16 | 4 June 2017 | Jackie Woodburne, Laura Whitmore, Sheree Murphy and the cast of Beautiful: The Carole King Musical |
| 17 | 10 June 2017 | Iain Glen, Ruby Wax, and Elkie Brooks |
| 18 | 11 June 2017 | Nina Wadia, Larry Lamb, Tony Robinson and Ward Thomas |
| 19 | 17 June 2017 | Gareth Malone, Phil Davis, Jonathan Forbes and EARL |
| 20 | 18 June 2017 | Brendan Gleeson, Steve Backshall and Charlie Puth |
| 21 | 24 June 2017 | Rufus Hound, Sally Lindsay and Steps |
| 22 | 25 June 2017 | The Jacksons, Alastair Campbell and Procol Harum |
| 23 | 1 July 2017 | Melvyn Bragg, Jane Asher, Michel Roux Jr. and Callum Beattie |
| 24 | 2 July 2017 | Nile Rodgers, Ciarán Hinds, Jacqui Abbott and Paul Heaton |
| 25 | 8 July 2017 | Shappi Khorsandi, Melanie Sykes, Haydn Gwynne and Bleachers |
| 26 | 9 July 2017 | Adil Ray, Ranvir Singh, Joe Pasquale, Ella Eyre and Sigala |
| 27 | 15 July 2017 | Joe McElderry, Russell Grant, Kathy Lette and Nerina Pallot |
| 28 | 16 July 2017 | Louis Smith, Ray Mears, Anna Richardson and Lucy Rose |
| 29 | 22 July 2017 | Ross Kemp, Jonathan Wrather, Jenny Eclair and Betsy |
| 30 | 23 July 2017 | Stephen K. Amos, Greg James, Tom Chambers and the cast of School of Rock |
| 31 | 29 July 2017 | Adam Garcia, Lydia Bright, Candice Brown and Skinny Living |
| 32 | 30 July 2017 | Pat Sharp, Sharon Small and Texas |
| 33 | 5 August 2017 | Jimmy Osmond, Antony Costa, Sarah Jayne Dunn and Rae Morris |
| 34 | 6 August 2017 | Vicky Pattison, Jason Byrne, Jack Ellis and The Coronas |
| 35 | 12 August 2017 | Andy Parsons, Camilla Dallerup, Touker Suleyman and Carly Paoli |
| 36 | 13 August 2017 | Joel Dommett, Katie Derham, Gyles Brandreth and Ten Millennia |
| 37 | 19 August 2017 | Sarah Hadland, Anthony Horowitz, Simon Webbe and Jerry Williams |
| 38 | 20 August 2017 | Alex James, Fiona Wade and Martine McCutcheon |
| 39 | 26 August 2017 | Charlie Brooks, Jake Humphrey, Martin Shaw and Starley |
| 40 | 27 August 2017 | Dave Berry, Christian Cooke, Melvin Odoom and the cast of Motown: The Musical |
| 41 | 2 September 2017 | Jessie Wallace, Fay Ripley, Kieron Richardson and Jamie Lawson |
| 42 | 3 September 2017 | Jane McDonald, John Suchet, Shane Filan and White Buffalo |
