= Larry Lamb =

English actor and radio presenter (born 1947)

- Born: Lawrence Douglas Lamb; 1 October 1947 (age 79); Edmonton, Middlesex, England
- Occupations: Actor; radio presenter
- Years active: 1975–present
- Spouses: Anita Wisbey (m. 1969; div. 1970) Linda Martin (m. 1979; div. 1996)
- Partners: Clare Burt (1996–2016); Marie Victorine (2016–present)
- Children: 4, including George

Lawrence Douglas Lamb (born 1 October 1947) is an English actor and radio presenter. He played Archie Mitchell in the BBC soap opera EastEnders, Michael Shipman in the BBC comedy series Gavin & Stacey and Ted Case in the final series of the BBC drama New Tricks. He also appeared on I'm a Celebrity...Get Me Out of Here! in 2016.

== Early life ==
Lamb was born in Edmonton, Middlesex, to Jessie White and Ronald Douglas Lamb, the eldest of four including his brother, Wesley, and a sister Penelope. Lamb had a turbulent childhood; he was verbally abused by his father and often had to keep his parents from fighting.

In 2011, Lamb participated in the BBC series Who Do You Think You Are? and discovered that he is descended from a line of proprietors of a well-known travelling menagerie, Day's Menagerie, and a lion tamer named Martini Bartlett.

Lamb attended Edmonton County School and on leaving school he worked as a lorry driver's mate (assistant) for, at that time, the UK's largest Waste Paper Merchant, J & J Maybank. Later, he worked as an encyclopaedia salesman, before joining the oil industry, which resulted in his working in Libya and Canada, where he attended St. Francis Xavier University in Antigonish, Nova Scotia. This developed his amateur interest in acting to a professional level, and he performed at Canada's Stratford Festival in 1975–1976. Lamb is distantly related to Edward Buckton Lamb (1806–1869), a Victorian architect who designed St Martin's Gospel Oak and St Mary Magdalene Church in Addiscombe.

== Career ==
=== Acting ===
After returning to Britain from Canada, Lamb became a regular cast member, along with Kate O'Mara, in the BBC's North Sea ferry-based soap Triangle (1981–83), in which he played Matt Taylor, the ship's chief engineer.

Other credits include The New Avengers, The Professionals, Fox, Minder, Lovejoy, Get Back, A Touch of Frost, Our Friends in the North, Taggart, Casualty, Kavanagh QC, Spooks, Midsomer Murders, and The Bill.

Between 2007 and 2010, Lamb appeared in Gavin & Stacey playing Gavin's father, Michael "Mick" Shipman. He returned to the role for a Christmas special in 2019 and again for the show finale in 2024.

In 2008, Lamb began playing Archie Mitchell, the father of Ronnie and Roxy Mitchell in EastEnders. He based his portrayal of Archie on his own father. He left the show in April 2009, but returned in July the same year, around the same time that Danniella Westbrook returned to her role of Archie's niece, Sam Mitchell. Archie was killed off in a murder story line at Christmas, 2009. In 2009, Lamb starred alongside Liam Cunningham in Blood: The Last Vampire, in the role of General McKee. On 19 February 2010, Lamb appeared with his son, George Lamb, in EastEnders Live: The Aftermath, after Stacey Slater was revealed to be Archie's killer in the closing moments of the 25th-anniversary live episode.

In April 2011, BBC Learning launched "Off By Heart Shakespeare", a school-recital contest for secondary school pupils. For the project, Larry took on the role of Jaques from the play As You Like It, and delivered the speech: "All the world's a stage".

It was announced that Lamb would join the cast of New Tricks as Ted Case in series 12.

Lamb's films include Buster and Essex Boys. In 1983, he had a small speaking role in Superman III.

In September 2023, Lamb appeared in the Channel 5 drama series The Inheritance, appearing alongside Samantha Bond, Jemima Rooper, Gaynor Faye, Robert James-Collier and Adil Ray.

=== Theatre ===
Theatre work includes:

- Educating Rita as Frank - Dir. Jeremy Sams - Chocolate Factory
- The Five Wives of Maurice Pinder as Maurice - Dir. Sarah Frankcom - National Theatre
- Fool for Love as Old Man - Dir. Lindsay Posner - Apollo West End/NIMAX
- The Price as Victor - Dir. Sean Holmes - Tricycle/Apollo West End/National Tour
- Hamlet as Claudius - Dir. Steven Pimlott - RSC
- The Prisoner's Dilemma as The Professor - Dir. Michael Attenborough - RSC
- Art as Marc - Dir. Rachel Kavanaugh - Wyndhams West End
- Inherit the Wind as Drummond - Dir. Dan Crawford - King's Head
- Nine as Guido - Dir. David Leveaux - Donmar
- The Sisters Rosensweig as Kantlowitz - Dir. Michael Blakemore - Old Vic/Greenwich
- Butterfly Kiss as Teddy - Dir Steven Pimlott - Almeida
- Lulu as Rodrigo - Dir. Jonathan Kent - Almeida
- La Musica as Him - Dir. Joseph Blatchley - Hampstead
- Making It Better as The Husband - Dir. Michael Rudman - Hampstead/Criterion West End
- A Madhouse in Goa as Niko/Oliver - Dir. Robert Alan Ackerman - Hammersmith/Apollo West End
- Greenland as Brian - Dir. Simon Curtis - Royal Court
- Insignificance as The Ball Player - Dir. Max Stafford-Clark - Royal Court
- Seduced as Raul - Dir. Les Waters - Royal Court
- Filomena as The Plumber - Dir. Franco Zeffirelli - Lyric West End
- Comedians as George McBrian - Dir. Mike Nicholls - Music Box/Broadway

=== Other work ===
In 2013, Lamb began presenting a regular Sunday morning show on LBC. He is an occasional reporter for the BBC programme The One Show. Lamb took part in Gareth's All Star Choir in 2014, as part of the BBC's Children in Need appeal.

In 2016, he appeared in the sixteenth series of I'm a Celebrity...Get Me Out of Here!. He became the 6th celebrity to be voted out of the jungle in the 2016 series.

== Personal life ==
Lamb's first marriage was to Anita Wisbey, with whom he had a daughter, Vanessa Lamb (born 1969). Lamb stated on I'm A Celebrity...Get Me Out of Here! that Vanessa has a daughter. Lamb's second marriage was to Linda Martin, with whom he has a son, radio DJ and television presenter George Lamb (born 1979).

Lamb was in a relationship with Clare Burt from 1996 to 2014. They had two daughters, Eloise Alexandra (born 1998), and Eva-Mathilde (born 2003). As of 2017, Lamb resided in Cornwall, and was in a relationship with artist Marie Hugo.

Lamb's autobiography Mummy's Boy was published in 2011. In 2025 he published his debut novel All Wrapped Up.

== Awards and nominations ==
Lamb won the award for Best Villain at the 2010 British Soap Awards.

== Bibliography ==
- —— (2011). Mummy's Boy (autobiography). Coronet Books. ISBN 978-1444715279.
- —— (2025). All Wrapped Up (novel). Softwood Books. ISBN 9781838173562.

== Filmography ==
=== Film ===
Year	Title	Role	Notes
1978	Superman	1st Reporter	
1983	Superman III	2nd Miner	
1984	Flight to Berlin	Specialist Dale Sizemore	
1984	My Friend Washington	Ben Carlson	Original title: Mon ami Washington
1985	Shadey	Dick Darnley	
1985	Underworld	Roy Bain	
1986	Ubac	Larry	
1987	Hearts of Fire	Jack Rosner	
1988	Buster	Bruce Reynolds	
1998	Place Vendôme	Christopher Makos	
2000	Essex Boys	Peter Chase	
2000	One of the Hollywood Ten	Will Geer	
2001	Home Sweet Home	(voice)	Documentary film
2004	Deadlines	Paul Baker	
2004	Fakers	Harvey Steed	
2009	Blood: The Last Vampire	General McKee	
2011	Two Minutes	William	Short films
2013	Verona	Capulet	Short films
2014	Rose, Mary and Time	Barney's Dad	Short films
2014	Beachcomber	Stephen	Short films
2015	Meet Pursuit Delange: The Movie	Sam Walters	
2015	The Briny	Peter	Short film
2017	The Hatton Garden Job	Brian Reader	
2017	Rise of the Footsoldier 3: The Pat Tate Story	Mr. Harris	
2019	Brighton	Derek	
2021	Me, Myself and Di	Clifford	
2022	Old Windows	Harry	Short film
2022	Hounded	Gregory	
2025	The 7th Man	Narrator	

=== Television ===
Year	Title	Role	Notes
1977	The New Avengers	Williams	Series 2; episode 6: "Trap"
1979	Hazell	Ned Barrow	Series 2; episode 12: "Hazell and the Public Enemy"
1979	The Dick Francis Thriller: The Racing Game	Steve	Episode 5: "Horsenap"
1980	Armchair Thriller	CPO Chalky White	Series 2; episodes 7–10: "Dead Man's Kit: Parts 1–4"
1980	Fox	Joey Fox	Episodes 1–13
1980	The Professionals	Jack Craine	Series 4; episode 2: "Wild Justice"
1981–1983	Triangle	Matt Taylor	Series 1–3; 78 episodes
1982	Saturday Night Thriller	Albert	Episode 3: "A Gift of Tongues"
1983	Jemima Shore Investigates	Max Highams	Episode 11: "The Damask Collection"
1984	Minder	Greg Collins	Series 4; episode 6: "If Money Be the Food of Love, Play On"
1984	The World Walk	Watkins	Television film
1985	Christopher Columbus	Don Castillo	Mini-series; episodes 1–4
1986	Boon	Alan Prendergast	Series 1; episode 7: "Northwest Passage to Acock's Green"
1986	Slip-Up	Ronald Arthur Biggs	Television film. Alternative title: The Great Paper Chase
1987	Theatre Night	The Sergeant	Series 2; episode 1: "The Devil's Disciple"
1987	Sunday Premiere	Terry Stewart	Episode: "Harry's Kingdom"
1988	Due fratelli	Mauro Barberi	Mini-series; episodes 1–3
1989	Twist of Fate	Davi	Mini-series; Parts I & II. Original / UK title: Pursuit
1990	The Paradise Club	James Dexter	Series 2; episode 6: "Lord of the Files"
1990	A Little Piece of Sunshine	Desmond Hannah	Television film
1991	ScreenPlay	Ron Bannister	Series 6; episode 2: "Broke"
1992	Lovejoy	Gerald Somers	Series 3; episodes 12 & 13: "Highland Fling: Parts One & Two"
1992	Between the Lines	Dennis Ralston	Series 1; episode 12: "Nobody's Fireproof"
1992	Fool's Gold: The Story of the Brink's-Mat Robbery	Kenneth Noye	Television film
1992–1993	Get Back	Albert Sweet	Series 1 & 2; 15 episodes
1994	In Suspicious Circumstances	Weldon Atherstone	Series 4; episodes 9 & 10: "Death Scene: Parts 1 & 2"
1994	White Goods	Jonnie Dow	Television film
1994	Screen One	Ken	Series 6; episode 7: "Doggin' Around"
1994	The Wimbledon Poisoner	Dr. Donald Templeton	Mini-series; episodes 1 & 2
1995	A Touch of Frost	Mike Ross	Series 3; episode 3: "Dead Male One"
1995	Class Act	Jimmy Hunt	Series 2; episode 2
1996	Our Friends in the North	Alan Roe	Mini-series; episodes 6 & 7: "1979" & "1984"
1996	Annie's Bar	Terry Dunning	Episodes 1–10
1996	Strangers	Leonard	Episode 2: "The One You Love"
1997	The Missing Postman	Trevor Ramsay	Television film
1998	Supply & Demand	Det. Supt. Simon Hughes	Mini-series; episodes 1–6
1999	The Blonde Bombshell	Will Humphreys	Mini-series; episodes 1 & 2
1999	Taggart	Martin Strange	Series 16; episode 3: "Fearful Lightning"
1999	Casualty	Father Peter Harker	Series 14; episode 7: "Everybody Hurts"
2001	Kavanagh QC	Alan Rainer	Episode: "The End of Law"
2001	Midsomer Murders	Melvyn Stockard	Series 4; episode 4: "Who Killed Cock Robin?"
2004–2005	The Bill	Jonathan Fox	Series 20 & 21; 20 episodes
2005	Cathedral	Thomas Becket	Mini-series; episodes 1–5
2005	Murphy's Law	George Garvey	Series 3; episodes 3–6
2006	Silent Witness	Max Wheaton	Series 10; episodes 5 & 6: "Body of Work: Parts 1 & 2"
2006	Spooks	Iain Kallis	Series 5; episode 3: "The Cell"
2007–2010, 2019, 2024	Gavin & Stacey	Mick Shipman	All 22 episodes
2008–2010	EastEnders	Archie Mitchell	152 episodes
2013	Love and Marriage	Tommy Sutherland	All 6 episodes
2015	New Tricks	Ted Case	Series 12; episodes 2–10
2017	The Keith & Paddy Picture Show	Dr. Houseman	Series 1; episode 1: "Dirty Dancing"
2017	Mount Pleasant	Callum	Series 7; episode 1: "The Finale"
2019	Pitching In	Frank	All 4 episodes
2019	Thunderbirds Are Go	Gomez (voice)	Series 3; episode 17: "Getaway"
2023	The Inheritance	Dennis	All 4 episodes
2024	Curfew	Rhys	All 6 episodes
2024	Whitstable Pearl	Dickie Masters	Series 3; episode 4: "Prisoners of the Past"
2024	Conflict	Sir Martin Wright	Mini-series; episodes 3 & 4: "Vastarinta" & "Petos"
2025	The Feud	Terry Dobson	Episodes 1–6
2025	Art Detectives	Ron Palmer	4 episodes
