= Conflict (Finnish TV series) =

2024 Finnish TV series

- Also known as: Konflikti
- Genre: War; Drama; Thriller
- Created by: Aku Louhimies; Andrei Alén
- Developed by: Aku Louhimies; Andrei Alén; Helena Immonen; Jari Rantala
- Written by: Aku Louhimies; Andrei Alén; Helena Immonen; Jari Rantala
- Directed by: Aku Louhimies
- Creative director: Heather Loeffler
- Starring: Sara Soulié; Peter Franzén; Pirkka-Pekka Petelius; Julia Korpinen
- Music by: Lasse Enersen
- Country of origin: Finland
- Original languages: Finnish, English
- No. of series: 1
- No. of episodes: 6

Production
- Executive producers: Mikko Kodisoja; Petteri Koponen; Tommi Kangasmaa; Aram Tertzakian; Nick Spicer; Marci Wiseman
- Producers: Aku Louhimies; Andrei Alén
- Cinematography: Ants Martin Vahur
- Editors: Antony Bentley; Benjamin Mercer; Marion Koppel
- Production companies: Backmann & Hoderoff

Original release
- Network: MTV Katsomo
- Release: 30 November 2024 – present

Conflict (Finnish: Konflikti) is a Finnish TV miniseries with six-parts directed by Aku Louhimies. It began airing on 30 November 2024 on the MTV3 television channel and on the MTV Katsomo streaming service. In addition to Louhimies, the series was written by Andrei Alén, Jari Rantala and Helena Immonen. The series imagines a scenario where an unidentified enemy invades Hankoniemi during midsummer celebrations, and follows the resulting conflict through the lens of the country's leadership and among those who remain in Hanko on the occupied territory.

The first episode of the series reached more than a million people in its first week of presentation. The licensing rights of the series were sold to several European countries, including France, Poland, Spain and the Baltic states, and in Ukraine where, according to Louhimies, the series was licensed without compensation.

== Cast ==
=== Government ===
- Sara Soulié as President Linnea Saaristo, the newly elected head of state and Laavakuru's former protégé
- Pirkka-Pekka Petelius as Prime Minister Kai Laavakuru, the head of government and former Minister for Foreign Affairs. Before filming the series, Petelius had served as an MP in the Finnish Parliament, in the parliamentary lineup which brought Finland into NATO, though he had been absent from the vote to apply for membership.
- Jannika Niilerpalo as Noora, the President's police bodyguard
- Sandra Hagelstam as Mia Taanila, chief of staff to Prime Minister Laavakuru

=== Military ===
- Peter Franzén as Captain Rami Ohrankämmen, the commander of a conscript battalion and Afghanistan veteran
- Julia Korpinen as Officer Cadet Annika Berg, a conscript and trainee squad leader
- Akseli Kouki as Officer Cadet Kim Kontiainen, a conscript and Berg's boyfriend
- Charles Gibbons as Private Jeff Williams, a Finnish-American conscript in Berg's squad and grandson of the U.S. Speaker of the House Merrill Williams
- Salah Isse Mohamed as Private Youssuf Osman, a conscript in Berg's squad
- Elias Gould as Sergeant Samuli Haju, a conscript captured by the invaders
- Reetta Ylä-Rautio as Corporal Siiri Skog, a conscript captured by the invaders
- Aleksi Kaukamo as Private Juuso Jaakkola, a hot headed conscript
- Akseli Ilvesniemi as Undersergeant Matti Rannila, a conscript
- Salomon Z. Patrick as Private Ilmari Laine, a conscript
- Hector Björklund as Private Antti Suuros, a conscript
- Elias Keränen as Lieutenant Kiiskinen, Ohrankämmen's second in command
- Vincent Willestrand as Staff Sergeant Merinen, an NCO and Ohrankämmen's third in command
- Jukka Puotila as General Parviainen, the Chief of Defence
- Matti Ristinen as Lieutenant General Kuusela, Finnish Army Chief of Operations
- Mia Hafrén as Brigadier General Sandelin, Finnish Army Chief of Communications
- Samuli Vauramo as Captain Kraus, head of the Finnish Special Forces
- Leo Sjöman as Numminen, a Finnish Special Forces operator
- Heikki Slåen as Manner, a Finnish Special Forces operator
- Janne Vakio as Major Autio, an Army adjutant to President Saaristo
- Moe Dunford as Major Jack Brady, a liaison from the United States Army 101st Airborne Division
- Dylan Smith as Vice Admiral Tim Adler, a United States Navy NATO commander

=== Civilians ===
- Rory Fleck Byrne as Joshua Belfort, the American husband of Linnea Saaristo
- Nadia Forde as Claire Belfort, Joshua's sister trapped in Hanko
- Luke Sharland as Terrance Belfort, Claire's husband
- Arttu Kapulainen as Jusa Soranen, a resident of Hanko and former soldier who served with Ohrankämmen
- Alyona Osmanova as Amanda Soranen, Jusa's Ukrainian wife
- Larry Lamb as Sir Martin Wright, an influential British power broker nicknamed "Mr. Davos"

== Episodes ==
Series	Episodes	Originally released	
Series	Episodes	First released	Last released
1	6	30 November 2024	4 January 2025

=== Series 1 ===
No.	Title	Directed by	Written by	Original release date
1	"The Occupation"	Aku Louhimies	Jari Rantala	30 November 2024
The Midsummer celebrations of the newly elected president Linnea Saaristo are interrupted, the captain of the defense forces Rami Ohrankämmen and the young conscripts are caught by surprise when the enemy invades Finland.
2	"The Reaction"	Aku Louhimies	Jari Rantala; Andrei Alén	7 December 2024
The enemy's demands cause conflicts within the country's leadership. Annika Berg's conscript group struggles to survive. Information influencing and cyberwar begin.
3	"The Resistance"	Aku Louhimies	Jari Rantala; Andrei Alén	14 December 2024
President Linnea Saaristo sends special forces to the occupied territory and Prime Minister Kaj Laavakuru acts suspiciously. The enemy threat grows, but there is no way to retreat.
4	"The Betrayal"	Aku Louhimies	Jari Rantala; Aku Louhimies	21 December 2024
The special forces make unpleasant discoveries, and Captain Rami Ohrankämmen's own operation leads to danger. Prime Minister Kaj Laavakuru's suspicious activities come to an unexpected end.
5	"The Sacrifice"	Aku Louhimies	Andrei Alén; Aku Louhimies	28 December 2024
The escape of Annika Berg's conscript group is interrupted. As the conflict escalates, President Saaristo is forced to make a difficult decision.
6	"The Attack"	Aku Louhimies	Andrei Alén; Aku Louhimies	4 January 2025
Special forces continue the rescue operation and Defense Forces troops move into the occupied area. Under the leadership of Captain Rami Ohrankämmen, conscripts fight for freedom. The world is changing.

== Reception ==
Conflict was awarded at the Kultainen Venla gala in January 2025 for best drama series of the previous year and Aku Louhimies for best fiction director. Louhimies was also nominated for his script.

The series was met with mixed reception from critics and the public where both criticism and praise were given partly for the same things. Its veracity and relevance to the current events facts of harassment that took place in the Russian Baltic Sea at the same time provoked most discussion. However, Louhimies stated that he had cut many events that seemed too current from the script. The prominent role of the Finnish Defense Forces in the series was noted to increase its perceived frightening realism, although film critic Kalle Kinnunen saw the series as a useless and idle equipment presentation of the defense forces. Sports and cultural influencer Alpo Suhonen was likewise negative, considered the series "nauseating militarism, in rally English". On the one hand, the casting of female actors as key political decision-makers in Finland was praised, but on the other hand, the introduction of the two most important female characters through sex scenes at the beginning of the series was criticized.

== See also ==
- Zero Day Attack – Taiwanese television series with similar premise
