= Matriarch (film) =

- Directed by: Ben Steiner
- Written by: Ben Steiner
- Starring: Jemima Rooper; Kate Dickie
- Production company: 20th Digital Studio
- Distributed by: Hulu
- Release date: October 21, 2022
- Running time: 85 minutes
- Country: United States
- Language: English

Matriarch is a 2022 American horror film written and directed by Ben Steiner and starring Jemima Rooper and Kate Dickie.

== Synopsis ==
At breaking point after a near fatal overdose, a woman returns home to confront her childhood traumas, and her mother.

== Cast ==
- Jemima Rooper as Laura
- Kate Dickie as Celia
- Sarah Paul as Abi
- Simon Meacock as Leonard
- Nick Haverson as Gerald
- Celinde Schoenmaker as Katrin

== Release ==
The film was released on Hulu in the United States and on Disney+ in the United Kingdom on October 21, 2022.

== Reception ==
The film has an 85% rating on Rotten Tomatoes based on 13 reviews. Meagan Navarro of Bloody Disgusting awarded the film two and a half "skulls" out of five. Mary Beth McAndrews of Dread Central awarded the film three and a half stars out of five.

Ben Kenigsberg of The New York Times gave the film a negative review and wrote, "But none of how Matriarch resolves is particularly scary or surprising. The finale — filled with dark, barely legible imagery — is a letdown both visually and dramatically."

Noel Murray of the Los Angeles Times gave the film a positive review and wrote, "Steiner’s film shrewdly shifts back and forth between the real physical threat of dark supernatural forces and the more elusive harm done by a lifetime of bad parenting."

Martin Unnsworth of Starburst also gave the film a positive review, calling it "a slowly simmering powder keg of a film that mixes relatable human drama with a portion of Cronenberg mixed with a soupçon of The Devils."
