= Between the Sheets (TV series) =

- DVD cover
- Created by: Kay Mellor
- Starring: Alun Armstrong; Brenda Blethyn; Julie Graham; Richard Armitage; Gaynor Faye
- Country of origin: United Kingdom
- Original language: English
- No. of series: 1
- No. of episodes: 6

Original release
- Network: ITV
- Release: 17 November – 22 December 2003

Between the Sheets is a 2003 British television miniseries. This dramedy depicts the romantic and sexual challenges of several different couples who are all linked in some way.

== Plot ==
Hazel Delany walks out on her husband, owner of a stripclub, hours after their daughter's wedding; she's upset with him because he has had a string of affairs, and he is dismayed by her disinterest in sex (and exasperated that his mother has a better relationship with her boyfriend than he and his wife do). Hazel and Peter eventually go to a sex therapist to overcome their difficulties. Peter is hiding a secret about one of his ex-mistresses, and Hazel has a sexual awakening in the arms of a younger man.

Hazel and Peter's son, Simon, has left a long-term relationship. After the ex tells Hazel that she is pregnant, Hazel pushes him to reconcile with and marry his girlfriend, but he's reluctant to do so, because he has fallen for one of his father's nightclub hostesses.

Alona Cunningham works as a sex therapist yet finds her boyfriend, Paul, unenthusiastic in the bedroom. Paul works as a probation officer and reveals that he is being accused of having had sex with one of his 15-year-old clients. As Paul's alleged misconduct is being investigated, Alona catches her teenage son sleeping with the au pair, and through the stress of all this considers having an affair. The couple end up seeing one of Alona's colleagues for therapy.

== Cast ==
- Alun Armstrong as Peter Delany
- Brenda Blethyn as Hazel Delany
- Dean Andrews as Steve Ashby
- James Thornton as Simon Delany
- Gaynor Faye as Georgia Lovett
- Liz Smith as Audrey Delany
- Norman Wisdom as Maurice Hardy
- Julie Graham as Alona Cunningham
- Richard Armitage as Paul Andrews
- Vinette Robinson as Tracy Ellis

== Episodes ==
No.	Title	Directed by	Written by	Original release date	Viewers (millions)
1	"Episode 1"	Robin Shepperd	Kay Mellor	17 November 2003	7.87
2	"Episode 2"	Robin Shepperd	Kay Mellor	24 November 2003	6.91
3	"Episode 3"	Robin Shepperd	Kay Mellor	1 December 2003	7.01
4	"Episode 4"	Jane Prowse	Kay Mellor	8 December 2003	6.42
5	"Episode 5"	Jane Prowse	Kay Mellor	15 December 2003	6.68
6	"Episode 6"	Jane Prowse	Kay Mellor	22 December 2003	6.08
