= Heat (magazine) =

Entertainment magazine in the UK

- Heat cover from March 2020
- Editor: Thomas Fangar; Lucie Cave
- Categories: Entertainment
- Frequency: Weekly
- Publisher: Bauer Media Group
- Total circulation: 163,392 (June–December 2015)
- First issue: 1999
- Country: United Kingdom
- Based in: London
- Language: English
- Website: heatworld.com
- ISSN: 1465-6264

Heat is an English entertainment magazine published by Bauer Media Group. Its mix of celebrity news, gossip, beauty advice and fashion is primarily aimed at women, although not as directly as in other women's magazines. It also features movie and music reviews, TV listings and major celebrity interviews.

== History ==
Heat was launched in February 1999 as a general interest entertainment magazine, at a cost of more than £4m. However, unlike other Emap (now Bauer) magazine launches before and after, it was not an immediate success, with a circulation below 100,000. A series of revamps quickly repositioned the magazine as a less serious, more gossip-oriented magazine aimed at women, and circulation quickly grew. A series of high-profile celebrity relationships, such as Jennifer Aniston and Brad Pitt provided ample material, while reality shows such as Big Brother and Pop Idol grew popular at just the right time to help fill pages. Heat achieved record sale figures when Jade Goody had a make-over and was first on the front cover after her stint in Big Brother 3 (2002) and later when Nikki Grahame and Pete Bennett from Big Brother 7 split and Grahame was interviewed for Heat in 2006.

In 2009–10, Heat spearheaded a campaign alongside Girls Aloud's Nicola Roberts advocating the banning of sunbed use in the UK for under-18s. The campaign was a success and a bill was passed by Parliament shortly before the 2010 General Election.

=== Editors ===
- Barry McIlheney (1999–2000)
- Mark Frith (2000–08)
- Julian Linley (2008–09)
- Sam Delaney (2009–2010)
- Lucie Cave (2011–2012); Editor-in-Chief across the heat brand (2012-)
- Jeremy Mark (2012–15)
- Suzy Cox (2015-)

An edition of the magazine is also published in South Africa.

== Heatworld.com ==
Heatworld.com launched on 22 May 2007 and was edited by Julian Linley, who had been deputy editor of Heat magazine for five years. The site is an online interpretation of the magazine, emulating the mix of celebrity news, gossip and fashion. However, heatworld.com does not replicate magazine content and bases itself more on video and audio content and breaking news. The site is advertising funded.

== Heat Radio ==
On 25 September 2007, Heat Radio was launched. The station is owned by Bauer Radio, a division of the company, Bauer, which owns Heat magazine. The station can be listened to across the UK on DAB Digital Radio, on their app or at heatradio.com.

== Television channel ==
On 3 July 2012, Heat launched, featuring celebrity news and music. The channel comes from Box Television, a joint venture between Bauer and Channel Four. It replaced Q on Sky, Smallworld Cable and Virgin Media in the UK, in Ireland on Sky and UPC Ireland and in Iceland on Síminn.

In May 2016, the channel was rebranded as Box Upfront.

== Heat merchandise ==
As Heat magazine grew in popularity, spin off merchandise was released to cash in on its success. Current items carrying the Heat brand name are an exercise DVD titled Heat: Get That Celeb Look which was released in 2003, an interactive DVD game featuring celebrity questions, an annual for the year 2007 and in 2003 a set of mini books titled Say What were released containing quotes from celebrities such as Gareth Gates.

== Controversy ==
In an issue which was released on 27 November 2007, Heat used a photograph of Katie Price's disabled son, who has septo-optic dysplasia, a rare condition which means he is visually impaired and has hormonal deficiencies, causing him to easily gain weight and means he is partially blind, on a sticker which was included with the magazine, with the slogan "Harvey wants to eat me!" The magazine's editor Mark Frith made an apology for the offence caused by the sticker, and an apology was also posted on the magazine's website. A spokesperson for the Press Complaints Commission confirmed that Katie Price was planning to make a complaint about the matter. The magazine was also criticized in the press over the incident, with one editorial describing it as "the lowest point in British journalism".

In another issue released on 6–12 September 2014, Heat published a photograph of Justin Timberlake, husband to Jessica Biel, at a nightclub in Paris on the night after his performance. The star was photographed partying with women at the club as the title named it "Justin Timberlake gets flirty with another woman – That's not his wife!" Once the article, as well as the pictures surfaced it caused his marriage with Jessica to be manipulated. The singer and actor lodged a defamation claim in the courts in Ireland against the publishers of the celebrity title over an article, photographs and quotes attributed to Biel. In the agreed statement read in the high court, a lawyer for the Heat publisher Bauer group admitted the article headlined "The flirty photos that rocked Justin and Jessica's marriage" was based on an unfounded report. The article also included purported statements improperly attributed to Biel which the publishers said Heat now understands the actor never made. The Bauer media group later apologized on Heat magazine's behalf over these allegations, and a settlement was made in a hearing before the president of the High Court, Mr Justice Nicholas Kearns.

== Heat's Twitter Awards ==
Heat launched heat's Twitter Awards in 2013 that it says will celebrate “the joyful collision of celebrities and social media”. Heat promoted its celebrity Twitter awards via Heat's TV, radio, magazine and social media platforms as well as a marketing campaign, which will include press, radio, digital, PR and retail activity.

Specially created videos for each category were released as the campaign progressed and designed to bring each category to life. The winners were announced via Heatworld.com and also its YouTube Channel.

== Heat's Weird crush poll ==
Between 2006 and 2021, every year (except for 2012), Heat opened a poll to find the nation's oddest celebrity crush. The winners of each year were:

- 2006: Richard Hammond (Top Gear co-host)
- 2007: James May (Top Gear co-host)
- 2008: Jeremy Clarkson (Top Gear co-host)
- 2009: Derren Brown (mind magician)
- 2010: Karl Pilkington (An Idiot Abroad star)
- 2011: Richard Osman (Pointless co-host)
- 2013: Russell Howard (comedian)
- 2014: Matt Richardson (comedian)
- 2015: Jake Wood (EastEnders actor)
- 2016: Jake Wood
- 2017: Jake Wood
- 2018: Jake Wood
- 2019: Piers Morgan (journalist and television personality)
- 2020: Piers Morgan
- 2021: Perri Kiely (radio presenter for KISS Breakfast)

== Heat's Unmissables Awards ==
Heat annually crowns the greatest achievements in pop culture, from films and TV to books and podcasts in its annual Unmissables Awards. The readers vote in the key category of Best TV Soap.

=== Categories ===
- TV Comedy of the Year
- TV Drama of the Year
- Actor of the Year
- Actress of the Year
- TV & Radio Presenter of the Year
- Reality TV Show of the Year
- TV Entertainment Show of the Year
- Book of the Year
- Soap of the Year
- Comedian of the Year
- Podcast of the Year
- TV Binge of the Year
- TV Moment of the Year
- Film of the Year
- Album of the Year
