= MTV Katsomo =

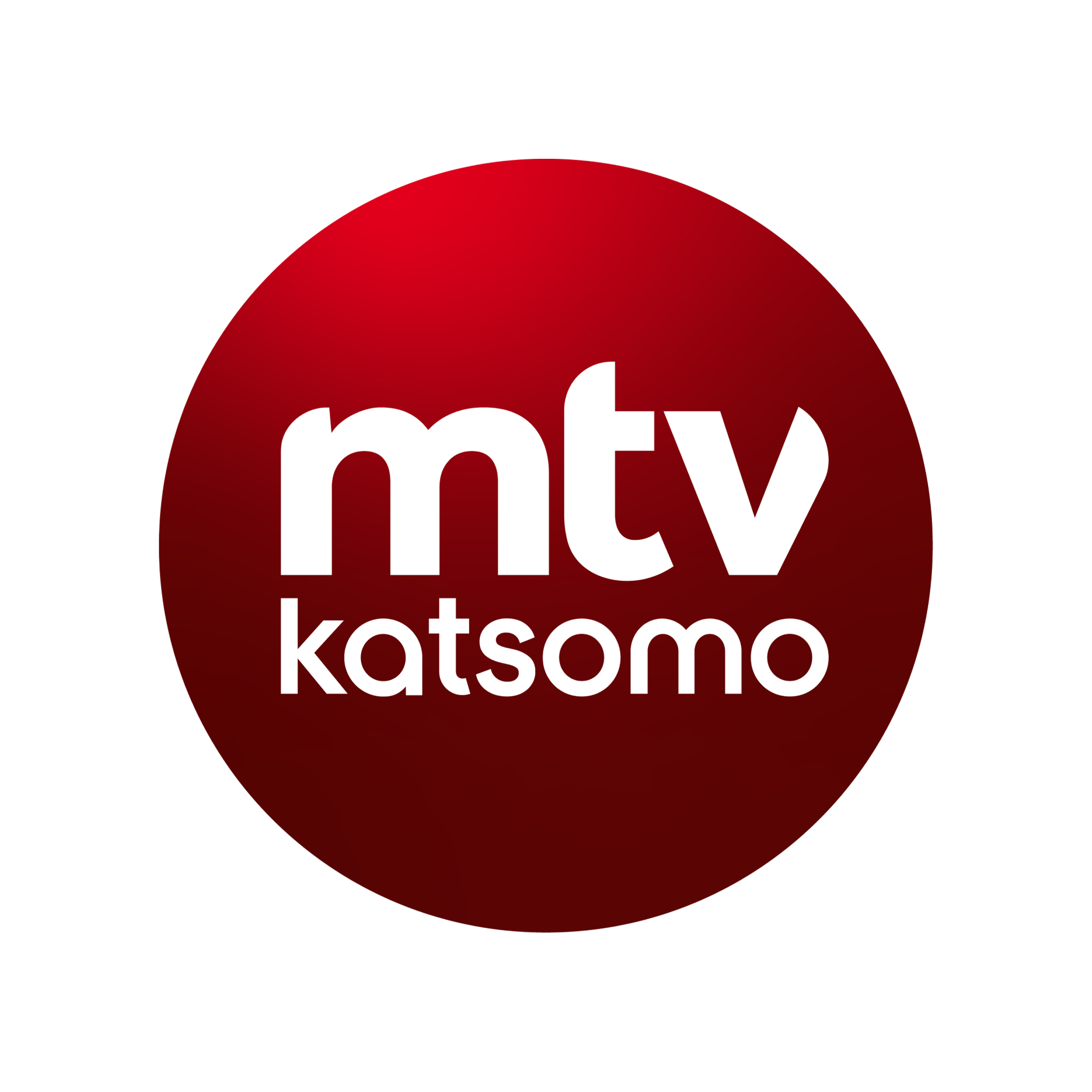
- Website type: OTT streaming platform
- Available in: Finnish
- Headquarters: Helsinki, Finland
- Country of origin: Finland
- Owner: MTV Oy
- Website: www.mtv.fi
- Commercial: Yes
- Registration: Required
- Launched: 2 March 2009; 17 years ago
- Current status: Active

MTV Katsomo (formerly mtv, Katsomo and MTV3 Katsomo) is a joint streaming service of free channels founded by MTV in 2009. The predecessor of the service was called MTV3 anytime, previously MTV3 netti-TV.

The service allows users to watch some of the programs shown on the channel afterwards or at the time of their presentation. Until 2017, it was also possible to watch paid programs on MTV Katsomo, such as advance screenings of television series and various live and sports events. In February 2017, paid content moved to the new C More streaming service. In April 2018, the streaming channels moved from Katsomo to C More.

In November 2018, MTV Katsomo was renamed mtv and the address mtv.fi. The former mtv.fi (in the years 1995–2013 mtv3.fi) changed to mtvuutiset.fi.

In May 2022, MTV returned the name of the service to its previous form, MTV Katsomo. At the same time, the logo and appearance of the service changed.

On October 10, 2023, C More became part of MTV Katsomo. Users can watch MTV Katsomo for free, but to watch most of the content they have to buy an MTV Katsomo+ subscription.

== MTV original series ==
- Estonia
- Conflict
- Linda
- Roba
- Salatut elämät
