= The Quiet Ones (2014 film) =

2014 British horror film by John Pogue

- Theatrical release poster
- Directed by: John Pogue
- Screenplay by: John Pogue; Craig Rosenberg; Oren Moverman
- Story by: Tom de Ville
- Produced by: Ben Holden; James Gay-Rees; Simon Oakes; Steven Chester Prince; Tobin Armbrust
- Starring: Jared Harris; Sam Claflin; Erin Richards; Rory Fleck Byrne; Olivia Cooke
- Cinematography: Mátyás Erdély
- Edited by: Glenn Garland
- Music by: Lucas Vidal
- Production company: Hammer Film Productions
- Distributed by: Lionsgate
- Release date: 10 April 2014
- Running time: 98 minutes
- Country: United Kingdom
- Language: English
- Budget: $200,000
- Box office: $17.8 million

The Quiet Ones is a 2014 British supernatural horror film directed by John Pogue, loosely based on the Philip experiment, a 1972 parapsychology experiment conducted in Toronto. It stars Jared Harris as a university professor attempting to prove poltergeists are manifestations of the human psyche and not supernatural beings. The film was released on 10 April 2014 in the United Kingdom and 25 April 2014 in the United States.

== Plot ==
In 1974, a student attends the class of Oxford University’s Professor Joseph Coupland, who wishes to prove that the supernatural does not exist. Coupland shows a video of a possessed boy and explains that research will be done to find a cure for this kind of disorder. One of his students, Brian McNeil, is invited to film the experiment process and joins Coupland, his two assistants Krissi Dalton and Harry Abrams, and their subject Jane Harper, a young woman who generates strange phenomena and has been abandoned. Jane is generally kept locked in a room with loud rock music playing during the daytime to prevent her from sleeping in the hopes that the regimen of sleep deprivation will result in increased activity.

Once his funding is taken away by an exasperated College Board that is both annoyed about the disturbances he makes and his lack of results, Coupland and his assistants settle in an isolated house in the countryside to keep experimenting on Jane. Her negative energy takes the form of "Evey", an infant doll-like creature that only Jane sees. Coupland instructs Jane to transfer her negative energy into a physical doll so they can destroy it. The further the researchers drive Jane to insanity with their methods, the stranger things get around the house. Brian is upset by the way Jane is treated and the lack of ethics in the experiment. Evey's apparitions become increasingly aggressive, and Jane begins to harm herself. There are also indicators that any attempt to harm Evey harms Jane.

Coupland refuses to stop the inhumane experimentation. He is irrevocably convinced that "Evey" is merely a conventionally treatable, psychological disorder in Jane's head, but the others become convinced over time that Evey is a real, malevolent, supernatural force. Brian and Jane become closer and share a kiss. When the group experience another attack by Evey, Brian goes to Oxford, where he discovers that a symbol that was marked into Jane is from a cult who worshiped a Sumerian demon. They performed experiments on a young girl a few years ago; their leader believed that Evey Dwyer, a girl with clairvoyant abilities, was the one to bring their "idol" into the physical world. Everybody in the cult died in a house fire that Evey set, including Evey herself. Brian returns and tells them about the cult, certain that Evey is a demonic presence who is possessing Jane. He convinces Harry and Krissi, but Coupland denies his theory and responds that Evey must be a figment from Jane's past rather than a demonic force.

Later that night, the group learns that the boy from the earlier experiments footage was Coupland's own son. After a heated argument, they are all marked with the same symbol Jane has. An unknown force murders Krissi and Harry. Jane realizes that she was the little girl that supposedly died in the house fire; she was born with clairvoyant powers and had set the house on fire to kill everyone. The authorities changed her name to Jane to give her a normal life, which is why negative energy is manifesting; Evey is not a demon, she is Jane's real identity (one who can't escape the trauma of her past life). Evey then attacks Brian, only for them both to be knocked out by Coupland. When Brian wakes up, he sees Coupland give Jane a lethal injection, as he thinks stopping her heart long enough for the negative energy to dissipate will permanently cure her. However, before Coupland can prove his theory, Brian subdues Coupland and brings Jane back to life. Once revived, Jane locks him out of the room and commits suicide by setting herself on fire.

The screen cuts to film footage, apparently from several months later, showing Brian sitting in a chair and holding a camera. An unseen speaker asks him about the deaths, to which Brian replies that everything was captured on film. The speaker replies that there is nothing on the film, and that everything in the house, including the films, were destroyed by the fire. When the speaker asks if Brian is responsible, Brian laughs maniacally and his hand starts to smoke, just as Jane's did.

== Cast ==
- Jared Harris as Professor Joseph Coupland
- Sam Claflin as Brian McNeil
- Olivia Cooke as Jane Harper/Evey Dwyer
- Erin Richards as Kristina 'Krissi' Dalton
- Rory Fleck Byrne as Harry Abrams
- Laurie Calvert as Phillip
- Max Pirkis as David Q
- Tracy Ray as David Q's Mother
- Richard Cunningham as Provost

In addition, Daisy Ridley appears in a still mock photograph (meant to represent the 'real' people the movie is based on) during the film's end credits as Jane Harper.

== Production ==
In June 2008, it was reported that the recently revived Hammer Film Productions would begin production on The Quiet Ones inspired by the allegedly true story of Canadian scientists in the 1970s who attempted to create a ghost. The original script by Tom de Ville was previously featured on the 2007 "Brit List", the United Kingdom equivalent of Hollywood's annual The Black List of the best unproduced screenplays.

Hammer began principal photography of the film on 12 June 2012 in England. Filming started in July in Oxfordshire. The film's director is John Pogue and it was first written by Tom DeVille and then revised by Craig Rosenberg, Oren Moverman, and Pogue. Ben Holden and James Gay-Rees produced the film, while Glenn Garland was the editor and Matyas Erdely was the cinematographer. Camille Brenda was the costume designer of the film.

Principal photography began on 12 June 2012 by Hammer Film Productions. Later in July filming began in Oxfordshire and Hertfordshire. Filming took place at Merton College and the Bodleian Library in Oxford. Hammer Films wrapped the filming on 16 July 2012.

== Release ==
Lionsgate Films acquired the rights to distribute the film in the United Kingdom and United States. It released the film on 11 April 2014 in the UK and 25 April in the US. It was released on DVD and Blu-ray on 19 August 2014.

== Reception ==
=== Box office ===
The film grossed $3,880,053 in its opening weekend. The film grossed $8,509,867 in the US and $9,325,000 internationally; the worldwide total is $17,834,867.

=== Critical reception ===
The film holds a rating of 37% on Rotten Tomatoes based on 83 reviews, with an average rating of 4.8/10. The website's critical consensus states: "While it definitely sports a few palpable scares, The Quiet Ones finds Hammer Films trading too heavily on old glories." The film has a 41/100 on Metacritic based on 24 reviews. Audiences polled by CinemaScore gave the film an average grade of "C+" on an A+ to F scale.
