= Lucie Cave =

British journalist and television presenter

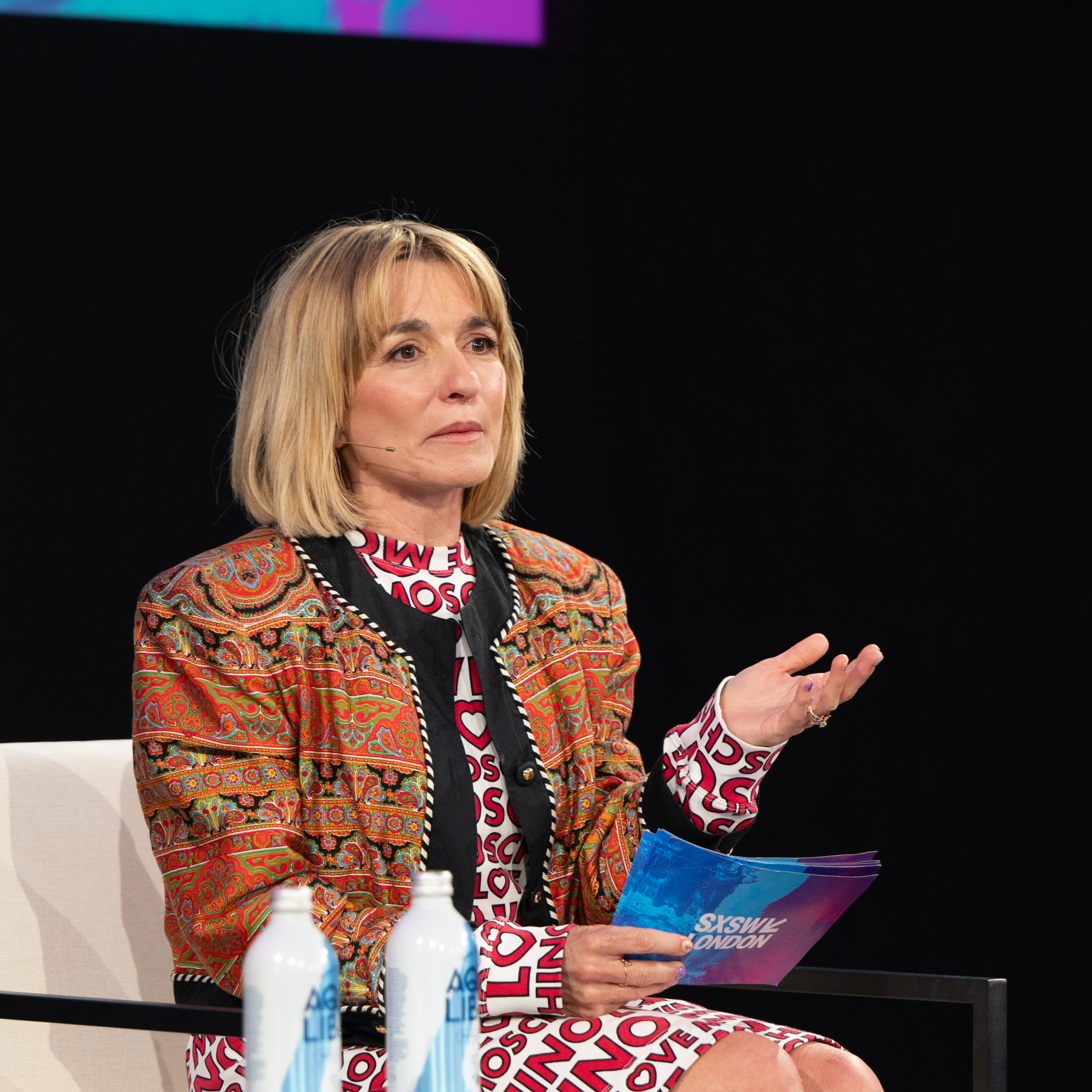
- Cave in 2026
- Occupation: Journalist
- Known for: Interviewer and journalist in Heat

Lucie Cave (born 1974) is an English journalist who is the Editor-in-Chief of Heat magazine and the Heat brand (spanning heat radio, heatworld.com and heat TV). She graduated with a 2:1 in English Literature from the University of Sheffield in 1995, where she was the editor of the University newspaper Darts. Her career started with Trouble TV.

== Publications ==
On 25 May 2014, Hodder published Joey Essex's number one selling ghost-written autobiography called Joey Essex: Being Reem, written by and dedicated to Lucie Cave. On 2 May 2006, she also ghost-wrote the HarperCollins published Jade Goody's autobiography titled Jade: My Autobiography, dedicated to Cave. She also wrote Abi Titmuss' book – released in spring 2008.

== Broadcasting ==
Cave has appeared on numerous TV shows as a presenter and media pundit. Including 'E! live from the red carpet', and the National Television Awards and the TV Baftas. She also hosts two weekend shows on Heat radio and was a relief presenter on breakfast station GMTV for their Talking Telly segment. She was a regular guest on Ray D'Arcy's breakfast show, on Irish radio station Today FM. She also presents some shows on the channel Heat. She hosts segments and shows on 4Music and presents Weekend on Saturdays with Aled Jones.

On 11 January 2023, Bauer Media Audio UK appointed Cave to the newly created role of Chief Creative Officer for Podcasts and Commercial Content.

== Personal life ==
In September 2014, she married Ben Lunt at Babington House, Somerset.
