= Philip experiment =

1972 parapsychology experiment in Toronto

The Philip experiment was a 1972 parapsychology experiment conducted in Toronto, Ontario to determine whether subjects can communicate with fictionalized ghosts through expectations of human will.

== Experiment ==
The experiment was conducted by a Toronto parapsychological research society led by mathematical geneticist Dr. A.R. George Owen and overseen by psychologist Dr. Joel Whitton. The test group consisted of Owen's wife Iris Owen, former chairperson of MENSA in Canada Margaret Sparrow, industrial designer Lorne Henwood, his wife Andy (Andienne), heating engineer Al Peacock, accountant Bernice M., bookkeeper Dorothy O’Donnel, and sociology student Sidney K.

Their goals were to create a fictional character through a purposeful methodology and then "attempt" to communicate with it through séance. The character created and agreed upon was named "Philip Aylesford", referred to as Philip during the test. His fictional history partially coincided with actual events and places, but with multiple contradictions and errors. He was born in 1624 in England, had an early military career and was knighted by the age of sixteen. He was involved in the English Civil War and became personal friends with Charles II, working for him as a spy. Philip was unhappily married to a woman named Dorothea and later fell in love with a Romani girl who was accused of witchcraft and burned at the stake. In despair, Philip committed suicide in 1654 at the age of thirty.

The group was seated around a table with initial séances yielding no contact, no communication, and no phenomenon. Owen changed test conditions by dimming lights and changing the environment to mimic that of a more “traditional” séance. Participants began feeling a presence, table vibrations, breezes, unexplained echoes, and rapping sounds which matched responses to questions about Philip's life. At one point the table tilted on a single leg, and at other times moved across the room without human contact. Although audio, video, and witness accounts document the paranormal phenomena, Philip never appeared to the participants.

== Criticism ==
The experiment has been criticized for lacking solid controls and providing ambiguous results due to the unreliability of séances. Repeated tests, which created fictional characters named "Lilith" and "Humphrey", yielded similar results under similar circumstances and were deemed inconclusive.

== In popular culture ==
The experiment loosely inspired the horror films The Apparition, released in 2012, and The Quiet Ones, released in 2014.

== See also ==
- Global Consciousness Project
