= The Inheritance (TV series) =

- Genre: Drama
- Written by: Aschlin Ditta
- Directed by: Aku Louhimies
- Starring: Robert James-Collier; Gaynor Faye; Jemima Rooper; Larry Lamb; Samantha Bond; Adil Ray; Kevin Whately
- Country of origin: United Kingdom
- Original language: English
- No. of series: 1
- No. of episodes: 4

Production
- Running time: 43 minutes
- Production companies: Peer Pressure; Lonesome Pine Productions; Eccho Rights

Original release
- Network: Channel 5
- Release: 4 September – 25 September 2023

The Inheritance is a four-part British drama television series, first broadcast in the UK on Channel 5 on 4 September 2023.

== Plot ==
When father-of-three Dennis (Larry Lamb) dies unexpectedly, his adult children are left bereft. However, their grief is quickly overshadowed by anger, confusion and suspicion when they learn that he recently changed his will and they will not be receiving any part of his estate.

== Cast ==
- Robert James-Collier as Daniel
- Gaynor Faye as Sian
- Jemima Rooper as Chloe
- Larry Lamb as Dennis
- Samantha Bond as Susan
- Adil Ray as Pete
- Kevin Whately as Michael
- Rory Fleck Byrne as Nathan
- Pauline McLynn as Jenny Roche
- Risteard Cooper as DS Morris

== Production ==
The series was filmed in County Kilkenny, Ireland. The outside of the funeral home belongs to 5th-generation funeral directors D. Chisholm and Sons, which was founded in 1878 and is located on Huntly Street, Inverness, Scotland. The funeral home is the former Queen Street Church, which was converted to become the current funeral home.

== Reception ==
Ed Power, reviewing for i, rated the series 4 stars out of 5. According to BARB 7-day data, the first episode premiered with 3.39m viewers.

== Episodes ==
No. overall	No. in series	Title	Directed by	Written by	Original release date	UK viewers (millions)
1	1	"Episode One"	Aku Louhimies	Aschlin Ditta	4 September 2023	3.39
2	2	"Episode Two"	Aku Louhimies	Aschlin Ditta	11 September 2023	3.40
3	3	"Episode Three"	Aku Louhimies	Aschlin Ditta	18 September 2023	3.10
4	4	"Episode Four"	Aku Louhimies	Aschlin Ditta	25 September 2023	3.42
