= Sandra Hagelstam =

Finnish fashion blogger, influencer and entrepreneur

Sandra Hagelstam (born 1987 in Sipoo) is a Finnish Swedish language-speaking blogger, influencer, fashion designer, and entrepreneur living in London and Helsinki. Her family are owners of Fazer Group.

== Life and career ==
In the early 2010s, during her studies at London College of Fashion, Hagelstam rose to some prominence as a popular fashion blogger in the UK. Her website goes under the name 5 inch and up, referring to her height and high-heeled shoes. At the peak of its popularity, the blog had half a million monthly readers.

Hagelstam's work in fashion design includes commissions from brands such as Nelly.com and River Island.

In early 2020, Hagelstam shut down her blog, subsequently relaunching her site as an online store specializing in designer shoes. She asserts that high-heeled shoes are a niche currently underserved by media and online communities, in contrast to e.g. the online culture surrounding sneakers marketed to men.

In addition to her work in the fashion industry, Hagelstam has appeared in Verta, hikeä ja T-Paito (2020, Finnish for 'Blood, sweat and T-shirts') a Finnish documentary series produced by Yle, which discusses ethical issues prevalent in the clothing industry. In 2019, Hagelstam made her acting debut in the British film After Louise.
