= Robert James-Collier =

English actor (born 1976)

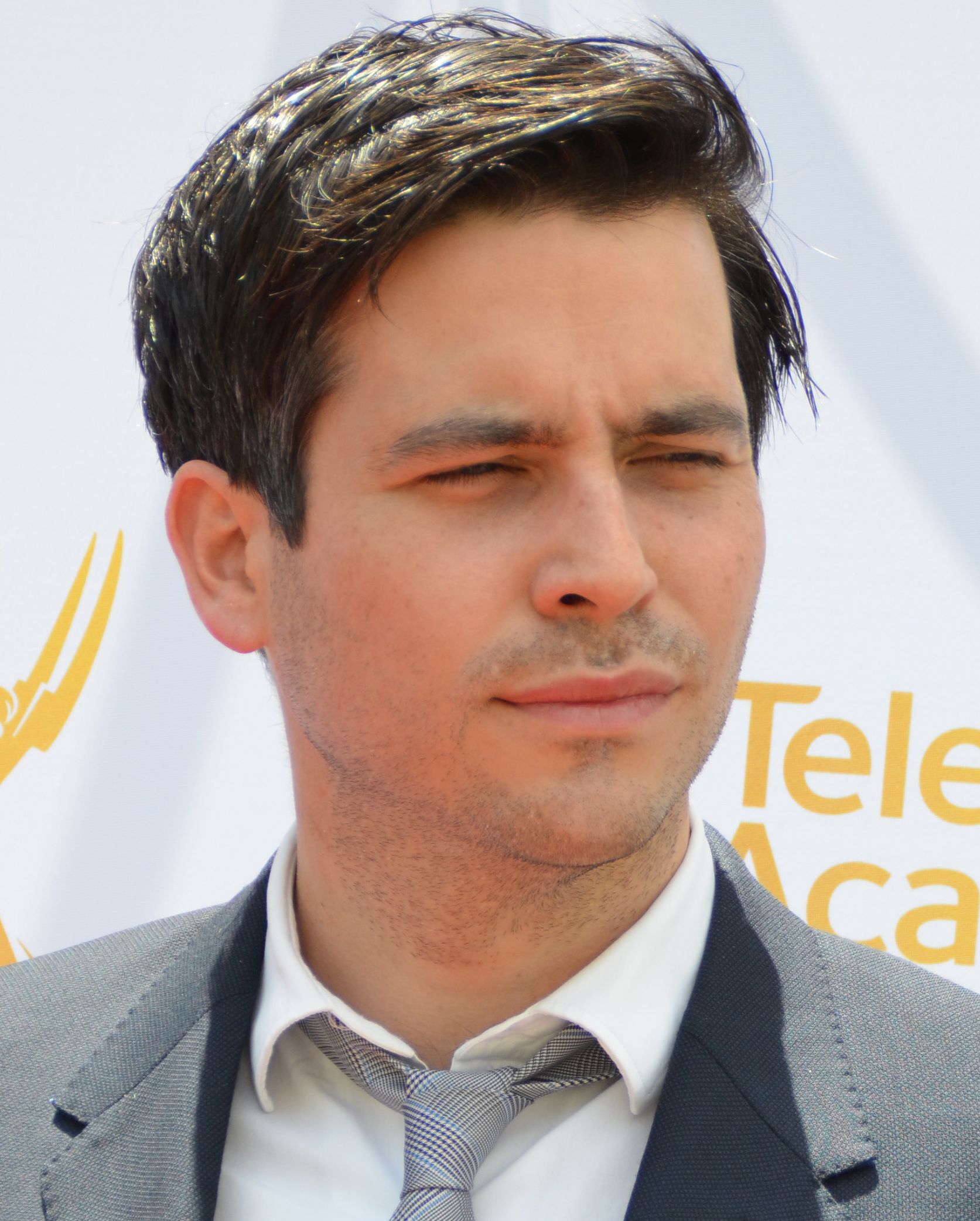
- James-Collier in May 2014
- Born: Robert James Collier; 23 September 1976 (age 49); Salford, Greater Manchester, England
- Other names: Rob James-Collier, Robert James Collier
- Occupation: Actor
- Years active: 2005–present
- Children: 1

Robert James-Collier (born 23 September 1976) is a British actor widely known for his roles as Liam Connor in Coronation Street, Thomas Barrow in Downton Abbey, and Martin Evershed in Ackley Bridge.

== Early life and education ==
James-Collier was born on 23 September 1976 in Salford, Greater Manchester, to parents James and Anne Collier as Robert James Collier. When he became an actor, he hyphenated his middle name and surname to form a new surname, to comply with the rules of Equity and avoid confusion with another actor named Robert Collier.

James-Collier was educated at St Patrick's Roman Catholic High School in Eccles, Greater Manchester. He studied business at the University of Huddersfield for his bachelor's degree, and later obtained a master's degree in marketing at the University of Manchester Institute of Science and Technology.

== Career ==
With no acting experience, James-Collier auditioned for the series Down to Earth. Stars Ricky Tomlinson and Denise Welch were convinced by his talent, and he got the part of the womanising pub landlord. In 2006, he appeared in New Street Law and played a small part as 'Stud' in Shameless series 3, episode 5 under the name of Rob Collier.

In 2006 he joined Coronation Street as Liam Connor, joint owner of the Underworld factory. He left the show in October 2008. In an interview in early 2008, he announced he would leave the soap but planned to return. However, in June 2008, it was reported that the character of Liam was set to be 'brutally' killed off as part of a murder-mystery plotline where three well-known residents fell under suspicion for the crime. He soon modelled for British catalogue retailer Argos, appearing in the Autumn/Winter 2007 and Spring/Summer 2008 catalogues.

James-Collier achieved international recognition as the scheming, lonely gay footman (and later under-butler) Thomas Barrow in the historical drama series Downton Abbey (2010–2015), subsequently appearing in the franchise's three feature films, Downton Abbey (2019), Downton Abbey: A New Era (2022) and Downton Abbey: The Grand Finale (2025).

He played Kevin O'Dowd in ITV's 2016 crime drama The Level. In 2017, he starred in British horror film The Ritual; The Guardian described his performance as "a fierce screen presence". He had a principal role in the "Cold River" episode of Vera, aired in 2018.

In 2019 it was announced that he would be cast in the third series of Channel 4 school-drama Ackley Bridge as Martin Evershed.

In September 2023 James-Collier starred in the Channel 5 drama series The Inheritance, appearing alongside Samantha Bond, Jemima Rooper, Gaynor Faye and Adil Ray.

In 2025 James-Collier starred as DC Ben Cooper in the series Cooper & Fry; the series, also starring Mandip Gill, aired on Channel 5 in November 2025.

== Awards ==
For his role as Liam Connor on Coronation Street, James-Collier won "Best Newcomer" and "Sexiest Male" at the 2007 Inside Soap Awards. James-Collier won the Sexiest Male award at the 2007 and 2008 British Soap Awards in addition to "Best Exit" at the 2009 British Soap Awards.

== Personal life ==
James-Collier married Lauren Chandiram, who ran a fashion boutique before James-Collier's rise to fame. They made their relationship public on the red carpet in 2007. They have one son.

== Filmography ==
Film
| Year | Title | Role | Notes |
|---|---|---|---|
| 2011 | Mercenaries | Callum | |
| 2012 | Spike Island | Mr Milligan | |
| 2013 | Wayland's Song | John | |
| 2015 | A Christmas Star | Pat McKerrod | |
| 2016 | The Attendant | Alex | Short film |
| 2017 | The Ritual | Hutch | |
| 2019 | Nancy | Nancy's father | Short film |
| 2019 | Downton Abbey | Thomas Barrow | |
| 2022 | Downton Abbey: A New Era | Thomas Barrow | |
| 2025 | Downton Abbey: The Grand Finale | Thomas Barrow | |

Television
| Year | Title | Role | Notes |
|---|---|---|---|
| 2005 | Perfect Day | Alex | Television film |
| 2005 | Down to Earth | Nicky Christy | 10 episodes |
| 2006 | Shameless | Stud/Jim | Episode #3.5 |
| 2006 | Casualty | Martin Stonewall | Episode: "Secrets and Lies" |
| 2006 | Dalziel and Pascoe | Simon Thewlis | Episode 1: "The Cave Woman"; Credited as "Rob Collier" |
| 2006–2008 | Coronation Street | Liam Connor | 330 episodes; Won – Best Exit – British Soap Awards; Won – Sexiest Male (2008) – Inside Soap Awards; Won – Sexiest Male (2007) – Inside Soap Awards |
| 2010–2015 | Downton Abbey | Thomas Barrow | 52 episodes; Won – Screen Actors Guild Award for Outstanding Performance by an Ensemble in a Drama Series (2012–14) |
| 2011 | Moving On | Clive | Episode: "The Milkman" |
| 2012 | Love Life | Joe | Main role |
| 2013 | Moving On | Aiden Evans | Episode: "Visiting Order" |
| 2016 | The Level | Kevin O'Dowd | 6 episodes |
| 2018 | Urban Myths | Colonel Archie Christie | Episode: "Agatha Christie" |
| 2019 | Vera | Richard | Episode: "Cold River" |
| 2019 | Death in Paradise | Oliver Carr | Episode: "Murder on the Honore Express" |
| 2019–2022 | Ackley Bridge | Martin Evershed | Main role |
| 2021–2022 | Fate: The Winx Saga | Saul Silva | 14 episodes |
| 2023 | The Inheritance | Daniel | 4 episodes; Channel 5 drama series |
| 2023 | The Long Shadow | DCS Jack Ridgeway | Episodes 4 and 5 |
| 2024 | Generation Z | Michael | 6 episodes |
| 2025 | Cooper and Fry | Ben Cooper | Main role |
