= Samantha Bond =

British actress (born 1961)

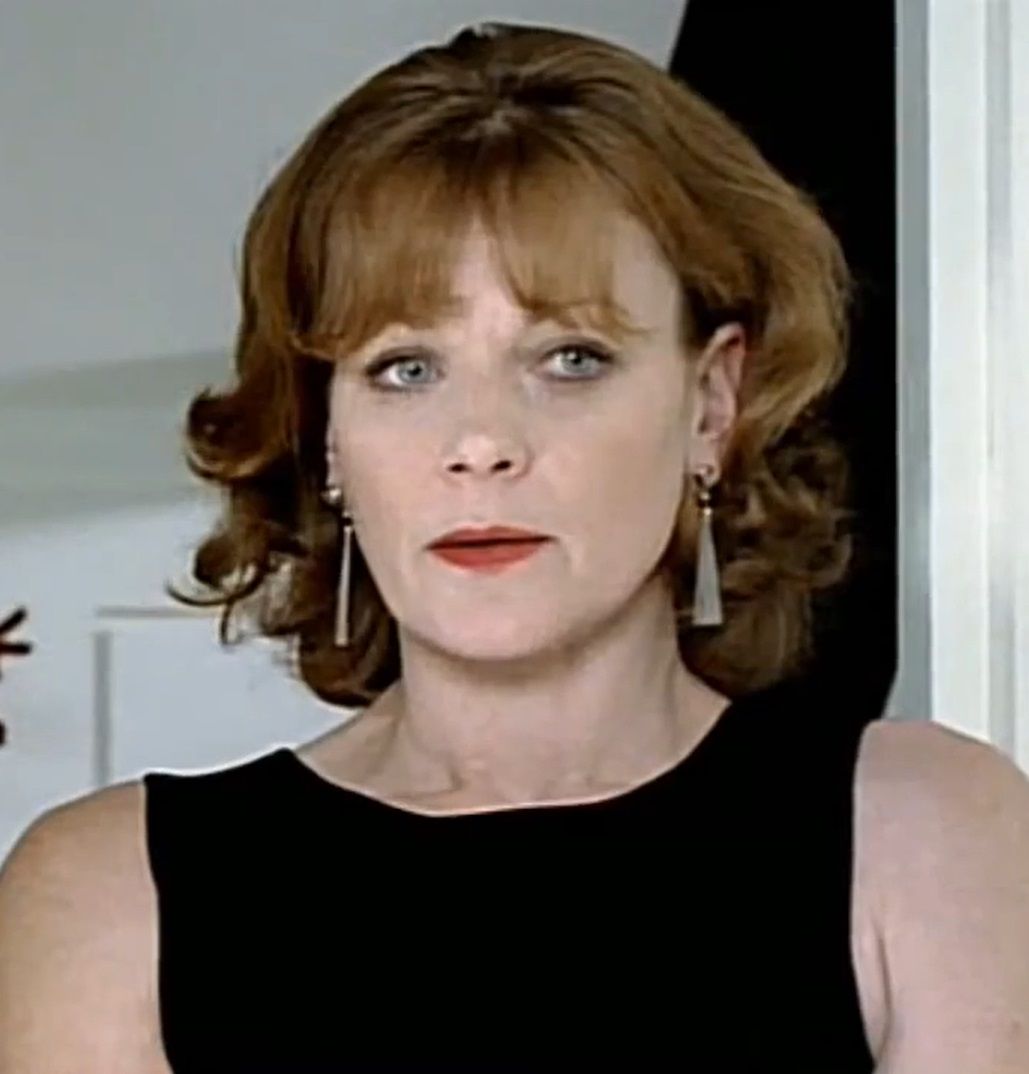
- Bond in The Murder Room, 2004
- Born: Samantha Jane Bond; 27 November 1961 (age 64); Kensington, London, England
- Occupation: Actress
- Years active: 1983–present
- Known for: James Bond; Blinded
- Television: Outnumbered; The Sarah Jane Adventures; Downton Abbey; Home Fires; The Bill
- Spouse: Alexander Hanson (m. 1989)
- Children: 2

Samantha Jane Bond (born 27 November 1961) is an English actress. She played Miss Moneypenny in four James Bond films during the Pierce Brosnan era, and appeared in Downton Abbey as the wealthy widow Lady Rosamund Painswick, sister of Robert Crawley, the Earl of Grantham. On television, she played "Auntie Angela" in the sitcom Outnumbered and the villain Mrs Wormwood in the CBBC Doctor Who spin-off, The Sarah Jane Adventures. She also originated the role of "Miz Liz" Probert in the Rumpole of the Bailey series. She is a member of the Royal Shakespeare Company.

== Early life ==
Bond is the daughter of actor Philip Bond and television producer Pat Sandys, and is the sister of the actress Abigail Bond and the journalist Matthew Bond. Bond's paternal grandparents were Welsh. She was brought up in London and Richmond-upon-Thames, in homes in Barnes and St Margarets. She attended the Godolphin and Latymer School, and studied acting at the Bristol Old Vic Theatre School.

== Career ==
=== Early career ===
Bond's first acting role came as a student at age 21, in the original stage production of Daisy Pulls It Off, Denise Deegan's play about a girls school, which opened at Southampton's Nuffield Theatre in 1983. Her earliest television roles took place the same year: she played Maria Rushworth (née Bertram) in the BBC mini-series adaptation of Jane Austen's Mansfield Park, and Rumpole's pupil in chambers "Miz Liz" Probert in the fourth series of Rumpole of the Bailey. In 1985, she appeared as Julia Simmons in the BBC's televised adaptation of Agatha Christie's crime novel A Murder Is Announced, part of the Miss Marple series.

=== Theatre ===
Bond's work with the Royal Shakespeare Company (the RSC) began in 1987, when she performed in three of the company's stage productions: Les Liaisons Dangereuses, Hero and Leander, and Lorca's Women. In 1992, the RSC cast her as Rosalind in Shakespeare's As You Like It, which she performed in their Stratford-upon-Avon and London theatres, and as Hermione in The Winter's Tale, also at the company's two theatres. She then toured with the RSC as Hermione in 1993.

Bond starred as the titular Amy in the Royal National Theatre's West End production of David Hare's play Amy's View, opposite Judi Dench, in 1997 and into early 1998. Later in 1998, she co-starred in playwright Shelagh Stephenson's The Memory of Water, also in the West End.

In 1999, Bond and Dench reprised their roles in Amy's View on Broadway for a limited run at the Ethel Barrymore Theatre. Their performances garnered Bond a Tony nomination for Best Featured Actress in a Play, and Dench the Tony Award for Best Leading Actress in a Play. Hare received a special citation from the New York Drama Critics' Circle.

Bond revisited The Memory of Water, making her directorial debut on a short touring production of the play in 2000, the same year it won an Olivier award for Best New Comedy. She also performed in numerous stage productions during the 2000s, among them: Shakespeare's A Midsummer Night's Dream in 2001, as Hippolyta and Titania, again for the RSC; Donald Margulies's Pulitzer prize-winning Dinner with Friends, as Karen, opposite her Downton Abbey co-star Elizabeth McGovern and directed by McGovern's husband Simon Curtis, in 2001; The Vagina Monologues in 2002; and in Shakespeare's Macbeth, as Lady Macbeth opposite Sean Bean in the title role, on tour in 2002 and 2003.

Other stage performances include Oscar Wilde's A Woman of No Importance in 2003; The Rubenstein Kiss in 2005; Michael Frayn's Donkey's Years at London's Comedy Theatre in 2006; and David Leveaux's West End revival of Tom Stoppard's Arcadia at the Duke of York's Theatre, in 2009 as Hannah, alongside another Downton Abbey co-star, Dan Stevens.

The next decade brought Bond onstage in Oscar Wilde's An Ideal Husband, as Mrs. Cheveley opposite her real-life actor husband Alexander Hanson as Mr. Cheveley, in 2010–2011, and as Nell in Passion Play by Peter Nichols in 2013. In 2014, Bond acted and sang in the West End musical production of Dirty Rotten Scoundrels, playing the role of Muriel Eubanks. Bond stated in an interview that she had not sung on stage in over 30 years and was nervous at the prospect. In a Radio Times review of the play, the critic described Bond as "stage royalty" and "hilarious." In October and November 2017, Bond appeared in the English language premiere of Florian Zeller's modern French farce, The Lie, once again alongside her husband, Alexander Hanson, at the Off-West End theatre, the Menier Chocolate Factory.

=== Television and film ===
In 1989, Bond starred as Mary MacKenzie, a young Scottish woman, in the television adaptation of Oswald Wynd's novel The Ginger Tree, and alongside Tim Robbins in an independent fantasy film, Erik the Viking.

She appeared in a 1990 adaptation of Agatha Christie's short story The Adventure of the Cheap Flat for the series Agatha Christie's Poirot on ITV, starring David Suchet as Hercule Poirot. Bond was also seen on ITV in an episode of the "Inspector Morse" detective drama series based on novels by Colin Dexter, in 1992, and in a 1995 episode of Ghosts, an anthology series of ghost stories on the BBC. In 1996, she portrayed Mrs. Weston in the television movie Jane Austen's Emma, starring Kate Beckinsale as Emma, a Meridian-ITV/A&E production that has been described as grittier and "more authentic" to Austen's story than the theatrical film starring Gwyneth Paltrow that was released the same year.

From 1995 to 2002, Bond played Miss Moneypenny, M's secretary at MI6, opposite Dench as M and Pierce Brosnan as Agent 007: GoldenEye, Tomorrow Never Dies, The World Is Not Enough, and Die Another Day. The role of Miss Moneypenny is the smallest role she ever played, yet the character remains a favorite among James Bond fans. In a BBC interview, Bond remarked that she retired from the role when Pierce Brosnan stepped down as the lead.

Bond co-starred in 2004 with Peter Davison, as a married couple who uproot themselves to a remote island to save their marriage, in the ITV drama-comedy Distant Shores. In 2007, she played the villain Mrs. Wormwood in the pilot episode of the BBC children's drama series The Sarah Jane Adventures, a spin-off of Doctor Who. She later came back to play the same character in the two-part finale of the show's second series, Enemy of the Bane.

Bond guest-starred in three episodes of the murder mystery series Midsomer Murders: Destroying Angel in 2001, Shot at Dawn in 2008, both starring fellow RSC member John Nettles in the lead role of DCI Tom Barnaby, as well as the first episode in 2011's series 14, Death in the Slow Lane.

From 2007 to 2014, Bond had a recurring role as Auntie Angela in the BBC's semi-improvised comedy series Outnumbered, alongside Hugh Dennis, Claire Skinner and David Ryall.

From 2010 through 2015, Bond appeared as Lady Rosamund Painswick in the ensemble cast of ITV's drama series Downton Abbey, written and produced by Julian Fellowes. Each series was shown in the US on PBS's Masterpiece program one year after its broadcast in the UK; according to PBS, Downton Abbey became the most watched drama ever shown on the station, and the most watched series in the history of Masterpiece. Lady Rosamund is the widowed, wealthy sister of Robert Crawley, the Earl of Grantham. Bond's first appearance was in the last episode of the first series; she appeared in 18 episodes in total.

The ITV show Home Fires, featured Bond as Frances Barden, a woman working to strengthen connections among the women in her small English village by keeping the local Women's Institute operating during the early days of World War II. The show premiered in the UK in 2015 and was cancelled in 2016; fans petitioned ITV to reinstate it, to no avail. It played in the US on PBS's Masterpiece in 2016 and 2017, where viewers were similarly disappointed to learn of the show's demise. The series creator, Simon Block, has stated he intends to continue the story in written form, as novels. In 2020 Bond played Joanne Henderson in Death in Paradise (S9:E5). In September 2023, Bond starred in the Channel 5 drama series The Inheritance, appearing alongside Rob James-Collier, Jemima Rooper, Gaynor Faye and Adil Ray.

=== Audiobooks ===
Bond has narrated a number of audiobooks including Mary Norton's The Borrowers, Joanna Trollope's An Unsuitable Match, Anthony Horowitz's Magpie Murders and Helen Fielding's Bridget Jones's Baby: The Diaries' 'Goldeneye. She has most recently released S J Bennett's novel, The Windsor Knot. She received an Earphones Award for Magpie Murders.

== Personal life ==
Bond lives in St Margarets, London, and has been married since 1989 to Alexander Hanson, with whom she has two children. She received an honorary doctorate from the University of Northampton in 2014.

== Filmography ==
=== Film ===
Year	Title	Role	Notes
1989	Erik the Viking	Helga	
1995	GoldenEye	Miss Moneypenny	
1996	Emma	Miss Taylor	
1997	Breakout	Dr. Lisa Temple	
1997	Tomorrow Never Dies	Miss Moneypenny	
1998	What Rats Won't Do	Jane	
1999	The World Is Not Enough	Miss Moneypenny	
2001	The Children's Midsummer Night's Dream	Hippolyta	Voice
2002	Die Another Day	Miss Moneypenny	
2004	Blinded	Dr. Caroline Lamor	
2004	Yes	Kate	
2004	Strings	Eike	Voice
2007	Clapham Junction	Marion Rowan	
2007	Consenting Adults	Jill Wolfenden	
2008	A Bunch of Amateurs	Dorothy Nettle	
2011	London's Burning	Police Superintendent	
2017	A Royal Winter	Beatrice	
2018	The Queen and I	Queen Elizabeth II	
2019	Cold Blood	Mrs Kessler	
2021	School's Out Forever	Georgina Baker	
2021	The Kindred	Gillian Burrows	
2022	The Presence of Love	Merryn	
2022	Downton Abbey: A New Era	Lady Rosamund Painswick	
2022	The Stranger in Our Bed	Isadora	
2022	Hounded	Katherine Redwick	

=== Television ===
Year	Title	Role	Notes
1983	Mansfield Park	Maria Bertram	5 episodes
1985	Agatha Christie's Miss Marple	Julia Simmons	Episode: "A Murder is Announced"
1985	Theatre Night	Rose Trelawny	Episode: "Trelawny of the 'Wells'"
1986	The Understanding	Kate	TV film
1987	Rumpole of the Bailey	Elizabeth "Miz Liz" Probert	4 episodes
1989	The Ginger Tree	Mary Mackenzie	All 4 episodes
1989	Screen One	Sue	Episode: "One Way Out"
1990	Agatha Christie's Poirot	Stella Robinson	Episode: "The Adventure of the Cheap Flat"
1991	The Black Candle	Bridget Mordaunt	TV film
1992	Inspector Morse	Helen Marriat	Episode: "Dead on Time"
1992	Thacker	Ginny Morgan	TV film
1994	Screen Two	Sally	Episode: "Return to Blood River"
1995	Tears Before Bedtime	Sarah Baylis	4 episodes
1995	Ghosts	Maddy	Episode: "The Chemistry Lesson"
1995	Under the Moon	Francesca Jenson	TV film
1996	In Suspicious Circumstances	Daisy Holt	Episode: "The Great Romancer"
1997	Family Money	Isabel	Episode: #1.1
1997	Mr. White Goes To Westminster	Helen Nash MP	TV film
1997	The Ruby Ring	Mary Spencer	TV film
1997	Thief Takers	Carol Mason	Episode: "Sisters in Arms"
1998–2000	The Bill	Mary McMahon	3 episodes
2000	The Bookfair Murders	Marsha Hillier	TV film
2000	Harry Enfield's Brand Spanking New Show	Various	12 episodes
2001	The Hunt	Lady Patricia Whitton	TV film
2001	NCS: Manhunt	DS Maureen Picasso	8 episodes
2001	The Bombmaker	Patsy	TV film
2001	Kavanagh QC	Sarah Swithen	Episode: "The End of Law"
2001	Midsomer Murders	Suzanna Chambers	Episode: "Destroying Angel"
2003	Canterbury Tales	Jane Barlow	Episode: "The Wife of Bath"
2004	DNA	Kate Donovan	All episodes
2005	The Murder Room	Caroline Dupayne	Both 2 episodes
2005–2006	Donovan	Kate Donovan	3 episodes
2007	Fanny Hill	Mrs Cole	2 episodes
2007	Mobile	Rachel West	Episode: "The Boss"
2007	The Inspector Lynley Mysteries	Vivienne Oborne	Episode: "Limbo"
2007–2008	The Sarah Jane Adventures	Mrs Wormwood	3 episodes
2007–2014	Outnumbered	Auntie Angela	10 episodes
2008	Midsomer Murders	Arabella Hammond	Episode: "Shot at Dawn"
2008	Distant Shores	Lisa Shore	All 12 episodes
2008	Hotel Babylon	Caroline	Episode: #3.8
2009	Lark Rise to Candleford	Celestia Brice Coulson	Episode: #2.8
2009	Agatha Christie's Marple	Sylvia Savage	Episode: "Why Didn't They Ask Evans?"
2009	Heartbeat	Sylvia Swinton	Episode: "Deadlier Than the Male"
2009	The Queen	Queen Elizabeth II	Episode: "Us and Them"
2010	New Tricks	Anne Gorton	Episode: "Left Field"
2010–2015	Downton Abbey	Lady Rosamund Painswick	18 episodes Nominated - Screen Actors Guild Award for Outstanding Performance by an Ensemble in a Drama Series
2011	Midsomer Murders	Kate Cameron	Episode: "Death in the Slow Lane"
2013	Playhouse Presents	Woman	Episode: "The Call Out"
2015–2016	Home Fires	Frances Barden	All 12 episodes Nominated - Satellite Award for Best Actress – Miniseries or Television Film
2016	Murdoch Mysteries	Lady Suzanne Atherly	2 episodes
2017	Election Spy	Diana	All 9 episodes
2018	Moving On	Sandra	Episode: "The Registrar"
2019	Silent Witness	DS Hannah Quicke	2 episodes
2020	Death in Paradise	Joanne Henderson	Episode: "Switcharoo"
2022	Red Riding Hood: After Ever After	Red Riding Hood	Television film
2023	Dreamland	Orla	2 episodes
2023	The Inheritance	Susan	All 4 episodes
2024–2026	The Marlow Murder Club	Judith Potts	Lead role
2026	Forever Home	Joan Barrie	Episode: #1.1

=== Narrator ===
Year	Title	Role	Notes
2006	James Bond DVD Extras Documentaries	Narrator	DVD extras
2011	Operation Crossbow	Narrator	Documentary
2016	Royal Stories	Narrator	10 episodes
2016	Judi Dench: All the World's Her Stage	Narrator	Documentary
2018	Meghan: The First 100 Days	Narrator	Documentary
2019	Inside the Mind of Agatha Christie	Narrator	Documentary
2019	Fighter Pilot: The Real Top Gun	Narrator	TV series
2020	Secrets of the Superyachts	Narrator	Documentary
2020	Agatha Christie: 100 Years of Suspense	Narrator	Documentary
2020	Game Shows: Then and Now	Narrator	Documentary
2021-2023	Secrets of the Royal Palaces	Narrator	TV series
2021	Agatha Christie’s England	Narrator	Documentary
2022	The Marvellous Maggie Smith	Narrator	Documentary
2024	Malta: The Jewel of the Med	Narrator	TV series

=== Video games ===
Year	Title	Role	Notes
2021	Evil Genius 2: World Domination	Emma	A playable character

=== Stage ===
- Daisy Pulls It Off (Denise Deegan) at the Nuffield Theatre, 1983
- Les Liaisons Dangereuses (Christopher Hampton) (Royal Shakespeare Company) at the Ambassadors Theatre, 1987
- Hero and Leander (Royal Shakespeare Company) at the Barbican Theatre, 1987
- Lorca's Women (Royal Shakespeare Company) at the Barbican Theatre, 1987
- Man of the Moment (Alan Ayckbourn) at the Globe Theatre, 1990
- Rosalind in As You Like It (Royal Shakespeare Company) at the Royal Shakespeare Theatre, 1992
- Hermione in The Winter's Tale (Royal Shakespeare Company) at the Royal Shakespeare Theatre, 1992
- Rosalind in As You Like It (Royal Shakespeare Company) at the Barbican Theatre, 1993
- Hermione in The Winter's Tale (Royal Shakespeare Company) at the Barbican Theatre, 1993
- Infanta in Le Cid (Pierre Corneille) at the Cottesloe Theatre, 1994. Nominated for an Olivier Award for Best Actress in a Supporting Role.
- Amy in Amy's View (David Hare), 1997 and 1998
- The Memory of Water (Shelagh Stephenson), 1998
- Amy in Amy's View (David Hare) at the Ethel Barrymore Theatre, 1999. Nominated for a Tony Award for Best Featured Actress in a Play. Nominated for Outer Critics Circle Award for Outstanding Featured Actress in a Play.
- Hippolyta and Titania in A Midsummer Night's Dream (Royal Shakespeare Company) at the Barbican Hall, 2001
- Dinner with Friends (Donald Margulies) at the Hampstead Theatre, 2001
- The Vagina Monologues, 2002
- Lady Macbeth in Macbeth, 2002 and 2003
- Mrs Arbuthnot in A Woman of No Importance (Oscar Wilde) at the Haymarket Theatre, 2003
- The Rubenstein Kiss (James Phillips) at the Hampstead Theatre, 2005
- Donkey's Years (Michael Frayn) at London's Comedy Theatre, 2006. Nominated for an Olivier Award for Best Actress in a Supporting Role.
- Hannah in David Leveaux's West End revival of Tom Stoppard's Arcadia at the Duke of York's Theatre, 2009
- Mrs. Cheveley in An Ideal Husband (Oscar Wilde), 2010–2011
- Mrs Prentice in What The Butler Saw (Joe Orton) at the Vaudeville Theatre, 2012
- Nell in Passion Play (Peter Nichols), 2013
- Muriel Eubanks in Dirty Rotten Scoundrels, 2014. Nominated for an Olivier Award for Best Actress in a Supporting Role in a Musical category. Nominated for Best Actress in a Supporting Role in a Musical category at the WhatsOnStage Awards.
- Appeared in English language premiere of Florian Zeller's modern French farce, The Lie, 2017

== Awards and nominations ==
=== Television ===
Year	Award	Category	Work	Result
2017	Screen Actors Guild Award	Outstanding Performance by an Ensemble in a Drama Series	Downton Abbey	Nominated

=== Theatre ===
Year	Award	Category	Work	Result
1995	Laurence Olivier Award	Best Actress in a Supporting Role	Le Cid	Nominated
1999	Tony Award	Best Performance by a Featured Actress in a Play	Amy's View	Nominated
1999	Outer Critics Circle Award	Outstanding Featured Actress in a Play	Amy's View	Nominated
2007	Laurence Olivier Award	Best Performance in a Supporting Role	Donkey's Years	Nominated
2015	Laurence Olivier Award	Best Actress in a Supporting Role in a Musical	Dirty Rotten Scoundrels	Nominated

Acting roles
Preceded by Caroline Bliss	Miss Moneypenny actress 1995 – 2002	Succeeded by Naomie Harris
Preceded by Emilia Fox	Elizabeth II actress 2009	Succeeded by Susan Jameson
