= Jemima Rooper =

British actress

- Born: London, England
- Occupation: Actress
- Years active: 1993–present
- Partner: Ben Ockrant
- Children: 2

Jemima Rooper (roʊpər/ROH-pur) is an English actress. Having started as a child actress in television series, she has appeared in numerous film and theatre roles.

== Early life ==
Born in Hammersmith, London, Rooper is the daughter of TV journalist Alison Rooper. She attended Redcliffe Gardens School in Chelsea and the Godolphin and Latymer School. While working on The Famous Five, she passed eight GCSEs with A* and A grades. From there she went to MPW sixth form college where she got three A-grade A levels. Rooper bought her first home at the age of 19.

== Career ==
Rooper expressed a wish to be an actress at the age of nine and contacted an agent. Her first professional roles were in the 1993 film The Higher Mortals and the 1994 film Willie's War. In 1996, she appeared in all episodes as George in Enid Blyton's The Famous Five.

She said:

I remember writing "I want to act" on my bed in lipstick. I think I told my mum I wanted to be an actress and she said I needed an agent to do that. I must have said: "Well, I'm going to get one"—and I think that's why. She was devastated. She said: "Please don't be an actress, be a doctor or lawyer." But I was very tunnel-visioned about it all. I'm an only child and I spent a lot of time alone. I played a lot of imaginary games. I just wanted to dress up and be weird, I suppose.

After several small roles in British TV series, Jemima took the role of Nicki Sutton in the popular Channel 4 teenage series As If, which successfully ran for three years. Her next appearance was in the supernatural drama Hex where she played a lovable lesbian ghost named Thelma. Hex aired on Sky One and ran for two series between 2004 and 2005.

Rooper made her Hollywood debut in The Black Dahlia. In 2008 she starred in the TV series Lost in Austen. In 2013 she played a role as Medusa in Atlantis. Also guest starred in Agatha Christie's Poirot. She also played a lead role in Her Naked Skin, a new play at the National Theatre. In December 2010, Rooper was cast in the musical Me and My Girl at Sheffield's Crucible Theatre, alongside Miriam Margolyes. Having been featured in films including The Railway Children, A Sound of Thunder, Kinky Boots, One Chance and The F Word (as the on-screen sister of Daniel Radcliffe's character) since 2003, she has since appeared in numerous guest roles on British series including Father Brown. As a voice actress, Rooper voiced companion Izzy Sinclair in Doctor Who, in Big Finish Productions audio dramas.

In September 2023, Rooper starred in the Channel 5 drama series The Inheritance, appearing alongside Samantha Bond, Rob James-Collier, Gaynor Faye and Adil Ray.

== Stage ==
Rooper was seen on stage in One Man, Two Guvnors, which was favourably reviewed. She has since appeared in Blithe Spirit and Breeders in the West End.

== Filmography ==
=== Film ===
Year	Title	Role	Notes
1993	The Higher Mortals	Vicky	
1994	Willie's War	Annabel	
1998	Owd Bob	Maggie Moore	
2002	Snapshots	Narma (20 years old)	
2005	A Sound of Thunder	Jenny Krase	
2005	Kinky Boots	Nicola	
2006	The Black Dahlia	Lorna Mertz	
2011	Hotel Caledonia	Casey Wright	
2013	One Chance	Hydrangea	
2013	The F Word	Ellie	
2022	Matriarch	Laura	
2022	The People We Hate at the Wedding	Mimzy	
2024	Here	Virginia	

=== Television ===
Year	Title	Role	Notes
1996–1997	The Famous Five	George	Series regular
1998	Animal Ark	Rachel Farmer	Episode; "Guinea Pig in the Garage"
1999	Junk	Gemma Brogan	TV film
1999	The Passion	Alice	TV series
1999	Shockers: Dance	Anne	TV film
1999	Wives and Daughters	Lizzie Goodenough	Miniseries
2000	Summer in the Suburbs	Judie Lyle	TV film
2000	The Railway Children	Bobbie	TV film
2000	Life Force	Siren	Episode: "Siren Song"
2000	Urban Gothic	Nik	Episode: "Dead Meat"
2001	Love in a Cold Climate	Jassy	Miniseries
2001–2004	As If	Nicki Sutton	Series regular
2004	Midsomer Murders	Jo Clifford	Episode: "The Straw Woman"
2005	The Brief	Mia Ottway	Episode 2.2
2004–2005	Hex	Thelma Bates	Series regular
2006	Sugar Rush	Montana	Episode 2.5
2006	Silent Witness	Claire Ashen	2 episodes; "Schism: Part 1", "Schism: Part 2"
2006	Sinchronicity	Fi	Series regular
2006	Perfect Day: The Millennium	Amber	TV film
2006	Random Quest	Gerry	TV film
2007	Life Line	Catt	TV film
2007	The Time of Your Life	Emma	Series regular
2008	Agatha Christie's Poirot	Norma Restarick	Episode: "Third Girl"
2008	Lost in Austen	Amanda Price	Miniseries, 4 episodes
2010	Reunited	Sophie	TV movie
2010	Bouquet of Barbed Wire	Sarah Francis	Miniseries, 3 episodes
2011	Frankenstein's Wedding	Justine Mortiz	Television film
2013–2015	Atlantis	Medusa	Main role
2014	Blandings	Lesley Drabble	Episode: "Hallo to All This"
2017	Fearless	Maggie	3 episodes
2018	Death in Paradise	Karen Marston	Episode: "Murder From Above"
2018	Trauma	Nora Baker	3 episodes
2019	Father Brown	Lilith Crowe	Episode: "The Whistle in the Dark“
2019	Silent Witness	Amy Marlow	Episode: "Two Spirits" Part 1 & 2
2019	Gold Digger	Della Day	Miniseries, 6 episodes
2021	The Girlfriend Experience	Leanne	Season 3; 7 episodes
2022	The Split	India	Series 3
2022	Flowers in the Attic: The Origin	Olivia Winfield	Miniseries
2023	Sister Boniface Mysteries	Verity Martin	Episode: "The It Girl"
2023	Grantchester	Josephine Hanlan	Season 8; Episode 3
2023	The Inheritance	Chloe	4 episodes
2024	Geek Girl	Annabel Manners	Main role
2024	The Famous Five	Angela Clutterbuck	Episode: "Mystery at the Prospect Hotel"

=== Video games ===
Year	Title	Role	Notes
2023	The Isle Tide Hotel	Rebecca Price	Interactive film

== Theatre ==
- Where Do We Live – Royal Court Theatre, Jerwood Theatre Upstairs, May 2002 (playing Lily)
- Us and Them – Hampstead Theatre, June 2003 (playing Izzie)
- A Respectable Wedding (part of The Big Brecht Fest) – Young Vic, April 2007 (playing Bride)
- Her Naked Skin – National Theatre, July 2008 (playing Eve Douglas)
- The Great Game: Afghanistan – Tricycle Theatre, April – June 2009
- The Power of Yes – National Theatre October 2009
- All My Sons – Apollo Theatre, May – October 2010 (playing Ann Deever)
- Me and My Girl – Jan 2011 (playing Sally)
- One Man, Two Guvnors- National Theatre June 2011 (playing Rachel Crabbe)
- Blithe Spirit – Gielgud Theatre, March 2014 (playing Elvira)
- Breeders by Ben Ockrent – St James Theatre, September 2014
- Blithe Spirit – Ahmanson Theatre, Los Angeles, December 2014 – January 2015 (playing Elvira)
- Hand to God – Vaudeville Theatre, London, February 2016
- Little Shop of Horrors – Regent's Park Open Air Theatre, London, August – September 2018 (playing Audrey)
