= Gaynor Faye =

English actress (born 1971)

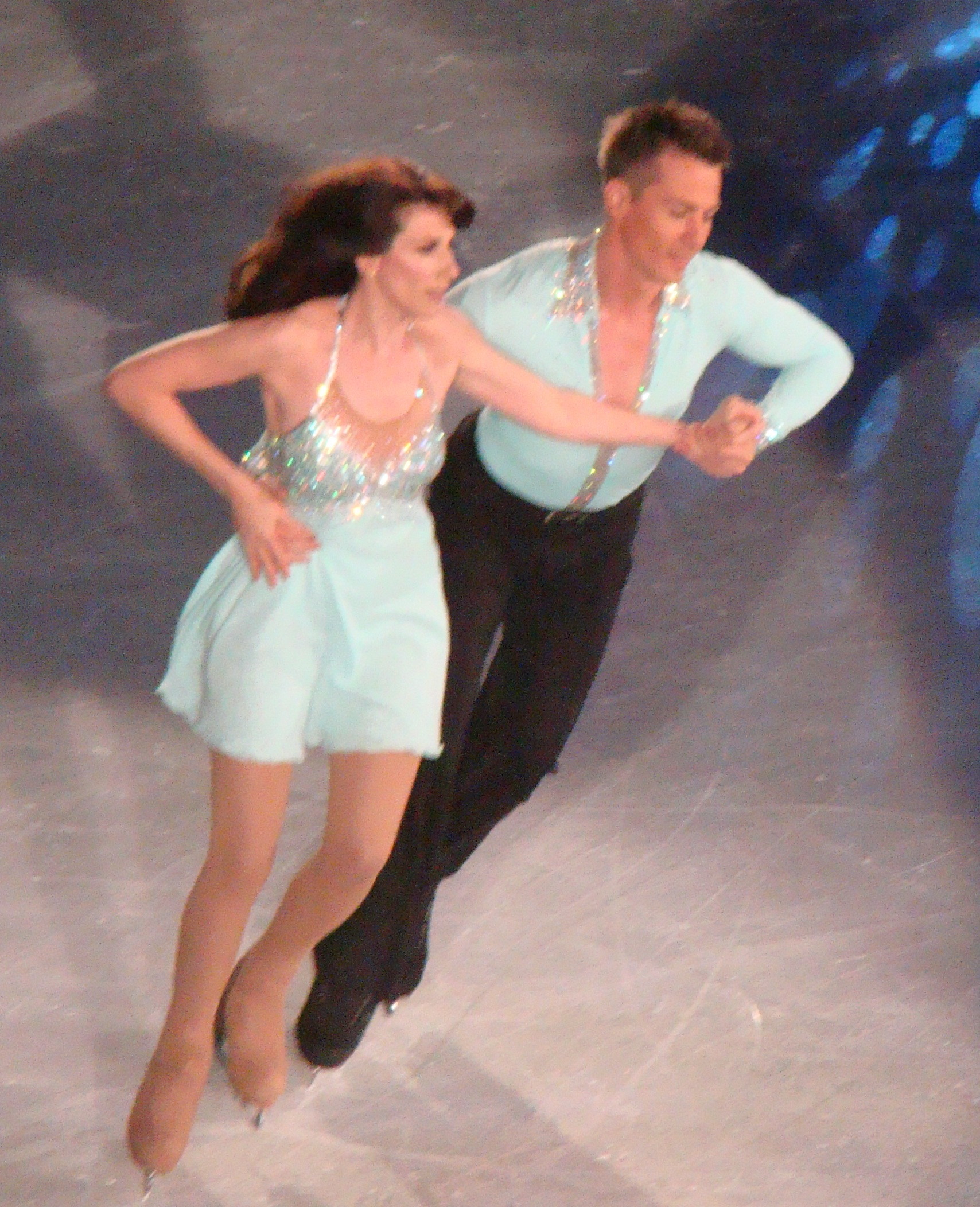
- Faye and Matt Evers on the Dancing on Ice tour in 2010
- Born: Gaynor Kay Mellor; 26 August 1971 (age 54); Leeds, West Riding of Yorkshire, England
- Occupation: Actress
- Years active: 1991–present
- Partner: Mark Pickering
- Children: 2
- Mother: Kay Mellor

Gaynor Kay Mellor (born 26 August 1971), known professionally as Gaynor Faye, is an English actress and writer. She played Judy Mallett in television soap opera Coronation Street from 1995 until 1999 and Megan Macey in Emmerdale from 2012 until 2019.

== Early life ==
Gaynor Faye was born in Leeds, England, to TV scriptwriter Kay Mellor and Anthony Mellor. Her maternal grandmother was Jewish. She has one sister, Yvonne.

== Career ==
Faye has played the roles of Holly Quinn in BBC television drama series Playing the Field, Lauren Harris in Fat Friends, Georgia Lovett in Between the Sheets and Julie in Stan the Man. She has also written two episodes of Fat Friends.

Faye played the role of Judy Mallett in ITV's Coronation Street from 2 October 1995 to 26 September 1999. The Malletts moved into 9 Coronation Street in 1995. Judy was an arcade assistant, and later a barmaid at the Rovers Return. Brash and strong-willed, Judy had a sensitive side, too, and longed to have children. Before the arrival of twins in 1998, Judy had believed she was unable to conceive, leading the Malletts to buy pregnant teen Zoe Tattersall's baby, naming the child Katie. They were left heartbroken when Zoe broke the agreement and took back her daughter. Less than a year after becoming a mother, Judy was involved in a minor car accident, causing an undetected blood clot in her leg. A few days later, she died suddenly when hanging out washing at No.9; Gary was attending Ashley and Maxine Peacock's wedding.

In 2006, Faye appeared in ITV's Dancing on Ice. Her skating partner was Daniel Whiston. On 4 March 2006, she was crowned the inaugural Dancing on Ice champion. From 2006 to 2007, Faye starred as Anna Williams Bedford in The Chase, a television series co-written with her mother for BBC One. Faye released a video based on the exercise routine she followed during Dancing on Ice.

Faye appeared in the stage adaptation of Calendar Girls alongside Lynda Bellingham at London's Noël Coward Theatre in 2009. This was written by Juliette Towhidi and Tim Firth.

In September 2010, she was a guest panellist on ITV's Loose Women. In 2011, Faye played Zarina Wix in children's programme Dani's House. In October 2011, it was announced that Faye would join the ITV soap opera Emmerdale, playing Declan Macey's ambitious half-sister Megan Macey. Megan first appeared on-screen on 21 February 2012. Faye left the role in 2019. On 11 November and 16 December 2011, she guest presented the ITV Breakfast programme Lorraine.

In March 2021, Faye appeared in the BBC One drama The Syndicate as Cheryl Armitage. Since 2021, Faye has narrated Hornby: A Model World following the works of Hornby, Scalextrics, and Airfix on the Yesterday channel. In September 2023, Faye starred in the Channel 5 drama series The Inheritance, appearing alongside Samantha Bond, Jemima Rooper, Rob James-Collier and Adil Ray.

== Personal life ==
Faye lives with long-term partner Mark Pickering in Leeds, West Yorkshire. The couple have two children.

During the COVID-19 pandemic, Faye took online courses in semantics, Spanish and counselling. She said, "I know people who really struggle with their mental health and it’s important for me to know what to do for my family, my kids, my loved ones – to help people when they’re struggling. To help other people is what I want to do." Faye practises Buddhism. She told OK! magazine: "I've been a Buddhist since I asked a friend 25 years ago what skin cream she used because she was so glowing and she said: "It’s not cream, it’s because I chant" [...] It's just part of my life now, it's like brushing my teeth. In the morning, I do it to set up my life and so I can live in a higher life state."

== Filmography ==
Year	Title	Role	Notes
1991	The Sharp End	Crystal	8 episodes
1992	The Life and Times of Harry Pratt	Mabel Billington	Series 1 episode 4
1994	Fair Game	Boggle Hole Girl	Television film
1994	Downwardly Mobile	Mandy	Series 1 episode 3: Underarm Combat
1994–1995	Peak Practice	WPC Benson	3 episodes
1995	The Chief	Probation Officer	1 episode
1995	Men of the World	Judy	Series 2 episode 5: Stolen Kiss
1995	Coogan's Run	The Prostitute	Series 1 episode 2: Death of a Salesman
1995–1999	Coronation Street	Judy Mallett	353 episodes
1996	Some Kind of Life	Lorraine	Television film
1999	Fanny and Elvis	Samantha	
2000–2002	Playing the Field	Holly Quinn	13 episodes
2000–2005	Fat Friends	Lauren Harris	22 episodes
2002	Stan the Man	Julie	1 episode
2003	Murder in Mind	Alyson Holt	Series 3 episode 2: Favours
2003	Between the Sheets	Georgia Lovett	6 episodes
2006	Mayo	Kitty McNally	1 episode
2006–2007	The Chase	Anna Williams/Anna Williams Bedford	20 episodes
2006–2010	Dancing on Ice	Herself/Presenter	13 episodes
2007–2020	Loose Women	Herself/Presenter	11 episodes
2007, 2011	Casualty	Diane Adlington/Jane Reardon	2 episodes
2009	Economy Gastronomy	Narrator	6 episodes; voice only
2011–2012	Dani's House	Zarina/Zanna Wix	13 episodes
2012–2019	Emmerdale	Megan Macey	805 episodes
2019	Worthless	Marge	Short film
2021	The Syndicate	Cheryl	Series 4; 6 episodes
2023	The Inheritance	Sian	4 episodes
TBA	Dark Mountain	Epona	Short film; currently in post-production

== Awards and nominations ==
Year	Award	Category	Work	Result	Ref.
2006	12th National Television Awards	Most Popular TV Contender	Dancing on Ice	Nominated	
2007	TVQuick & TVChoice Awards	Best Actress	The Chase	Nominated	
2012	Inside Soap Awards	Best Newcomer	Emmerdale	Nominated	
2012	Inside Soap Awards	Best Bitch	Emmerdale	Nominated	
2013	Inside Soap Awards	Best Bitch	Emmerdale	Nominated	
2014	Inside Soap Awards	Best Bitch	Emmerdale	Nominated	
