= Adil Ray =

British comedian and presenter (born 1974)

Adil Ray OBE
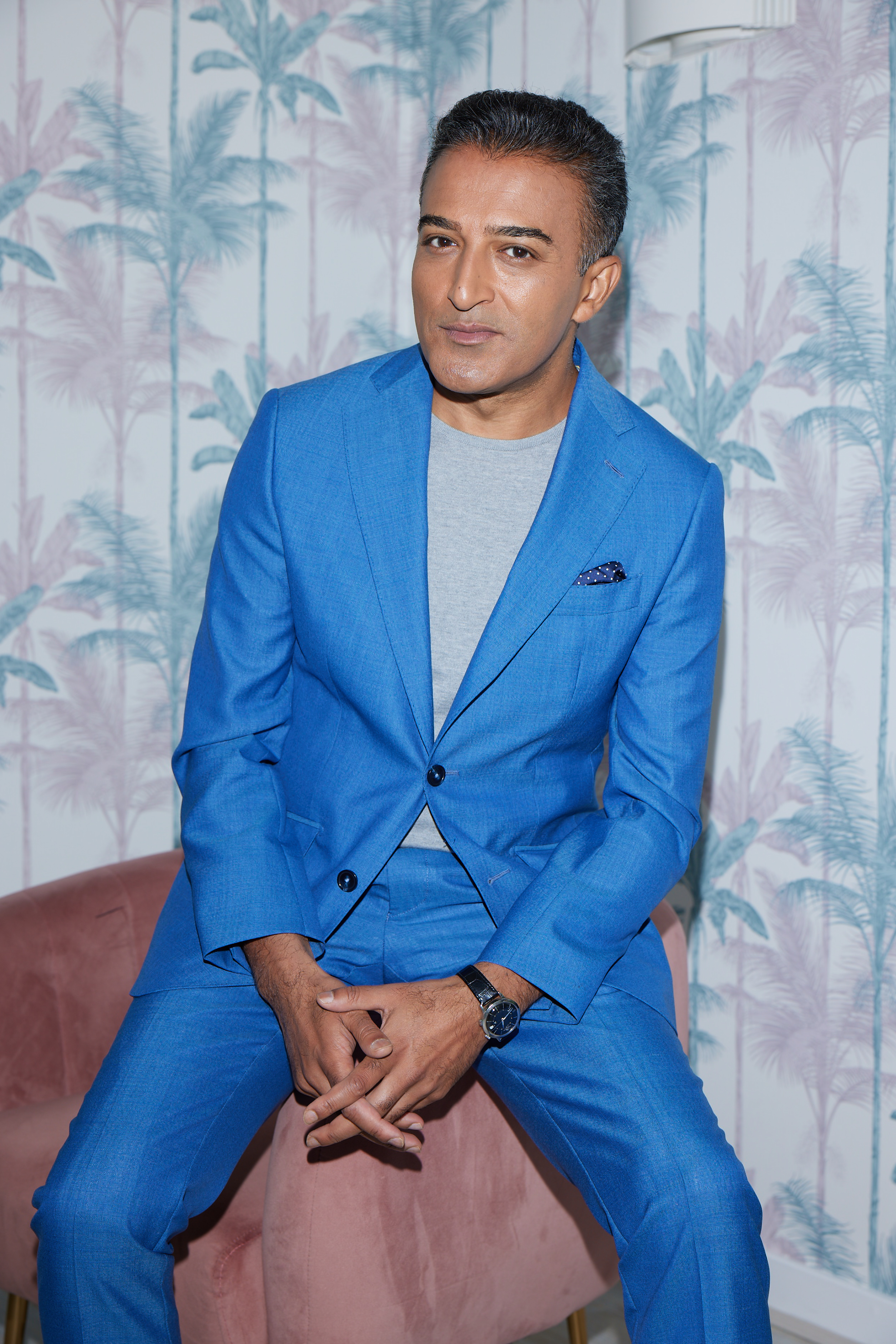
- Ray in 2012
- Born: 26 April 1974 (age 52); Birmingham, England
- Education: University of Huddersfield (BA)
- Notable work: Citizen Khan; Bellamy's People; Exposed: Groomed For Sex; The Adil Ray Radio Show; Ackley Bridge; Good Morning Britain; Lingo

Comedy career
- Years active: 1992–present
- Medium: Television; radio; documentary; lifestyle
- Genres: Character comedy; sketch comedy
- Subjects: Islamic humour; Pakistani culture
- Ray's voice recorded April 2014
- Website: adilray.com

Adil Ray OBE (Punjabi: عادل رے, born 26 April 1974) is a British actor, comedian and radio/television presenter. Ray is best known as the creator, co-writer and star of the long-running BBC One scripted comedy series Citizen Khan (2012–2016), and as a presenter on ITV's Good Morning Britain and on various BBC radio stations. He played the role of Sadiq Nawaz in the Channel 4 drama series Ackley Bridge, and also had major roles in Channel 5 drama series The Inheritance, ITV period drama series Beecham House, and in feature films Blithe Sprit, Arthur's Whisky, and Picture This. Since 2021, he has presented the revival of the British game show Lingo.

== Early life ==
Ray was born in Birmingham, England, to a Punjabi Muslim father from Lahore, and an Indo-Kenyan mother. He was brought up in the suburb of Yardley. Ray's father Abdul worked as a bus driver for almost forty years. His mother worked for the Immigration Appeals Department in the Civil Service and was of Buganda and Kenyan Asian ancestry.

Ray attended Yardley Junior and Infant School and Handsworth Grammar School, his first day being the day after the Handsworth Riots in 1985. Ray was a keen cricketer and represented Birmingham and District Premier League side West Bromwich Dartmouth during the late-1980s and early-1990s. Ray graduated from the University of Huddersfield with a 2:1 BA (Hons) in Marketing in 1997.

== Career ==
Ray began his career as a radio host on a pirate radio station in Huddersfield while studying at the University of Huddersfield, and DJing at the university venue Eden (1992). Later, during his placement year, he got a job with a new small Asian radio station in Birmingham, where he spent the first half of the year, before moving on to Choice FM (1995). In 1997, Ray landed a spot with Galaxy 105. He then joined Century Radio in Manchester, Radio Aire Leeds and Ministry of Sound Radio.

=== BBC ===
Ray joined the BBC Asian Network in 2002 to present the late-night Adil Ray Show. In May 2006, Ray took over the drive time afternoon slot, and from January 2009 he presented the station's Breakfast Show from 7:00am each weekday. In 2008, The Adil Ray Show won the best radio show category at the UK Asian Music Awards.

Ray has been a regular on BBC Radio 5 Live presenting the late night show, the Football and Cricket 606 phone ins, Victoria Derbyshire, Weekend Breakfast and Fighting Talk. Ray has also fronted documentaries for BBC Radio 4, including Picturing Britain and Towering Ambition. He has also appeared in the award-winning BBC Asian Network radio soap, Silver Street.

He also presented the British Asian Arts and Lifestyle show Desi DNA on BBC Two, and hosted the BBC Four programme Tales from Europe where he explored the 24-hour lifestyle in Madrid. In 2007, Ray presented the Royal Television Society award-nominated show Is it Cos I Is Black? for BBC Three where he looked at the issue of political correctness. He has also filmed a documentaries strand for BBC Two called Explore, in which he reported from Argentina and Turkey. In 2010 he appeared in the BBC Two comedy show Bellamy's People, playing characters including self-appointed "community leader" Mr Khan and Birmingham "Muslim DJ" MC Raa.

In 2010, Ray reprised his role as Mr. Khan to feature in his own web series for BBC Comedy to cover the UK general election. Mr. Khan returned later in the year with a follow-up BBC Comedy web series about the cricket to coincide with the Pakistan national team's visit to England that year.

In the summer of 2010, Ray joined BBC Radio 5 Live as part of their cricket coverage, travelling to Sri Lanka and Bangladesh to cover the 2011 Cricket World Cup. He can often be heard presenting the 5 Live late-night show. Ray continues to make documentaries for BBC Radio 4 including The Real Mr. Khan, a documentary looking into the role of community leaders. Ray also tackled the issue of sex and grooming in the British Pakistani community in a BBC Radio 4 documentary entitled The Sex Lives of British Pakistanis that was broadcast on 4 July 2011, as well as a highly acclaimed BBC Three documentary in December 2011 – Exposed: Groomed For Sex.

Ray continued his venture into comedy including the radio pilot Sparkhill Sound that broadcast on BBC Radio 4 on 12 May 2011. A community radio station set in Birmingham. Ray was both writer and performer alongside Anil Gupta (writer), Gary Pillai, and Vineeta Rishi (cast).

In 2015, Ray guest presented three episodes of The One Show alongside Alex Jones.

In 2019, Ray hosted S58E05 of Have I Got News For You, appearing alongside team captains Paul Merton and Ian Hislop, and panellists Ivo Graham and Helen Lewis. Ray also hosted S60E02 of Have I Got A Bit More News For You in 2020, alongside Merton and Hislop, with guests Kiri Pritchard-McLean and Nicky Morgan.

==== Citizen Khan ====
In October 2011, Ray performed the co-written comedy Citizen Khan at the BBC Salford Sitcom Showcase, centred on Ray's comedy creation Mr Khan and his long-suffering family. Commissioned as a BBC One primetime series, the Asian Muslim sitcom follows the trials and tribulations of big-hearted, loud-mouthed, tight-fisted, self-appointed community leader Mr Khan (Adil Ray) and his long-suffering family: wife Mrs Khan (Shobu Kapoor) and daughters Shazia (Maya Sondhi) and Alia (Bhavna Limbachia).

The six 30-minute episodes of Citizen Khan were commissioned by Danny Cohen, BBC One Controller, and Cheryl Taylor, Controller of Comedy Commissioning, and have been produced by BBC In-House Comedy. The executive producer was Mark Freeland, the producer was Paul Schlesinger (Twenty Twelve) and the director was Nick Wood (Fresh Meat, Not Going Out, Two Pints of Lager and a Packet of Crisps). Citizen Khan was written by Anil Gupta and Richard Pinto (The Kumars at No 42, Goodness Gracious Me) with Adil Ray. The series was renewed for four further series of six episodes plus a Christmas special each, ending on 23 December 2016.

=== ITV ===
In August 2018, Ray temporarily replaced Piers Morgan as a co-host on ITV's Good Morning Britain.

From February 2019, Ray has become the guest presenter for Good Morning Britain, appearing during the February, April and Summer Holidays.

In 2019, Ray played the role of Murad Beg in ITV's six-part historical drama series Beecham House. The series is set in 1795 in Delhi, India, and co-created, directed and produced by Gurinder Chadha.

In 2020, Ray was scheduled twice weekly during the summer holidays in July and August, covering for the main presenters during their summer break. During this time, Ray continued the show's coverage of the Coronavirus Pandemic, most often presenting on Thursdays with Charlotte Hawkins and Fridays with Ranvir Singh.

Ray portrayed Imran Khan in ITV's acclaimed 2021 mini-series Stephen. The series, written by Frank Cottrell Boyce and Joe Cottrell Boyce, was based on the book in Pursuit of the Truth by DCI Clive Driscoll, about the 1993 murder of Stephen Lawrence, and starred Steve Coogan in the role of DCI Clive Driscoll.

In 2021, Ray began presenting the revival of word-based quiz show Lingo, which premiered on New Year's Day.

In 2023, Ray was chosen to host US pilot episodes of the gameshow Lucky 13.

=== Film ===
In 2020, Ray starred as Mandeep Singh in supernatural comedy Blithe Spirit, alongside Dame Judi Dench, Isla Fischer, Dan Stevens, Leslie Mann and Emilia Clarke. The film, which was based on Noël Coward's 1941 stage farce, is the second feature film adaptation, after David Lean's 1945 version.

Ray starred as James in the 2024 Sky Original film Arthur's Whisky, led by Diane Keaton, Patricia Hodge and Lulu.

In 2025, Ray played Mukul in Amazon Prime Video's original romantic comedy Picture This, which starred Simone Ashley and Hero Fiennes Tiffin in the lead roles.

=== Smooth Radio ===
At the end of December 2024, Ray went back to his radio roots when he joined Smooth Radio as a guest presenter over the Christmas and New Year period. Following his guest presenting success, it was announced that from March 2025, Ray would host his own Saturday mid-morning show.

=== Film and television production ===
Ray is the co-founder and Creative Director of Cornered Tiger, a multi-genre, Birmingham-based production company. Ray and co-founder Debbie Manners launched Cornered Tiger in 2020, with the purpose of developing ideas with diversity at the very heart of its content, and telling new stories by new and emerging diverse talent. Cornered Tiger produced the 2023 documentary Is Cricket Racist? for Channel 4, which was nominated for a 2024 Royal Television Society (Midlands) Documentary award, as well as for Sports Documentary of the Year at the 2023 Broadcast Sport Awards. Cornered Tiger has several projects in development with major terrestrial television broadcasters and streaming platforms.

== Personal life ==
In January 2021, Ray stated he was single and had been for a long time, still looking for "the one". He is a keen cricket fan and supports his local team Warwickshire and the national team of Pakistan. He is also a fan of Aston Villa.

== Political views ==
On 5 November 2025, on social media platform X, he wrote: "Some say [Zohran] Mamdani may implement Sharia Law. He might. The heart of Sharia is social justice, welfare, fairness, charity and cohesion. Most Muslim countries operate a hybrid of Sharia & civil law, are slowly reforming and abandoning unethical practices despite the west’s portrayal." This drew widespread backlash on X and elsewhere. Two days later, Adil said: "To clarify. I am not actually suggesting Mamdani would implement 'sharia law'. But many of the issues he campaigned for are also some of the positive values of Sharia that Muslims try to live by. Something many of us would agree on."

== Charity and campaigns ==
Ray is involved in several charities and foundations: he is an ambassador for the Aston Villa Foundation, a registered charity that delivers the community and charity work of Aston Villa Football Club; a patron of Acorns Children's Hospice, a registered charity offering a network of palliative care and support to life-limited and life-threatened children and their families across the West Midlands region and part of South West England; and an ambassador for Pancreatic Cancer UK.

During the COVID-19 pandemic, Ray spearheaded a campaign to encourage BAME groups across the UK to take the coronavirus vaccine. He created a series of video messages featuring famous persons and personalities from the Black Asian and Minority Ethnic groups, including Romesh Ranganathan, Meera Syal, David Olusoga, Moeen Ali, Beverley Knight, Denise Lewis, Sadiq Khan, Baroness Warsi and others. The videos, which aimed to inform and dispel false myths about the vaccine, were broadcast simultaneously across major terrestrial channels ITV, Channel 4, Channel 5 and Sky.

== Honours, awards and nominations ==
- UK Asian Music Award – Best Radio Show (2008)
- Royal Television Award Nomination – Is It Coz I Is Black (2007)

In January 2013, Ray was nominated for the Arts and Culture Awareness award at the British Muslim Awards.

Ray was appointed Officer of the Order of the British Empire (OBE) in the 2016 Birthday Honours for services to broadcasting.

Since 2017, Ray has been on the board of the National Film and Television School.

== Credits ==
=== Television ===
Year	Title	Role	Broadcaster
2003	The Last Word	Presenter	ITV
2006	Tales from Europe: Madrid	Presenter	BBC Four
2006	Desi DNA Series 1	Presenter	BBC Two
2006–2008	Inside Out	Presenter	
2007	The Heaven and Earth Show	Presenter	BBC One
2007	Desi DNA Series 2	Presenter	
2007	Mischief: Is It Cos I Is Black?	Presenter	BBC Three
2008	Desi DNA Series 3	Presenter	BBC Two
2008	Explore	Presenter	BBC Two
2010	Bellamy's People	Presenter	BBC Two
2010	Talk of the Terrace	Contributor	ESPN
2010	GMTV	Contributor	ITV
2010–2012	Lorraine	Contributor	ITV
2011	Exposed: Groomed for Sex	Presenter	BBC Three
2012–2016	Citizen Khan	Actor/Writer	BBC One
2013	The Matt Lucas Awards	Himself	BBC One
2014	Celebrity Mastermind	Contestant	BBC One
2014	Would I Lie to You?	Himself	BBC One
2015	The One Show	Stand-in presenter (3 episodes)	BBC One
2016	Pointless Celebrities	Himself	BBC One
2017	Who Do You Think You Are	Himself	BBC One
2017–2019	Ackley Bridge	Sadiq Nawaz	Channel 4
2018–present	Good Morning Britain	Stand-in Presenter; Fridays with Kate Garraway (2024–)	ITV
2021–present	Lingo	Presenter	ITV
2023	The Inheritance		4 episodes

=== Radio ===
Year	Title	Role	Broadcaster
2001	The Adil Ray Show	Presenter	Choice FM
2001	The Drivetime Show	Presenter	Galaxy 105
2001	The Adil Ray Show	Presenter	Century Radio
2002	The Adil Ray Show	Presenter	BBC Asian Network
2006	Twenty Minutes	Contributor	BBC Radio 3
2006	The Drivetime Show	Presenter	BBC Asian Network
2008	Silver Street	Actor	BBC Asian Network
2009	The Breakfast Show	Presenter	BBC Asian Network
2009	Excess Baggage	Contributor	BBC Radio 4
2009	Picturing Britain	Presenter	BBC Radio 4
2010	Towering Ambition	Presenter	BBC Radio 4
2010	The Adil Ray Breakfast Show	Presenter	BBC Asian Network
2010	Never Mind The Bhangra	Presenter	BBC Radio 4
2010	The Gethin Jones Show	Contributor	BBC Radio 5 Live
2010	The Cricket Forum	Presenter	BBC Radio 5 Live
2010	606	Presenter	BBC Radio 5 Live
2010	Up All Night	Presenter	BBC Radio 5 Live
2011	Heroes of 2010	Presenter	BBC Radio 5 Live
2011	Cricket World Cup Coverage	Presenter	BBC Radio 5 Live
2011	Sparkhill Sound	Writer/Performer	BBC Radio 4
2011	The Private Lives of British Pakistanis	Presenter	BBC Radio 4
2011	The Victoria Derbyshire Show	Presenter	BBC Radio 5 Live
2011	The Real Mr Khan	Presenter	BBC Radio 4
2011–12	The Tony Livesey Show	Presenter	BBC Radio 5 Live
2018	The Zoe Ball Show	Stand-In Presenter	BBC Radio 2
2025-	Smooth's Saturday Mid-Morning Show	Presenter	Smooth Radio
