= 1993 in British television =

This is a list of British television related events from 1993.

== Events ==
=== January ===
- 1 January
  - Carlton Television takes over the weekday ITV franchise in London at midnight, replacing Thames after 24 years on the air. Meridian takes over the South of England franchise from TVS, Westcountry takes over the South West England franchise from TSW, Good Morning Television, GMTV takes over the national breakfast television franchise from TV-am at 6am and Teletext Ltd takes over the teletext franchise from ORACLE. The first edition of GMTV is presented by Eamonn Holmes and Anne Davies.
  - The Independent Television Commission removes the limit on the value of prizes which can be given away on ITV game shows, set at £6,000 per episode since 1981, paving the way for the big money game shows of the late 1990s and 2000s.
  - Channel 4 becomes an independent statutory corporation. Under the terms of the Broadcasting Act 1990, the channel is now also allowed to sell its own airtime. Under the Act, ITV have agreed to fund Channel 4 if it falls below 14% of total TV advertising revenue. The channel also makes a payment of £38 million to ITV under terms of its funding formula.
  - The London News Network, a joint venture between London's two franchise holders, Carlton and LWT, begins providing a seven-day news service for ITV viewers in London.
  - Scottish Television launches new idents and presentation.
  - HTV launches a new logo and idents.
- 2 January
  - Debut of the Saturday morning children's show Saturday Disney on ITV.
  - ITV airs a one-off special of Stars in Their Eyes dedicated to Elvis Presley. It is presented by Russ Abbot as regular presenter Leslie Crowther continues to recover from head injuries in a car crash the previous October.
- 3 January
  - The final edition of LWT News is broadcast, presented by Anna Maria Ashe.
  - Debut of the Sunday morning current affairs series Breakfast with Frost on BBC1, presented by David Frost.
- 4 January
  - John Birt succeeds Sir Michael Checkland as Director-General of the BBC.
  - At the start of its first full week of broadcasting, GMTV introduces regional news bulletins, something that its predecessor TV-am had never done.
  - Scottish Television launches a 30-minute lunchtime edition of Scotland Today.
  - Launch of the ITV regional news programme London Tonight which airs seven days a week on both Carlton and LWT.
  - Ulster's news service is renamed UTV Live. The programme broadcasts for 60 minutes, instead of 30.
  - The BBC launches Business Breakfast as a 60-minute stand-alone programme. It had previously been part of Breakfast News. Consequently, the BBC's weekday breakfast programmes start half an hour earlier, at 6am. Also on that day, BBC1 begins broadcasting on weekdays at 6am. A start-of-day Ceefax broadcast is retained although it now runs for 15 minutes rather than 30, beginning at 5:45am.
  - The Central-produced children's series Tots TV makes its debut on ITV and starts airing in the US the following day. Its sponsor is Lego Duplo.
- 5 January – The children's series Wizadora makes its debut on ITV.
- 6 January
  - The Times reports that IFE have revised and increased their offer to purchase former ITV franchise holder TVS.
  - The animated series The Animals of Farthing Wood, based on the books by Colin Dann, makes its debut on BBC1.
  - Debut of the acclaimed series Fame in the 20th Century, an eight-part BBC1 programme in which Clive James examines the nature of 20th century fame using archive footage and commentary. The series concludes on 24 February.
- 8 January
  - ITV begins re-airing series 3 of Thomas the Tank Engine & Friends. However, the first few episodes are trimmed to fit the timeslot.
  - The children's comedy programme ZZZap! makes its debut on Children's ITV, starring the 'show you how its done gloves', known as the Handymen, Richard Waites as the trouble-causing Cuthbert Lilly and the sneaky villain Tricky Dicky and Neil Buchanan as the smartest artist Smart Arty.
  - ITV introduces a third weekly episode of The Bill on Friday evenings.
  - After a 14-year absence, the game show Celebrity Squares returns to ITV, with returning host Bob Monkhouse.
- 11 January – Debut of The Good Sex Guide, a ground-breaking late night documentary series on ITV presented by Margi Clarke. Aired at 10.35pm, the programme attracts audience of 13 million, something that is unprecedented for a show aired in a late night timeslot.
- 12 January – Series 7 of The Cook Report began with Roger Cook confronting the Wo Shing Wo Triad of Manchester's Chinatown.
- 14 January – Eurosport and Screensport propose a merger to provide a single channel as both are operating at a loss, hoping that a merged channel would become financially profitable.
- 16 January – ITV airs Alan Parker's 1987 occult detective film Angel Heart, starring Mickey Rourke and Robert De Niro.
- 20 January – BBC2 airs live coverage of the inauguration of Bill Clinton as the 42nd President of the United States.
- 23 January – The Times reports that an offer by IFE to buy TVS for £56.5 million has been accepted.
- 24 January
  - The satellite channels Lifestyle and Lifestyle Satellite Jukebox close.
  - The network television premiere of James Cameron's 1989 Oscar-winning science fiction adventure The Abyss on Channel 4, starring Ed Harris, Mary Elizabeth Mastrantonio and Michael Biehn.

=== February ===
- 1 February
  - IFE completes its deal to buy TVS.
  - BSkyB introduces a new system of film ratings often used for various times, replacing the British Board of Film Classification certificates.
- 6 February – The Casualty episode "Family Matters", which airs today, sees an early appearance of the actress Kate Winslet.
- 7 February – Having completed its initial run of all 692 episodes of Prisoner: Cell Block H in December 1991, Central begins rerunning the series from the first episode. It is shown weekly, late on Sunday evenings until the end of 1994.
- 12–14 February – Channel 4 airs Love Weekend, a series of programmes with sexually explicit content coinciding with Valentine's Day weekend. It includes the network television premiere of Last Tango in Paris, starring Marlon Brando, which is aired uncut on 14 February, Valentine's Day itself. The makers of Tango pay £20,000 for a 30-second advert for the soft drink in the film's first ad break.
- 14–16 February – Sky One debuts Diana: Her True Story, a dramatisation of Andrew Morton's biography of Diana, Princess of Wales. The film features Serena Scott Thomas as the Princess.
- 15 February
  - BBC2 airs Oprah Winfrey's interview with singer Michael Jackson.
  - Children's ITV is officially retitled as CITV, though the logo retains the full name until autumn 1996. As part of a relaunch, the service drops its in-vision continuity in favour of pre-recorded voice-overs mostly done by actor Steve Ryde.
- 16 February – The final episode of Count Duckula is broadcast on ITV.
- 17 February – The original scheduled airdate for Mind the Baby, Mr. Bean, but it is postponed following the murder of Kirkby toddler James Bulger and is delayed for over a year until 25 April the following year. Instead, Mr. Bean in Room 426 is shown in its place.
- 20 February – Channel 4 show the network television premiere of Bruce Robinson's 1987 cult comedy film Withnail and I, starring Richard E. Grant and Paul McGann.
- 24 February
  - John Nettles makes a cameo appearance as Jim Bergerac in an episode of the BBC1 comedy The Detectives set in Jersey.
  - The network television premiere of Rocky IV on ITV, starring Sylvester Stallone, Talia Shire, Carl Weathers, Burt Young, Dolph Lundgren and Brigitte Nielsen.
- 27 February – Boiling Point, an episode of the BBC medical drama Casualty, is broadcast, but it is met with great controversy and outrage after it depicts rioting youths setting fire to a hospital's accident and emergency department. The BBC receives over 700 complaints about the violent nature of the episode, despite it airing after the 9pm watershed and warning viewers accordingly. However, the episode achieves viewing figures of 17.02 million, the highest for the show at this time.
- 28 February – BBC1 airs the first in a twelve-part adaptation of Peter Mayle's memoir A Year in Provence. The series, starring John Thaw and Lindsay Duncan, concludes on 16 May. Unlike the book, however, the miniseries is not well received by critics and, in 2006, it is placed at number ten on a Radio Times list of the worst television programmes ever made. The writer John Naughton describes it as a "smugathon ... which achieved the near impossible – creating a John Thaw vehicle nobody liked".

=== March ===
- 1 March
  - Screensport and Eurosport merge and Screensport closes. They merge to try to turn two loss making channels into a single profitable channel.
  - Games World makes its debut on Sky One.
  - Comedy-drama September Song starring Russ Abbott and Michael Williams makes its debut on ITV.
- 5 March – ITV begins airing Doctor Finlay, a continuation series of the original Dr. Finlay's Casebook that aired during the 1960s.
- 6 March – An IRA bomb scare at BBC Television Centre means that the live Saturday night programme Noel's House Party cannot be broadcast. Instead, after a repeat of the previous year's Noel's Christmas Presents, host Noel Edmonds appears from the Children's BBC broom cupboard to apologise to viewers and introduce a Tom and Jerry cartoon in its place, The Zoot Cat.
- 7 March – The Movie Channel airs a special feature-length version of Star Trek: The Next Generation shown exclusively rather than as part of the main run of the show which features Leonard Nimoy as Spock from the original television series.
- 12 March – BBC1 airs Total Relief, the 1993 Comic Relief telethon.
- 23 March
  - Channel 4 debuts the US horror/science fiction series Eerie, Indiana, starring Omri Katz.
  - Sky One airs Episodes 170 and 171 of the Australian soap E Street which features a hard-hitting storyline involving extreme character Sonny Bennett (Richard Huggett) who kills three characters in a car bomb explosion. Because the episodes air in an early evening timeslot, they are preceded by a warning to viewers that they contain scenes that some may find upsetting. The 12:30pm repeat the following days, 24 and 25 March are dropped entirely and are replaced by episodes of The Simpsons.
- 26 March – ITV airs The Final Straw, an episode of The Bill in which Detective Constable Viv Martella, played by Nula Conwell, is killed off when she is shot by a man after approaching the van in which he is sitting.
- 27 March – The network television premiere on BBC1 of the 1989 American gangster comedy Harlem Nights, starring Eddie Murphy.
- 28 March – The Bluebells' 1984 single "Young at Heart" reaches number one in the UK Singles Chart following a re-release after being featured in a Volkswagen Golf advert. It tops the charts for four weeks.
- 29 March – Central becomes the first ITV region to begin showing the New Zealand medical soap opera Shortland Street.

=== April ===
- 2 April – Debut of the comedy-drama The Riff Raff Element on BBC1.
- 3 April – The 1993 Grand National, shown live on BBC1, is declared void after 30 of the 39 runners begin the race and carry on, despite there having been a false start.
- 4 April
  - Children's BBC begin to repeat the school drama Grange Hill from its first series in 1978 on Sunday mornings on BBC2, as part of the show's 15th anniversary celebrations. These repeats end in 1999 with series 16. Prior to the repeats, the US animated series Rugrats also begins airing that day.
  - The final episode of The Darling Buds of May airs on ITV.
- 5 April – The Children's Channel rebrands with a new series of idents depicting the live-action shots that shows the colours of blue, red and yellow and updates its new logo to be like the original one.
- 6 April – BBC1 airs This Is Michael Bolton, a recording of the singer in concert.
- 11 April
  - BBC1 airs The Legend of Lochnagar, a special live-action/animated short film introduced by HRH The Prince of Wales; the prince narrates this story based on the 1980 fairytale children's book, which he made up for his younger brothers, about how an old man that lives in a cave behind Balmoral Castle is taught to care for the environment.
  - Sky One airs a special clip show episode of The Simpsons, which features memorable moments from the first three seasons.
- 12 April – The network television premiere of Tony Scott's 1990 American romantic sports drama Days of Thunder on BBC1, starring Tom Cruise, Nicole Kidman and Robert Duvall.
- 13 April – A new look is introduced across all the BBC's television news bulletins with a studio that is almost entirely computer-generated and features a glass model of the Corporation's coat of arms.
- 17 April
  - After six years, six series and 179 editions, BBC1 airs the final episode of its Saturday morning children's series Going Live!.
  - Arena presents a new four-part series, "Tales of Rock 'N' Roll", on BBC2 which looks at the story of four rock songs of how they came about and the history behind them and who and what they involved. Starting with Peggy Sue who was tracked down in Sacramento, California to be found running her own drain-clearing company Rapid Rooter and then to be taken back to Lubbock, Texas to recall how she knew Buddy Holly and how her marriage to drummer Jerry Allison turned out. Heartbreak Hotel where the song came to be written after the two songwriters discovered an article about a suicide in a hotel in Miami after reading about it in the Miami Herald. Walk on the Wild Side looks at all the characters that were involved in the song and how Lou Reed used to spend time at Andy Warhol's studio where they all did drugs (Holly Woodlawn and Joe Dallesandro were the only ones still around to tell the tale) and Highway 61 Revisited which looked at Bob Dylan's roots and everything connected with U.S. Route 61. The series ran for four consecutive weeks on Saturday nights on 17 April, 24 April, 1 May, and 8 May.
- 18 April – The network television premiere of Jonathan Lynn's 1990 British madcap comedy Nuns on the Run on Channel 4, starring Eric Idle and Robbie Coltrane.
- 21 April – The Pot Noodle advertisement Computer Graphic, starring Phil Hartman, is banned for causing seizures in several viewers.
- 23 April
  - Pearson Television launches a friendly takeover bid for Thames Television, valuing the company at £99 million.
  - Episode 1681 of Neighbours, the first that does not feature the 1980s-style titles and theme music, is shown in the UK, having made its debut in Australia on 18 May 1992.

=== May ===
- 2 May – Debut of the two-part adaptation of Jilly Cooper's 1985 erotic novel Riders on ITV, starring Marcus Gilbert, Michael Praed, Arabella Tjye, Anthony Calf, Sienna Guillory, Annabel Giles, Gabrielle Beaumont and Stephanie Beacham after weeks of being trailed as "a sex sizzler". It is produced by Anglia. The second part is aired on 3 May.
- 3 May – The network television premiere of Jim McBride's 1989 American musical biographical drama Great Balls of Fire! on BBC2, starring Dennis Quaid as the legendary rock-and-roll musician Jerry Lee Lewis.
- 10 May
  - Debut on ITV of Peak Practice, which originally starred Kevin Whately, Amanda Burton and Simon Shepherd, though the roster of doctors will change many times over the course of the series.
  - Channel 4 airs Beyond Citizen Kane, a documentary film directed by Simon Hartog, produced by John Ellis and narrated by Chris Kelly. It details the dominant position of the Globo media group by founder Roberto Marinho and discusses the group's influence, power and political connections with the support of military dictatorship in Brazil.
- 11 May – BBC1's popular soap opera EastEnders is given its new title sequence which includes the updated map of London in full colour for the first time, and a brand new theme tune, introduced to give the programme a more modern feel, referred to as the "jazzy" version for its saxophone beats. The new theme tune proves rather unpopular and is replaced by a re-recorded version of the original theme the following April.
- 13 May – Peter Dean makes his final appearance as EastEnders market trader Pete Beale. The character goes on the run with an old flame with whom he has reconnected, only to discover she is married to a local gangster. Pete is killed off-screen on 16 December after the couple are killed in a car crash.
- 15 May – Ireland's Niamh Kavanagh wins the 1993 Eurovision Song Contest (staged in the Republic of Ireland) with "In Your Eyes", beating the United Kingdom's Sonia, who sang "Better the Devil You Know", by 23 points.
- 16 May – Arnold Schwarzenegger, Bruce Willis and Sylvester Stallone appear as guests on the ITV chat show Aspel & Company. The edition is later censured by the Independent Television Commission because the actors were promoting their joint business venture Planet Hollywood.
- 19 May – After ten years and ten series in its original run, the final edition of Blockbusters is broadcast on ITV. But it continues for one more series on Sky One a year later and the five ITV regions show this series until 1995. The game show will make sporadic returns on other channels, starting with a short-lived BBC version presented by Michael Aspel in 1997.
- 21 May – the final episode of the children's drama Press Gang airs on Children's ITV.
- 22 May – Stars in Their Eyes returns on ITV with new presenter Matthew Kelly who takes over the role from Leslie Crowther who is still recovering from head injuries received in a car crash the previous year. Changes to the show include a live final where viewers phone in to decide the winner of the series.
- 24 May – The final edition of the gameshow Cluedo, based on the boardgame of the same name airs on ITV.
- 26 May – Noddy's Toyland Adventures makes its Australian debut on ABC.
- 27 May – The final episode of the five-part BBC Schools French language adventure series La Marée et ses Secrets (The Tide and its Secrets) is broadcast, ending a run which began in 1984.
- 30 May – The network television premiere of Sam Raimi's 1990 American horror fantasy Darkman on BBC2 as part of the Moviedrome strand, starring Liam Neeson, Frances McDormand and Larry Drake.

=== June ===
- 1 June – S4C introduces a new series of idents which depicted inanimate objects as having characteristics of dragons as a reference to the red dragon on the flag of Wales.
- 2 June – Marcus Plantin, ITV's network director, announces the termination of Scottish soap Take the High Road from September 1993, as 'ITV's statisticians believed English audiences have had enough'. This results in public protest, as many believe that without ITV companies south of the border, the series had no chance. The issue is raised in the House of Commons under an early day motions, and the Daily Record newspaper holds a protest as well. By the end of June, Scottish Television decide to continue producing the series mainly for the Scottish market, but within a month nearly all the ITV companies reinstate it after viewers complain about the show being dropped in the first place. At this point the series is shown on the ITV network on Wednesday and Thursday afternoons except for Scottish, Grampian and Border which shows the series in peak time slots with episodes at least months ahead from the other regions.
- 4 June
  - When Roy Hattersley fails to appear on this day's edition of Have I Got News for You, the third time he has cancelled at the last minute, he is replaced with a tub of lard, credited as "The Rt. Hon. Tub of Lard MP", as it is "imbued with much the same qualities and liable to give a similar performance".
  - At 6pm, UTV unveils a new logo. A new jingle is also introduced with a distinct Celtic sound. On the same day, the extended studios at Havelock House are formally opened by presenter Gloria Hunniford.
- 6 June – The Animals of Farthing Wood makes its Irish debut on RTÉ. It airs in this country.
- 9 June – The network television premiere on ITV of Herbert Ross's 1989 American comedy drama Steel Magnolias, starring Sally Field, Dolly Parton, Shirley MacLaine, Daryl Hannah, Julia Roberts and Olympia Dukakis.
- 10 June – Les Dawson, the comedian who has presented the shows Jokers Wild, Blankety Blank and Fast Friends, dies suddenly from a heart attack during a medical check-up at a Greater Manchester hospital at the age of 62.
- 11 June – Channel 4 airs the final episodes of Cheers over three consecutive nights, finishing with the 80-minute finale on 13 June. However, due to the series popularity, repeats of the show begin the following weekend.
- 15 June – ITV announces that the ITV Telethon, due to take place next in 1994, is being scrapped, with ITV saying: "Viewers have grown tired of being asked to donate money to television charity appeals" and the "telethon format is tired and people no longer respond well to things that are old".
- 28 June – Channel 4 airs the last programmes produced for the ITV Schools strand. However, the channel continues to produce its own schools programming for several years afterwards.
- June – The BBC announces that it will freeze plans for new subscription services during its overnight downtime due to the service not being proftable. The BBC had planned up to 30 programmes but only four ever launched.

=== July ===
- 1 July – The two production companies, Tiger Television and Aspect Film and Television, merge to form Tiger Aspect Productions.
- 4 July
  - Derek Johns wins the 1993 series of MasterChef on BBC1.
  - Debut of American live-action drama Stingray on Sky One, starring Nick Mancuso and created and produced by Stephen J. Cannell (not to be confused with the earlier television series of the same name).
- 9 July – BBC1 airs the final episode of Eldorado. The soap has been axed due to poor ratings.
- 14 July – BBC1 airs the 100th edition of the daytime gameshow Turnabout_(game_show).
- 22 July – Three former cable-only channels, Discovery, The Learning Channel and Bravo, begin broadcasting on the Astra satellite, ahead of the launch of the Sky Multichannels package on 1 September.
- 22–23 July – The network television premiere of the US crime drama Stay the Night on BBC1, starring Barbara Hershey.
- 23 July – Prime Minister John Major gives an interview to ITN journalist Michael Brunson after his government wins a vote of confidence in the House of Commons earlier that day. During an unguarded moment following the interview and while still being recorded, Major refers to some of his cabinet colleagues as "Bastards". The incident which becomes known in the media as "Bastardgate", prompts the tabloid newspapers the Daily Mirror and The Sun to set up phone lines with recordings of the conversation that readers are invited to call. Both newspapers are warned to discontinue the lines by the regulatory body, the Independent Committee for the Supervision of Standards of Telephone Information Services, because it feels that broadcasting the off-air conversation is a breach of privacy.
- 24 July – The fourth series of ITV's Stars in Their Eyes concludes with the show's first live Grand Final, allowing viewers to vote for their favourite act. The series is won by Jacquii Cann, performing as Alison Moyet.
- July – The ITC publishes the findings of a technical review of the future viability of launching a fifth television channel. By October, more than 70 parties have responded to its publication, including some expressing interest in running Channel 5 should the licence be readvertised.

=== August ===
- 6 August – The network television premiere of Gore Vidal's 1989 western Billy the Kid on BBC1, starring Val Kilmer.
- 13–22 August – For the first time, British viewers are able to see full live coverage of the morning events of the World Athletics Championships. The full morning event coverage is broadcast on Eurosport, although the BBC does broadcast some live morning coverage.
- 18 August – ITV airs 15: The Life and Death of Philip Knight, Peter Kosminsky's drama-documentary film about a teenage man who took his own life in his cell at Swansea adult prison on 13 July 1990.
- 20 August – The network television premiere of the 1990 action comedy Heart Condition on BBC1, starring Bob Hoskins and Denzel Washington.
- 26 August – June Brown makes her last appearance in EastEnders as Dot Cotton prior to her return in 1997.
- 27 August – BBC1 airs a special live edition of Challenge Anneka in which Anneka Rice returns to some of the projects the show worked on to check on their progress.
- 29 August
  - The network television premiere of Steven Spielberg's 1989 bittersweet romantic fantasy Always on BBC1, starring Richard Dreyfuss, Holly Hunter, John Goodman and Audrey Hepburn in her final on-screen appearance.
  - The final episode of The $64,000 Question airs on ITV.
  - Larry Peerce's 1988 biographical television movie Elvis and Me airs on ITV, based on 1985 book of the same name starring Dale Midkiff as Elvis and Susan Walters as Priscilla Presley.
- 30 August – The network television premiere of the 1990 live-action adventure Teenage Mutant Ninja Turtles, a film based on the popular series known in the UK as Teenage Mutant Hero Turtles.

=== September ===
- 1 September
  - Sky Multichannels launches. Consequently, many satellite channels, including Sky One and UK Gold, are now only viewable on satellite as part of a pay television package. At the same time, new idents launch on Sky's main channels.
  - Three new channels launch – The Family Channel, Nickelodeon UK and UK Living and all three join the Sky Multichannels package. The Family Channel shares space with The Children's Channel which now ends its day two hours earlier, at 5pm.
- 2 September – Last network screening of Take the High Road. From the following week, the series will be screened at different times and days by most ITV regions after viewer complaints about it being taken off English channels. Carlton resumes the series in October and Central follows a month later; only Yorkshire and Tyne Tees refuse to reinstate the series, although they bring it back in 1996. The Scottish ITV regions continue showing the series on primetime as normal.,
- 5 September
  - Debut of Karen Arthur's 1992 biographical miniseries The Jacksons: An American Dream on ITV, focusing on the Jackson family and its popular Motown pop group. The second part airs on 8 September.
  - The network television premiere of Garry Marshall's 1990 romantic comedy Pretty Woman airs on ITV, starring Richard Gere and Julia Roberts.
- 6 September
  - UK Gold introduces a new ident with the form-up of the first logo against a silky blue background, replacing the original 'Goldie' idents.
  - Debut of the trolley-dash game show Supermarket Sweep on ITV, presented by Dale Winton.
  - Debut of the children's series Sooty & Co. on CITV, starring Matthew Corbett.
  - Anne Robinson makes her debut as presenter of Watchdog on BBC1.
- 10 September – BBC2 begins showing the late-night Horror double bill movie series Dr. Terror's Vault of Horror, hosted by "Dr Walpurgis", played by Guy Henry. The first films shown are the 1986 comedy horror film Vamp, starring Grace Jones and the 1960 gothic horror The Mask of Satan.
- 11 September
  - The network television premiere of Robert Zemeckis' 1989 time-travel sequel Back to the Future: Part II on BBC1, starring Michael J. Fox, Christopher Lloyd, Lea Thompson, Thomas F. Wilson and Elisabeth Shue.
  - Sky One moves E Street from its weekday early evening slot to a weekend daytime slot where it is shown in hour-long episodes on Saturdays from 6pm to 7pm and Sundays from 1pm to 2pm. The weekday 6:30pm slot is used to air episodes of Paradise Beach, but E Street is restored to the weekday slot in January 1994 after the move proves to be unpopular.
- 12 September
  - The biographical drama miniseries Sinatra makes its debut on ITV which focuses on the life of the legendary singer and actor Frank Sinatra and stars Philip Casnoff, Olympia Dukakis, Joe Santos, Gina Gershon and Rod Steiger. The concluding part is aired on 13 September.
  - BBC1 airs A Foreign Field as part of the Screen One strand starring Alec Guinness, Lauren Bacall, Leo McKern and Jeanne Moreau. It is directed by Charles Sturridge and features an ensemble cast of American, Australian, British and French stars and its title evokes Rupert Brooke's 1915 poem "The Soldier".
- 16 September – The network television premiere of Die Hard 2: Die Harder on ITV, starring Bruce Willis, Bonnie Bedelia, Dennis Franz and Reginald VelJohnson.
- 17 September – Cartoon Network and classic movie channel TNT launch in the UK. They share the same transponder with Cartoon Network broadcasting during the day and TNT broadcasting during the evening and overnight. The channels are free-to-air on satellite and are not part of the Sky Multichannels package.
- 19 September
  - The network television premiere of Peter Weir's 1989 teen drama Dead Poets Society on ITV, starring Robin Williams.
  - Channel 4 airs Blue, a drama film directed by Derek Jarman who is partially blind and only able to see in shades of blue. BBC Radio 3 also broadcasts the film simultaneously so that viewers could hear the soundtrack in stereo.
- 20 September
  - The educational numeracy series Numbertime makes its debut on BBC2.
  - Channel 4 Schools launches, replacing the former ITV Schools service that had previously run on Channel 4 since 1987.
- 21 September – BBC1 airs A Murderer's Game, an edition of the Crimewatch File series looking at the 1992 hunt for the kidnapper of the Birmingham estate agent Stephanie Slater.
- 22 September
  - The game show Lose A Million makes its debut on ITV, presented by Chris Tarrant with a voiceover by Honor Blackman, in which contestants win a total of £1 million and attempt to lose as many of them as possible by answering questions incorrectly. It is axed on 1 December, lasting only a single series.
  - Children's ITV debuts Old Bear Stories and Avenger Penguins, the former will go on to win a BAFTA award for Best Children's Programme.
  - BBC1 airs Hostage, an edition of the Inside Story strand, in which Terry Waite speaks about his years of captivity in Beirut.
- 23 September – Debut of the popular children's educational series Come Outside on BBC2, starring Lynda Baron as Auntie Mabel alongside her dog Pippin.
- 24 September
  - The animated series Philbert Frog makes its debut on BBC1.
  - Channel 4 debuts the late night magazine topical programme Eurotrash, presented by Antoine de Caunes and Jean-Paul Gaultier, with narrative voiceovers by British comic actress Maria McErlane. The show features a comical review of unusual topics mainly from Western and Central Europe, with all intellectual property rights to the series controlled by the production company Rapido TV.
- 27 September – Strike It Lucky returns to ITV for its ninth series. Due to the loss of its franchise, the show is now produced by Thames in association with Central.
- September – Scottish Television reschedules Emmerdale from 7pm to 5.10pm and uses the slot to broadcast daily regional programmes, including Take the High Road. This arrangement continues until early 1998 when Emmerdale is moved back to its original slot.
- September–October – Channel 4 broadcasts live coverage of the Professional Chess Association version of the World Chess Championship 1993. Two hours of coverage are broadcast for each match. This is the first time that live chess has been broadcast in the UK.

=== October ===
- 1 October – QVC launches, becoming the first shopping channel in the UK. The channel had originally launched in the US in 1986.
- 2 October
  - The Saturday morning children's series Live & Kicking makes its debut on BBC1, presented by Andi Peters, Emma Forbes and John Barrowman.
  - Super Channel is renamed as the NBC Super Channel following it being taken over by the US company General Electric, at this time parent of the NBC network.
  - The US superhero series Mighty Morphin Power Rangers makes its UK debut on Sky One.
- 19 October – The last on-screen appearance of Roly, the EastEnders dog and Queen Vic resident who has been part of the soap since the first episode. The episode featuring his demise attracted an audience of 14.8 million viewers. The dog who played Roly dies during a heatwave on 2 August 1995.
- 20 October
  - Final edition of snooker series Pot Black as a standalone programme shown on BBC1 in which Steve Davis beat Mike Hallett to win the title for the fourth time. It would return in 2005 as part of Grandstand which featured all matches on the show.
  - Debut of Thatcher: The Downing Street Years, a four-part BBC1 series looking at the premiership of Margaret Thatcher.
  - Kirsty Wark makes her debut as anchor on BBC2's Newsnight.
  - The Independent Television Commission issues Channel 4 with a formal warning for an episode of the soap Brookside which aired on 7 and 8 May that depicted a wife stabbing her abusive husband to death.
- 21 October – Channel 4 is granted permission by the High Court to show excerpts from Stanley Kubrick's controversial 1971 film A Clockwork Orange as part of its Without Walls series. The film Forbidden Fruit, is shown on 26 October. Time Warner had sought to prevent Channel 4 from showing scenes from the film which has been banned in the UK since 1973 after Kubrick withdrew it amid concerns it was encouraging violence; the ban is lifted in the year 2000, a year after Kubrick's death.
- 29 October – The final episode of the game show Every Second Counts airs on BBC1.
- 30 October – Catchphrase returns to ITV for its ninth series, the last to be produced by TVS having been filmed the previous year.

=== November ===
- 2 November – Prime Minister John Major announces a review of the 1988 broadcasting voice ban, telling the House of Commons that broadcasters are stretching it "to the limit and perhaps beyond".
- 7 November – The US animated series based on the popular Sega video game Adventures of Sonic the Hedgehog makes its debut on Channel 4, two months after its US debut.
- 8 November – The first advert for an undertaker's is broadcast during an early evening episode of the Scottish soap opera Take the High Road on ITV.
- 9 November
  - It'll Never Work?, a children's series showcasing new inventions and developments in scientific technology, makes its debut on BBC1.
  - The network television premiere of Paul Verhoeven's 1990 science-fiction action thriller Total Recall on ITV, starring Arnold Schwarzenegger, Sharon Stone, Rachel Ticotin, Michael Ironside and Ronny Cox.
- 14 November – A Sunday morning repeat showing of the previous evening's Match of the Day is shown for the first time on BBC1 featuring the first round of the FA Cup, It will only broadcast on FA Cup weekends other than the semi-finals and final for the first few seasons.
- 16 November – Patsy Palmer makes her EastEnders debut as the long-running character Bianca Jackson.
- 18 November
  - Several schoolchildren are killed in a minibus crash on the M40. The incident is carried as the lead story on ITV's Early Evening News and News at Ten, while the BBC's Nine O'Clock News carries it as the third item, behind the State Opening of Parliament and a piece about the Troubles. The BBC's decision to put the item third attracts strong criticism from other journalists who question the reasoning behind it and accuse the BBC for being out of touch.
  - The time-travelling sitcom Goodnight Sweetheart makes its debut on BBC1, starring Nicholas Lyndhurst, Michelle Holmes, Dervla Kirwan and Victor McGuire.
- 19 November – Channel 4 airs the first "Late Licence" which is shown on Friday and Saturday nights until around 5am. The first "Late Licence" is presented by Smashie and Nicey with the strand showing repeats of the channel's programmes such as editions of The Word.
- 20 November –
  - Leslie Crowther makes his first appearance since his accident on The Royal Variety Performance, appearing alongside Cilla Black.
  - The music video for Mr Blobby premieres on Noel’s House Party on BBC1.
- 22 November – On the 30th anniversary of the assassination of John F. Kennedy, Channel 4 airs the documentary As It Happened: The Killing of Kennedy which gives a minute-by-minute account of the events of 22 November 1963 with contributions from scores of eyewitnesses.
- 23 November – 30th anniversary of the first broadcast of Doctor Who.
- 26–27 November – BBC1 airs the two-part Doctor Who special Dimensions in Time, a crossover with EastEnders. The episode is part of the 1993 Children in Need appeal and is the first new Doctor Who episode since the series ended in December 1989.
- 29 November
  - The final edition of The Krypton Factor is broadcast on ITV after 16 years. It returns in 1995 with co-host Penny Smith and is briefly revived in 2009 and 2010 presented by Ben Shephard.
  - The three-part dramatisation of Carol Clewlow's 1989 erotic novel A Woman's Guide to Adultery makes its debut on ITV, starring Amanda Donohoe, Theresa Russell, Adrian Dunbar and Sean Bean. The serial concludes on 13 December.

=== December ===
- 5 December
  - "Mr Blobby", a novelty song inspired by the Noel's House Party character of the same name, tops the UK Singles Chart. After being replaced a week later by Take That's "Babe", the song returns to the top to become the 1993 Christmas number one.
  - The pilot episode for the comedy talk show Mrs Merton is shown by Granada Television with the titular character played by Caroline Aherne. It will be picked up for a full series on BBC2 in 1995.
- 6 December – ITV's North West England franchise holder Granada launches a hostile takeover for London Weekend Television, worth £600million. The takeover bid comes about because of the relaxation of the rules governing the network. LWT tries to outstep the takeover bid by initiating talks with Yorkshire Television and Scottish Television.
- 9 December – Peter Sissons hosts his last edition of Question Time, having chaired the show since 1989.
- 13 December – The Times reports that a conflict of words has broken out between London Weekend Television and Granada over LWT's talks with Yorkshire Television. Granada claims the YTV-LWT deal is "something cobbled together by desperate men". Gerry Robinson, the Chairman of Granada plc is dismissive of the deal, especially since Yorkshire has made a £10million loss and is already paying much of its revenue to the government. Reports also suggest if LWT bid for Yorkshire Television it would also form an alliance with Anglia who would takeover Tyne Tees Television.
- 18 December – BBC2 broadcasts the Arena special "Radio Night", an ambitious simulcast with BBC Radio 4.
- 21 December – The Marcopolo 1 satellite is sold to Sweden's Nordic Satellite AB and is renamed Sirius 1.
- 22 December – Plato's Stepchildren, an episode of the US science-fiction series Star Trek, is shown on British television for the first time, having been banned by the BBC in 1971 during the series’ original run.
- 24 December
  - Christmas Eve highlights on BBC1 include the network television premiere of the 1990 espionage thriller The Hunt for Red October, starring Sean Connery and Alec Baldwin.
  - ITV screen two Christmas Eve network premiere's; the 1989 family Christmas comedy film National Lampoon's Christmas Vacation, starring Chevy Chase and the 1989 Kevin Costner baseball fantasy drama film Field of Dreams.
  - Edward Tudor-Pole succeeds Richard O'Brien as presenter on The Crystal Maze on Channel 4.
- 25 December
  - Christmas Day highlights on BBC1 include the network television premieres of the time-travel sequel Back to the Future: Part III with Michael J Fox and Christopher Lloyd and the smash hit romantic fantasy Ghost starring Patrick Swayze and Demi Moore.
  - Channel 4 airs its first Alternative Christmas message. The broadcast features a contemporary, often controversial celebrity, delivering a message in the manner of The Queen. The first alternative message is delivered by Quentin Crisp.
- 26 December
  - Boxing Day highlights on BBC1 include the films Superman III and The Outlaw Josey Wales.
  - The Wrong Trousers, the second short film starring Wallace and Gromit, makes its debut on BBC2, featuring the voice of Peter Sallis as Wallace.
- 27 December
  - Channel 4 airs Prince Cinders, a short animated film based on a book by children's author and illustrator Babette Cole. The film features the voices of well known stars such as Dexter Fletcher, Jonathan Ross, Jim Broadbent, Jennifer Saunders and Craig Charles, as well as two original songs performed by singer Miriam Stockley and comedian Lenny Henry.
  - The pilot episode for the comedy panel game show Shooting Stars is broadcast on BBC2, presented by Vic Reeves and Bob Mortimer. It will return for a full series in 1995.
- 30 December
  - The Times reports that Granada has increased its takeover bid for LWT to £658million.
  - Episodes of Emmerdale featuring the controversial plane crash storyline begin airing on ITV. The storyline was developed to win higher ratings for the series which has been threatened with cancellation due to low viewing figures. However, although it succeeds in turning around the fortunes of the series, ITV received many complaints about the timing of the story which comes shortly after the fifth anniversary of the Lockerbie disaster.
- 31 December
  - The first edition of the Scottish football-themed comedy sketch show Only an Excuse? is broadcast on BBC1 Scotland; it is subsequently aired each Hogmanay.
  - BBC2 airs the first Hootenanny, an annual New Year's Eve music show hosted by Jools Holland. The first edition includes performances from Sting, the Gipsy Kings and Sly and Robbie.

== Debuts ==
=== BBC1 ===
- 3 January – Breakfast with Frost (1993–2005)
- 5 January – First Letter First (1993)
- 6 January
  - The Animals of Farthing Wood (1993–1995)
  - Fame in the 20th Century (1993)
  - The Adventures of Buzzy Bee and Friends (1993)
  - The Return of the Psammead (1993)
- 7 January – Joking Apart (1993–1995)
- 10 January – Gallowglass (1993)
- 27 January – The Detectives (1993–1997)
- 28 January – Chef! (1993–1996)
- 15 February – Bonjour la Classe (1993)
- 17 February – Century Falls (1993)
- 28 February – A Year in Provence (1993)
- 9 March – Luv (1993–1994)
- 28 March – You, Me and It (1993)
- 2 April – The Riff Raff Element (1993–1994)
- 10 April – Westbeach (1993)
- 22 April – Sylvania Waters (1993)
- 27 May – Every Silver Lining (1993)
- 6 June – Lady Chatterley (1993)
- 15 July – The Leaving of Liverpool (1993)
- 17 July – McGee and Me! (1989–1995)
- 7 September – Tales of the Tooth Fairies (1992)
- 13 September – Albert the 5th Musketeer (1993)
- 18 September
  - Happy Families (1993)
  - Harry (1993–1995)
- 21 September – The Smell of Reeves and Mortimer (1993–1995)
- 24 September – Philbert Frog (1993)
- 25 September – Marlene Marlowe Investigates (1993–1994)
- 27 September – The Greedysaurus Gang (1993)
- 30 September – The Adventures of Blinky Bill (1994)
- 2 October – Live & Kicking (1993–2001)
- 19 October – Children's Hospital (1993–2003)
- 31 October – Scarlet and Black (1993)
- 9 November – It'll Never Work? (1993–1999)
- 11 November
  - If You See God, Tell Him (1993)
  - The Boot Street Band (1993)
- 15 November
  - Mortimer and Arabel (1993–1994)
  - Goodnight Sweetheart (1993–1999)
- 18 November – Life in the Freezer (1993)
- 21 November – To Play the King (1993)
- 29 November – Doctor Who: Thirty Years in the TARDIS (1993)
- 8 December – Stark (1993)
- 30 December – Health and Efficiency (1993–1995)
- 31 December – Only an Excuse? (1993–2020)

=== BBC2 ===
- 7 January – Joking Apart (1993–1995)
- 12 January – Magic Grandad (1993–2009)
- 19 January – The Ark (1993) (documentary series)
- 3 February – The Mushroom Picker (1993)
- 24 February – Mr Wroe's Virgins (1993)
- 7 March – The Living Soap (1993)
- 24 March
  - Goggle-Eyes (1993)
  - I, Lovett (1993)
- 31 March – Burke's Backyard (1987–2004)
- 4 April – Rugrats (1991–1995, 1996–2004)
- 1 May – Olly's Prison (1993)
- 4 June – One Foot in the Past (1993–2000)
- 13 July – Far Flung Floyd (1993)
- 22 July – No Stilettos (1993)
- 1 September – Love and Reason (1993)
- 20 September
  - Newman and Baddiel in Pieces (1993)
  - Numbertime (1993–2001)
- 23 September – Come Outside (1993–1997)
- 6 October – Seinfeld (1989–1998)
- 10 October – Dr. Terror's Vault of Horror (1993–1996)
- 22 October – The Larry Sanders Show (1992–1998)
- 3 November – The Buddha of Suburbia (1993)
- 14 November – The Return of the Borrowers (1993)
- 15 November – Consuming Passions (1992–2001)
- 5 December – The Mrs Merton Show (1993–1998)
- 8 December – Stark (1993)
- 26 December – The Wrong Trousers (1993)
- 27 December – Shooting Stars (1993–1997, 2002, 2008–2011)

=== ITV ===
- 1 January – GMTV (1993–2010)
- 2 January
  - Unnatural Causes (1993)
  - Saturday Disney (1993–1996)
  - The Little Picture Show (1993–1995)
- 3 January
  - The Man Who Cried (1993)
- 4 January
  - Meridian Tonight (1993–present)
  - Harry's Mad (1993–1996)
  - Tots TV (1993–1998)
  - Westcountry Live (1993–2009)
  - London Tonight (1993–present)
- 5 January
  - Full Stretch (1993)
  - Oasis (1993)
  - Wizadora (1993–1998)
- 8 January
  - ZZZap! (1993–2001)
  - Eye of the Storm (1993)
- 9 January
  - Speaking our Language (1993–1996)
  - Tracey Ullman: A Class Act (1993)
- 10 January — Anna Lee (1993–1994)
- 11 January –
  - Head over Heels (1993)
  - The Good Sex Guide (1993–1996)
- 17 February – Three Seven Eleven (1993–1994)
- 23 February – The 10 Percenters (1993–1996)
- 1 March – September Song (1993–1995)
- 5 March – Doctor Finlay (1993–1996)
- 8 March – A Statement of Affairs (1993)
- 9 March – The Brighton Belles (1993–1994)
- 29 March – Shortland Street (1992–present)
- 6 April – The Sherman Plays (1993–1997)
- 7 April – The Lodge (1993)
- 8 April
  - Body & Soul (1993)
  - Just a Gigolo (1993)
- 9 April – The Gingerbread Girl (1993)
- 16 April – Conjugal Rites (1993–1994)
- 25 April – Seekers (1993)
- 2 May – Riders (1993)
- 5 May – Sharpe (1993–1997, 2006–2008)
- 9 May – Harnessing Peacocks (1993)
- 10 May – Peak Practice (1993–2002)
- 20 May – Rik Mayall Presents (Anthology – 6 episodes: Micky Love, Briefest Encounter, Dancing Queen, The Big One, Dirty Old Town and Clair de Lune) (1993)
- 21 May – Strange but True? (1993–1997)
- 28 May – Dr. Quinn, Medicine Woman (1993–1998)
- 10 June – Telltale (1993)
- 29 June – Rubbish, King of the Jumble (1993–1994)
- 3 July – Time After Time (1993–1995)
- 7 July – What You Lookin' At? (1993)
- 8 July – Michael Ball (1993–1995)
- 11 July – Over the Rainbow (1993)
- 12 July – Frank Stubbs Promotes (1993–1994)
- 27 July – Kyle Again (1993–1994)
- 7 August – Wycliffe (1993–1998)
- 18 August – 15: The Life and Death of Philip Knight (1993)
- 6 September
  - Dale's Supermarket Sweep (1993–2001, 2007)
  - Sooty & Co. (1993–1998)
- 10 September
  - The Legends of Treasure Island (1993–1995)
  - Alphabet Castle (1993–1995)
- 22 September
  - Old Bear Stories (1993–1997)
  - Avenger Penguins (1993–1994)
  - Lose A Million (1993)
- 27 September – Cracker (1993–1996, 2006)
- 15 October – Demob (1993)
- 16 October – Circles of Deceit (1993; 1995–1996)
- 21 October – All in the Game (1993)
- 2 November – Hurricanes (1993–1997)
- 4 November – Wolf It (1993–1996)
- 14 November – SeaQuest DSV (1993–1996)
- 29 November – A Woman's Guide to Adultery (1993)
- 3 December – All or Nothing at All (1993)
- Unknown
  - Goof Troop (1992–1993)
  - Darkwing Duck (1991–1992)

=== Channel 4 ===
- 2 January – Spiff and Hercules (1989)
- 3 January – Hammerman (1992)
- 4 January – Lift Off (1992–1995)
- 21 February – Lipstick on Your Collar (1993)
- 27 February – Fourways Farm (1993–1996)
- 23 March – Eerie, Indiana (1991–1993)
- 6 June – Comics (1993)
- 12 June – The Legend of White Fang (1992–1994)
- 6 July – An Exchange of Fire (1993)
- 10 July – California Dreams (1993–1996)
- 13 July – The Adventures of T-Rex (1992–1993)
- 25 August – Mr Don & Mr George (1993)
- 24 September – Eurotrash (1993–2004)
- 28 September – Tales of the City (1993; 1998)
- 17 October – Wild West C.O.W.-Boys of Moo Mesa (1992–1997)
- 31 October
  - King Arthur and the Knights of Justice (1993)
  - Popeye and Son (1993–2003)
- 2 November – Closing Numbers (1993)
- 7 November – Adventures of Sonic the Hedgehog (1993)
- 27 December – Prince Cinders (1993)
- 29 December – Who Dealt? (1993)
- 30 December – Jo Brand Through the Cakehole (1993–1996)

=== Sky One ===
- 20 January – The Round Table (1992)
- 14 February – Diana: Her True Story (1993)
- 1 March – Games World (1993–1998)
- 2 May – The Young Indiana Jones Chronicles (1992–1993)
- 10 June – Eddie Dodd (1991)
- 4 July – Stingray (1985–1987)
- 20 July – Civil Wars (1991–1993)
- 4 August – Picket Fences (1992–1996)
- 15 August – Star Trek: Deep Space Nine (1993–1999)
- 6 September – Paradise Beach (1993)
- 7 September – Moomin (1990)
- 2 October
  - X-Men (1992–1997)
  - Mighty Morphin Power Rangers (1993–1995)
- 31 October – Bloodlines: Murder in the Family (1993)
- 14 November – The Sands of Time (1992)
- 21 November – JFK: Reckless Youth (1993)

=== Nickelodeon UK ===
- 6 November – Rocko's Modern Life (1993–1996)

== Channels ==
=== New channels ===
| Date | Channel |
|---|---|
| 1 September | The Family Channel |
| 1 September | Nickelodeon |
| 1 September | UK Living |
| 17 September | Cartoon Network |
| 17 September | TNT |
| 1 October | QVC |

=== Defunct channels ===
| Date | Channel |
|---|---|
| 24 January | Lifestyle |
| 24 January | Lifestyle Satellite Jukebox |
| 1 March | Screensport |

=== Rebranded channels ===
| Date | Old Name | New Name |
|---|---|---|
| 1 September | Sky Movies Plus | Sky Movies |
| 2 October | Super Channel | NBC Super Channel |

== Television shows ==
=== Returning this year after a break of one year or longer ===
- Celebrity Squares (1975–1979, 1993–1997, 2014–2015)
- The Inspector Alleyn Mysteries (1990, 1993–1994)

== Continuing television shows ==
=== 1920s ===
- BBC Wimbledon (1927–1939, 1946–2019, 2021–present)

=== 1930s ===
- Trooping the Colour (1937–1939, 1946–2019, 2023–present)
- The Boat Race (1938–1939, 1946–2019, 2021–present)
- BBC Cricket (1939, 1946–1999, 2020–2024)

=== 1940s ===
- Come Dancing (1949–1998)

=== 1950s ===
- Panorama (1953–present)
- What the Papers Say (1956–2008)
- The Sky at Night (1957–present)
- Blue Peter (1958–present)
- Grandstand (1958–2007)

=== 1960s ===
- Coronation Street (1960–present)
- Songs of Praise (1961–present)
- World in Action (1963–1998)
- Top of the Pops (1964–2006)
- Match of the Day (1964–present)
- Mr. and Mrs. (1965–1999)
- Jackanory (1965–1996, 2006)
- Sportsnight (1965–1997)
- Call My Bluff (1965–2005)
- The Money Programme (1966–2010)

=== 1970s ===
- Emmerdale (1972–present)
- Newsround (1972–present)
- Pebble Mill (1972–1986, 1991–1996)
- Last of the Summer Wine (1973–2010)
- That's Life! (1973–1994)
- Wish You Were Here...? (1974–2003)
- Arena (1975–present)
- Jim'll Fix It (1975–1994)
- One Man and His Dog (1976–present)
- Grange Hill (1978–2008)
- Ski Sunday (1978–present)
- The Paul Daniels Magic Show (1979–1994)
- Antiques Roadshow (1979–present)
- Question Time (1979–present)

=== 1980s ===
- Family Fortunes (1980–2002, 2006–2015, 2020–present)
- Children in Need (1980–present)
- Danger Mouse (1981–1992, 2015–2019)
- Timewatch (1982–present)
- Brookside (1982–2003)
- Countdown (1982–present)
- Right to Reply (1982–2001)
- First Tuesday (1983–1993)
- Highway (1983–1993)
- Blockbusters (1983–93, 1994–95, 1997, 2000–01, 2012, 2019)
- Spitting Image (1984–1996)
- Surprise Surprise (1984–2001, 2012–2015)
- The Bill (1984–2010)
- Channel 4 Racing (1984–2016)
- Thomas the Tank Engine & Friends (1984–present)
- Busman's Holiday (1985–1993)
- EastEnders (1985–present)
- The Cook Report (1987–1999)
- Crosswits (1985–1998)
- Screen Two (1985–1998)
- Telly Addicts (1985–1998)
- Blind Date (1985–2003, 2017–2019)
- Comic Relief (1985–present)
- ScreenPlay (1986–1993)
- Beadle's About (1986–1996)
- The Chart Show (1986–1998, 2008–2009)
- Equinox (1986–2006)
- The Really Wild Show (1986–2006)
- Casualty (1986–present)
- Every Second Counts (1986–1993)
- Lovejoy (1986–1994)
- The Raggy Dolls (1986–1994)
- Allsorts (1987–1995)
- Going Live! (1987–1993)
- Watching (1987–1993)
- Going for Gold (1987–1996, 2008–2009)
- The Time, The Place (1987–1998)
- Chain Letters (1987–1997)
- ChuckleVision (1987–2009)
- Count Duckula (1988–1993)
- You Rang, M'Lord? (1988–1993)
- You Bet! (1988–1997)
- Playdays (1988–1997)
- Wheel of Fortune (1988–2001)
- London's Burning (1988–2002)
- On the Record (1988–2002)
- Fifteen to One (1988–2003, 2013–2019)
- This Morning (1988–present)
- Fun House (1989–1999)
- Absolutely (1989–1993)
- KYTV (1989–1993)
- Press Gang (1989–1993)
- Birds of a Feather (1989–1998, 2014–2020)
- A Bit of Fry & Laurie (1989–1995)
- Byker Grove (1989–2006)
- Desmond's (1989–1994)
- Bodger & Badger (1989–1999)
- Children's Ward (1989–2000)
- Mike and Angelo (1989–2000)

=== 1990s ===
- The $64,000 Question (1990–1993)
- Families (1990–1993)
- Jeeves and Wooster (1990–1993)
- Waiting for God (1990–1994)
- Mr. Bean (1990–1995)
- The Crystal Maze (1990–1995, 2016–2020)
- Keeping Up Appearances (1990–1995)
- Turnabout (1990–1996)
- The Upper Hand (1990–1996)
- Drop the Dead Donkey (1990–1998)
- One Foot in the Grave (1990–2000)
- MasterChef (1990–2001, 2005–present)
- How 2 (1990–2006)
- Stars in Their Eyes (1990–2006, 2015)
- The Dreamstone (1990–1995)
- Rosie and Jim (1990–2000)
- Big Break (1991–2002)
- The Darling Buds of May (1991–1993)
- Spender (1991–1993)
- The House of Eliott (1991–1994)
- The Brittas Empire (1991–1997)
- Bottom (1991–1995)
- Soldier Soldier (1991–1997)
- Noel's House Party (1991–1999)
- 2point4 Children (1991–1999)
- Darkwing Duck (1991–1992)
- Little Dracula (1991–1999)
- Where's Wally?: The Animated Series (1991)
- GamesMaster (1992–1998)
- Heartbeat (1992–2010)
- Men Behaving Badly (1992–1998)
- The Big Breakfast (1992–2002)
- 999 (1992–2003)

== Ending this year ==
- Blockbusters (1983–1993, 1994–1995, 1997, 2000–2001, 2012, 2019)
- First Tuesday (1983–1993)
- Highway (1983–1993)
- Henry's Cat (1983–1993)
- Busman's Holiday (1985–1993)
- ScreenPlay (1986–1993)
- Every Second Counts (1986–1993)
- Going Live! (1987–1993)
- Runway (1987–1993)
- Watching (1987–1993)
- Count Duckula (1988–1993)
- You Rang, M'Lord? (1988–1993)
- I, Lovett (1989–1993)
- Absolutely (1989–1993)
- KYTV (1989–1993)
- Press Gang (1989–1993)
- Rolf's Cartoon Club (1989–1993)
- The $64,000 Question (1990–1993)
- Jeeves and Wooster (1990–1993)
- Uncle Jack (1990–1993)
- Families (1990–1993)
- The Darling Buds of May (1991–1993)
- The Full Wax (1991–1993)
- Radio Roo (1991–1993)
- Spider (1991–1993)
- Spender (1991–1993)
- Eldorado (1992–1993)
- Funnybones (1992–1993)
- Grace & Favour (1992–1993)
- The Good Guys (1992–1993)
- The Music Game (1992–1993)

== Births ==
- 10 January – Jacob Scipio, actor
- 22 January – Tommy Knight, actor
- 27 January – Freddy Carter, actor
- 8 March – Stephanie Davis, actress
- 11 March – Jodie Comer, actress
- 19 June – KSI, media personality
- 25 June – Barney Clark, actor
- 29 August – Liam Payne, singer (d. 2024)
- 23 November – Isabel Hodgins, actress

== Deaths ==
| Date | Name | Age | Cinematic Credibility |
|---|---|---|---|
| 2 February | Bernard Braden | 76 | actor and comedian |
| 9 February | Bill Grundy | 69 | television presenter |
| 13 February | Willoughby Gray | 76 | actor (Howards' Way) |
| 18 February | Jacqueline Hill | 63 | actress (Doctor Who) |
| 18 February | Leslie Norman | 81 | television director |
| 28 February | Joyce Carey | 94 | actress |
| 7 March | Patricia Lawrence | 67 | actress |
| 9 April | Jess Yates | 74 | television presenter (Stars on Sunday) |
| 6 May | Ann Todd | 83 | actress |
| 10 June | Les Dawson | 62 | comedian (The Les Dawson Show) and television presenter (Blankety Blank) |
| 11 June | Bernard Bresslaw | 59 | actor and comedian |
| 22 June | Victor Maddern | 65 | actor (The Dick Emery Show) |
| 11 August | Philip Martell | 86 | theme tune composer |
| 18 August | Tony Barwick | 59 | scriptwriter |
| 24 August | George Cansdale | 83 | television presenter |
| 31 August | Stuart Latham | 81 | television producer (Coronation Street) |
| 2 September | Eric Berry | 80 | actor |
| 12 September | Harold Innocent | 60 | actor |
| 20 September | Leonard Parkin | 64 | newsreader |
| 7 October | Cyril Cusack | 82 | actor |
| 10 October | John Bindon | 50 | actor (Z-Cars, Softly, Softly: Task Force) |
| 12 October | Patrick Holt | 81 | actor (Dixon of Dock Green, Crown Court, Shabby Tiger, Emmerdale) |
| 5 November | Michael Bilton | 73 | actor (To the Manor Born, Waiting For God) |
| 9 November | Stanley Myers | 63 | theme tune composer |
| 21 November | Richard Wordsworth | 78 | actor |
| 28 November | Kenneth Connor | 75 | actor ('Allo 'Allo!) |
| 1 December | Lynette Davies | 45 | actress |

== See also ==
- 1993 in British music
- 1993 in British radio
- 1993 in the United Kingdom
- List of British films of 1993
