= Lord Watson =

Lord Watson may refer to:

- William Watson, Baron Watson (1827–1899), Scottish lawyer and Conservative politician
- Mike Watson, Baron Watson of Invergowrie (born 1949), Labour politician
- Alan Watson, Baron Watson of Richmond (born 1941), broadcaster and Liberal Democrat politician
- Tom Watson, Baron Watson of Wyre Forest (born 1967), Deputy Leader of the Labour Party from 2015 to 2019
