= Olive Shapley =

British radio producer and broadcaster

- Olive Shapley, c. 1949
- Born: 10 April 1910; Peckham, London
- Died: 13 March 1999 (aged 88); Rhayader, Powys, Wales
- Education: St Hugh's College, Oxford
- Occupations: Radio/TV producer, Broadcaster
- Employer: BBC
- Known for: Presenter, Woman's Hour
- Spouses: John Salt (1939–1947); Christopher Gorton (1952–1959)

Olive Mary Shapley (10 April 1910 in Peckham, London – 13 March 1999 in Powys, Wales) was a British radio producer and broadcaster whose use of field recordings in Northern England in the 1930s and 1940s resulted in some of the earliest instances of highlighting everyday working people's voices on English radio.

== Early life ==
Olive Shapley was born Peckham, south London, into a Unitarian family. Her parents named her after the South African author Olive Schreiner.

In 1929 Shapley went to read history at St Hugh's College, Oxford. There she met her lifelong friend Barbara Betts, the future Labour politician Barbara Castle; the two women spent their holidays together and shared an interest in politics. Shapley was attracted to communism, prompted by a probable relationship with fellow student Sajjad Zaheer, and she joined the communist student organisation the October Club. Although her involvement in communist politics was short-lived, it attracted the interest of the security services, who continued to monitor her for most of her life. Castle recalled that she recognised in Olive "a fellow rebel against the sexist conventions of the Oxford of the 1920s".

== Career ==
After a brief period working for the Workers' Educational Association and teaching at several schools, she joined the BBC in 1934 as an organiser of Children's Hour programming at BBC Manchester, there she soon developed an interest in documentary features as an assistant producer. During a live programme called Men Talking, Shapley had to use placards requesting Durham miners "not say bugger or bloody", one incident of several which persuaded BBC Director General Sir John Reith to insist on broadcasts being scripted.

Using a recording van, weighing "seven tons when fully loaded", Shapley recorded actuality, which was innovative at the time, but the broadcast of swear words could now be avoided. She thought a claim by Paddy Scannell and David Cardiff that she was an innovator as being expressed in "very flattering terms".

With Joan Littlewood in 1939 she created The Classic Soil (the programme still exists) which compared the social conditions of the day with those observed a century earlier by Friedrich Engels. Decades later, Shapley thought it "probably the most unfair and biased programme ever put out by the BBC". Other programmes from this period included the features Steel (1937), Cotton and Wool (both 1939).

=== New York ===
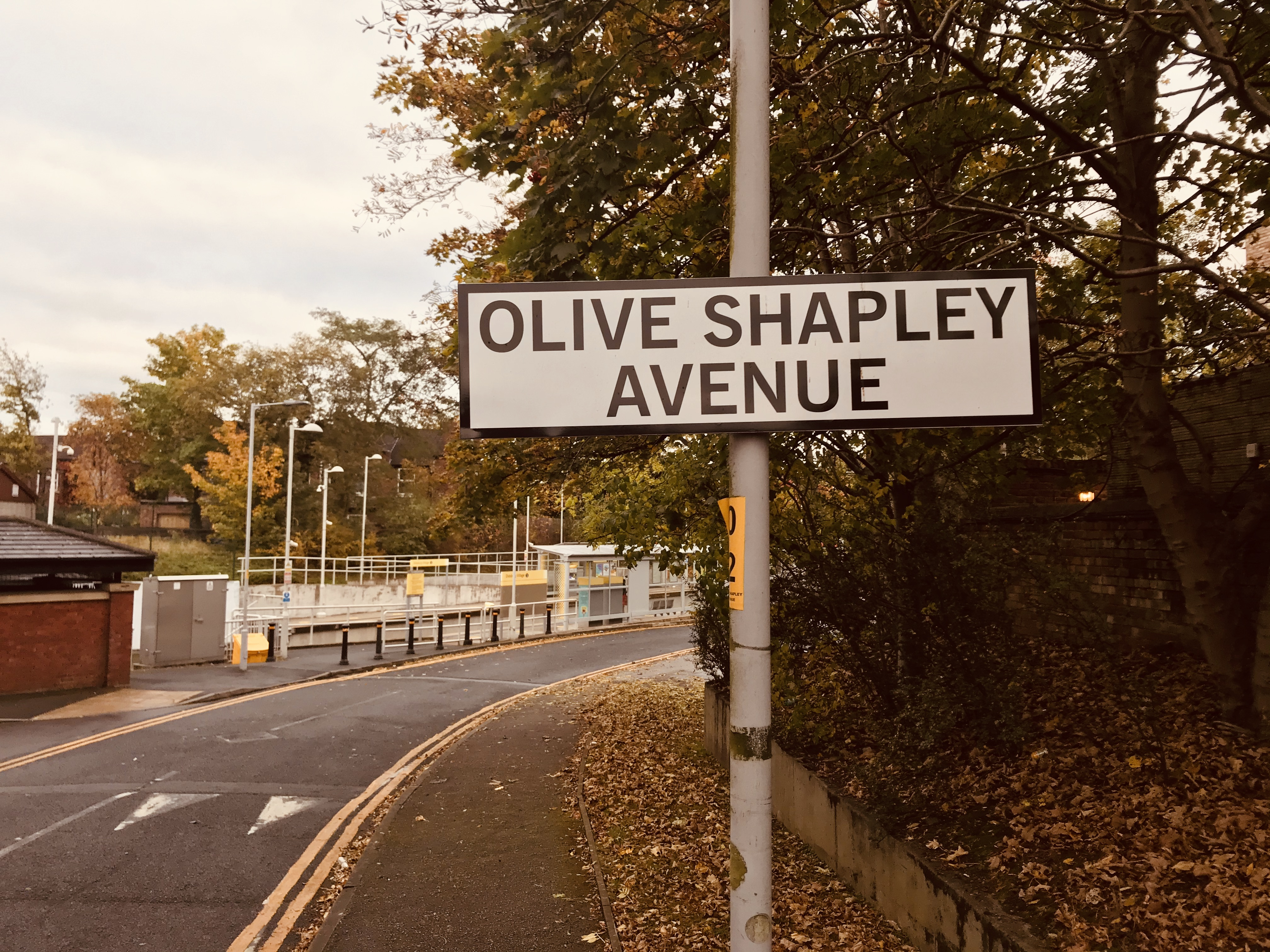
Olive Shapley Avenue in Didsbury, Manchester

In 1939, Shapley married John Salt, the BBC's programme director in the North region; at the time, the BBC did not permit married couples to work together at the corporation, and so Shapley resigned. However, she continued to work for the BBC as a freelancer. In 1941, Salt was appointed deputy North American director by the BBC, meaning Shapley and her husband lived in New York for much of the war. They rented an apartment on Fifth Avenue from fellow broadcaster Alistair Cooke and employed a maid named Mabel, who lived in Harlem. She and Olive formed a friendship, and this connection enabled Olive to gain access to the Black community in Harlem. She began to record interviews with Mabel's neighbours and produced radio programmes about the lives of black people in America. She also started to produce a "newsletter" programme which was sent back to Britain and broadcast fortnightly on the BBC's Children's Hour; among her interviewees were Eleanor Roosevelt and Paul Robeson. Shapley's "newsletter" programme format has been credited as an inspiration for Alistair Cooke's long-running programme for adult listeners, Letter from America.

Salt, who had served as the BBC's North America assistant director (1942–44) and later director (1944–45), died suddenly on 26 December 1947.

=== Woman's Hour ===
Shapley returned to London and lived in Hampstead. She became a regular presenter of Woman's Hour, a programme with which she was associated ("on and off") for over twenty years, introducing the programme between 1949 and July 21, 1950. She is credited with introducing some formerly taboo subjects to the programme, such as discussions about the menopause and women living independently of men. Shapley also wrote articles for Modern Woman magazine. In 1958, she began working in television, presenting Women of Today and narrating a children's programme, Olive Shapley Tells a Story, on BBC Television.

=== Manchester ===
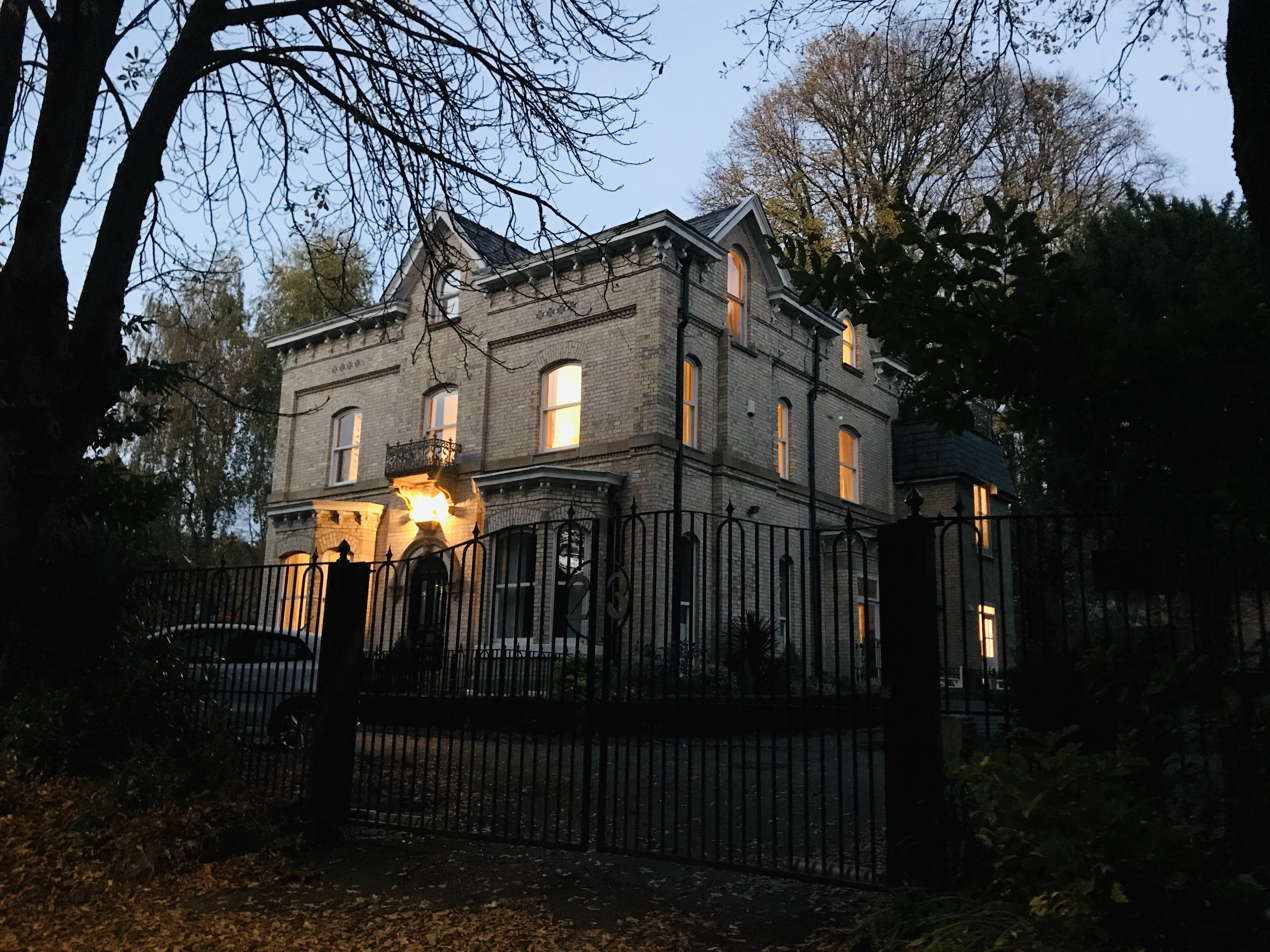
Rose Hill, Olive Shapley's former home on Millgate Lane, Didsbury

Shapley remarried in 1952 to Manchester businessman Christopher Gorton. In 1953, the couple bought Rose Hill, a house on Millgate Lane in Didsbury, Manchester, where Olive lived for 28 years. Gorton died of a heart attack in 1959 and Shapley underwent treatment for severe depression. She subsequently returned to her broadcasting career, taking a six-week BBC television training course in 1959, which enabled her to become a producer in the newer medium. Though largely based at BBC Manchester again, from where she broadcast on television, she regularly commuted to London for some years. She devised a programme about books, Something to Read, and convinced the BBC to use journalist Brian Redhead as the presenter. It had been felt that his Geordie accent would be incomprehensible to viewers.

When in Manchester, Shapley worked at Dickenson Road Studios, the BBC's regional TV production studio which was housed in a converted Methodist Church in Rusholme. Shapley recalled that the facilities at Studio A consisted of "one studio and very cramped make up and other production facilities, with a canteen and a few poky little dressing rooms. We coped well enough, though I do remember apologising sometimes to guests who clearly found the place not quite up to their expectations of the BBC."

=== Humanitarian work ===
In the mid-1960s, Shapley formed the Rose Hill Trust for Unsupported Mothers and Babies (a term she preferred over "unmarried mothers") and set up her home as a refuge for single mothers. In the late 1970s, she used her home as a refuge for Vietnamese boat people. After she sold Rose Hill in 1981, Shapley continued to live in Didsbury until 1992, when she moved to Rhayader in mid-Wales to live closer to her family. Shapley wrote her autobiography with the assistance of her daughter, Christina Hart. Shortly after publication in 1996, Shapley suffered a severe stroke. She was subsequently moved to a nursing home, where she died in 1999.

After her death, a street in Didsbury was named after her, Olive Shapley Avenue.

Olive Shapley was longlisted in 2015 for the WoManchester Statue. Although Emmeline Pankhurst was decisively selected, Shapley's innovative broadcasting work was brought to the attention of a new generation. The Pankhurst statue now sits in St Peter's Square, Manchester. A book published to as part of the statue campaign, First in the Fight, dedicates a chapter to Olive Shapley along with the other nineteen women considered for the statue.

== Publication ==
Olive Shapley's autobiography, Broadcasting a Life, was published in 1996.
