= Sarah Brown =

Sarah or Sara Brown may refer to:

- Sarah Brown (athlete) (born 1986), American middle-distance runner
- Sarah Brown (cook), British pioneer vegetarian television cook
- Sarah Brown (model) (1869–?), pseudonym of Marie Roger, French artists' model in 1890s Paris
- Sarah Brown (politician) (born 1972/73), British Liberal Democrat politician and transgender activist
- Sarah Brown (priest) (born 1965), British Anglican priest
- Sarah Jane Brown (born 1963), charity director, wife of former British prime minister Gordon Brown
- Sarah Joy Brown (born 1975), American actress
- Sara Rittenhouse Brown (1854–1938), American professor, author, and musician
- Sara Suzanne Brown, American actress
- Sara Winifred Brown (1868–1948), African American teacher and medical doctor

== See also ==
- "The Idyll of Miss Sarah Brown", a 1933 short story by Damon Runyon
- Sarah Brown Ingersoll Cooper (1835–1896), American philanthropist and educator
- Sarah Elizabeth Utterson née Brown (1781–1851), English translator and author
- Sarah Lee Brown Fleming (1875–1963), African-American educator, writer, and activist
- Sarah Browne, Irish artist
