= Michael Steed =

British politician (1940–2023)

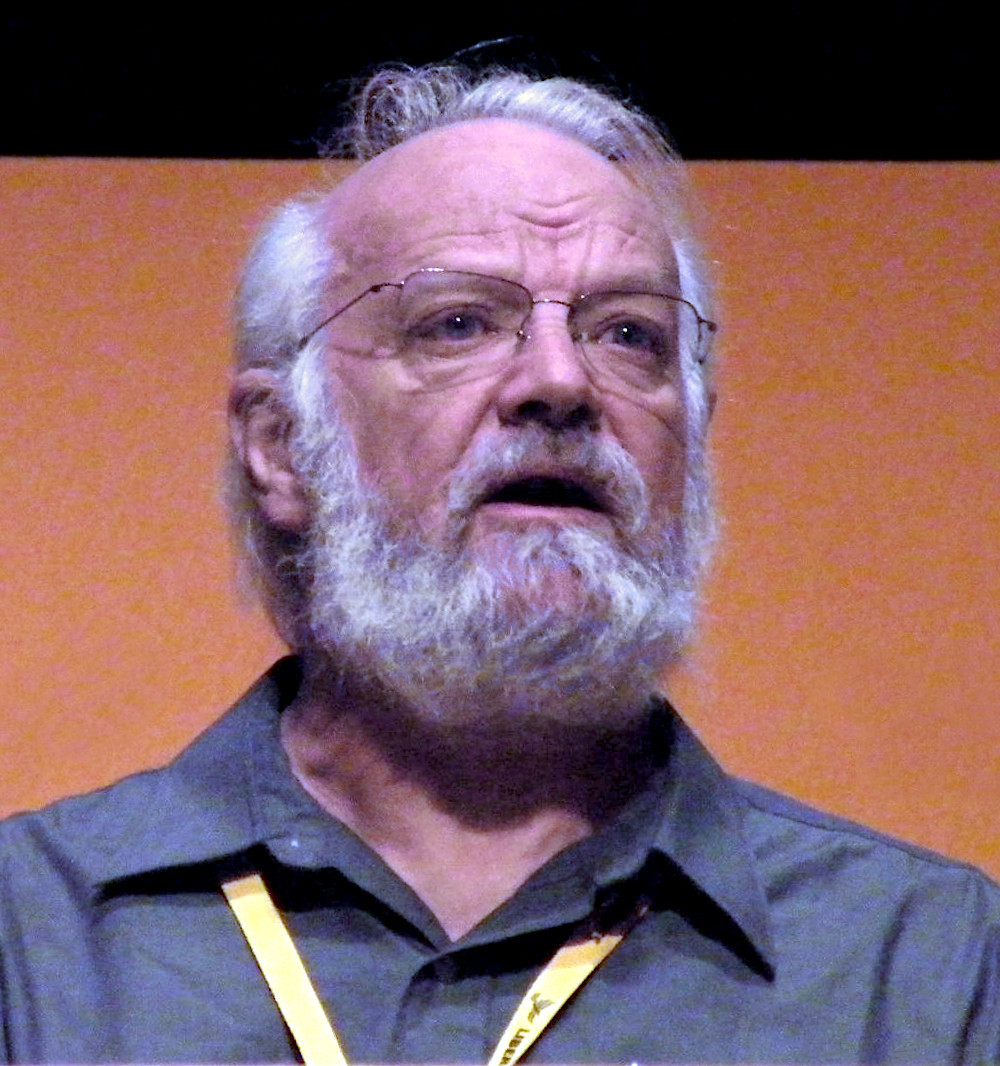
Steed in 2012

Michael Steed (25 January 1940 – 30 August 2023) was a British psephologist, political scientist, broadcaster, activist and Liberal Democrat politician. He wrote extensively on political parties and elections.

== Education and early life ==
Michael Steed was born on 25 January 1940 in Kent, where his father was a farmer. He was educated at St. Lawrence College, Ramsgate, and at Corpus Christi College, Cambridge. In 1960, the South African authorities refused him entry to Sharpeville to deliver food aid to victims of the Sharpeville shootings.

From 1963 to 1965, Steed undertook postgraduate research at Nuffield College, Oxford, under David Butler. At the same time he was active in the Young Liberals, particularly on the issue of apartheid in South Africa. He became national Vice-Chairman of the Young Liberals.

== Career ==
In 1966, Steed became Lecturer in Government at Manchester University, a post he held for many years until taking early retirement through ill health. As a psephologist, he became a specialist in the detailed analysis of election results from a sociological point of view, for many years providing media such as The Observer and The Economist with texts making such complexities as "percentage swing" accessible to the lay reader. In the late-1960s and throughout the 1970s, he made regular television appearances on "election night" programmes, often at the side of Bob McKenzie who popularised the "swingometer" based on the concept of swing devised by David Butler. Steed was to develop a more complex formula for calculating swing, sometimes known among psephologists as "Steed swing" to differentiate it from "Butler swing".

From 1964 to 2005, Steed, latterly in conjunction with Professor John Curtice, was responsible for the statistical analysis in David Butler's regular Nuffield election studies entitled "The British General Election of ....".

== Political activity and views ==
Steed was a leading member of the "radical" wing of the Liberal Party which in the late-1960s and 1970s found itself at odds with the parliamentary party and then-leader Jeremy Thorpe over a number of issues. In particular, Steed and his colleagues felt that "the party must shift attention away from personalities to a wide-ranging debate about ideology, principles and policies". He contributed several articles to the radical monthly, New Outlook. For a time, he was an elected member of the Liberal Party's national executive.

Steed was always an ardent pro-European, and his study of parties and elections soon came to embrace continental as well as UK politics. In 1969, he called for a common European currency.

At the 1971 Liberal Assembly, he successfully moved the major pro-European resolution, noting however that the then-EEC, in which decisions were taken by "a secret cabal", must be made more democratic. National sovereignty, he argued, would "die away as a European democracy of widely diffused power was created and exercised at all levels" in "a close political union of the people of Europe".

Steed consistently called for wide-ranging constitutional reform, including devolution all round, with elected regional governments, a more proportional election system, and the abolition of a Prime Minister's right to dissolve Parliament on a whim. This last objective was finally achieved by the Fixed-term Parliaments Act 2011, only for it to be repealed by the Dissolution and Calling of Parliament Act 2022.

Steed stood as the Liberal Party candidate at the 1967 Brierley Hill by-election and the 1973 Manchester Exchange by-election, in which he pushed the Conservatives into third place. At the 1970 general election, he was the party's candidate for Truro. For the February 1974 general election, he stood at Manchester Central, where the Conservative candidate Christopher Horne pushed him into third place. In the 1979 European elections, he was the Liberal candidate for Greater Manchester North, where he was defeated by veteran Labour politician Barbara Castle. At the 1983 general election, he was the Liberal Party candidate for Burnley.

In 1976, Steed designed the new system for the election of the Leader of the Liberal Party.

Steed was elected President of the Liberal Party 1978–79.

For many years, he was a leading light in the Campaign for Homosexual Equality, serving on its executive committee and for a time as its treasurer. During a period of time when there was still great hostility to gay rights, he spoke out at public meetings, including an acrimonious one in Burnley in 1971 over the proposed establishment of a gay club, at which he shared the platform with Ray Gosling. This meeting has come to be seen as a watershed in the emergence of a national grassroots gay rights movement in Britain.

In 1975, with his former CHE colleague Paul Temperton, he founded Northern Democrat, a magazine calling for democratic regional government. This later developed into the Campaign for the North, an all-party group pressing for devolution for the English regions; as well as Scotland and Wales, with Steed as chairman and Temperton as director, using funding from the Rowntree Trust.

== Retirement ==
In retirement, Steed returned to his native East Kent, where he was active in local Liberal Democrat politics. In July 2008, he was elected to Canterbury City Council.

Steed was Honorary Lecturer in Politics and International Relations at the University of Kent. He has also been Senior Research Fellow of the Federal Trust. He was a trustee of the Canterbury Commemoration Society, and a Vice-President of the Electoral Reform Society, and was a Trustee of the Arthur McDougall Fund until 2017.

In 2012, Steed was elected to the Council of the Social Liberal Forum.

Michael Steed died on 30 August 2023, at the age of 83.

== Publications ==
- (with Dan Mateer and Jon Steel) Charter for Youth, National League of Young Liberals, 1964. OCLC 315337463
- "Voting in Cities: The 1964 Borough Elections", in Urban Studies, 5, no. 3 (1968): 351–352. Sage, London. ISSN 0042-0980
- (with Bryan Keith-Lucas and Peter Hall) The Maud Report (Royal Commission on Local Government), New Society Publications, London, 1970, ISBN 0900438010
- (with David M Clark and Sally Marshall) Greater Manchester votes: a guide to the new metropolitan authorities, Stockport, 1973, ISBN 0950293202
- Who's a Liberal in Europe?, North West Community Newspapers, Manchester, 1975, OCLC 4034678
- "Parties in the European Parliament", in Journal of Common Market Studies, vol. 15, Oxford, 1976. ISSN 0021-9886
- (with Ralph Bancroft and Ben Sawbridge) Self-government for the British, Prism, Watford, 1976. OCLC 333607215
- Fair elections or fiasco?: Proposals for a sensible voting system for the European Parliament, National Committee for Electoral Reform, London, 1977. OCLC 4428843
- (with S.E. Finer) "Politics of Great Britain" in Roy C. Macridis et al. (eds.), Modern Political Systems: Europe, (4th edn), Prentice-Hall, Englewood Cliffs, NJ, 1978. ISBN 978-0135971871
- "The Liberal Party" in H. Drucker (ed.), Multi-Party Britain, Macmillan, London, 1979. ISBN 978-0333240564
- (with John Curtice) From Warrington and Croydon to Downing St.: How to sort out the psephological details of a Liberal-Social Democrat alliance, North West Community Newspapers, Manchester, 1981. ISBN 978-0907803003
- (with David Faull) First past the post: The great British class handicap sponsored by Margaret Thatcher and the Labour Party, LAGER, London, 1981. OCLC 222101152
- "Voters, Parties and Money" in Parliamentary Affairs, vol. 35, Oxford University Press, 1982. OCLC 13162457
- (with John Curtice) "Electoral Choice and The Production of Government: The Changing Operation of the Electoral System in the United Kingdom since 1955", in British Journal of Political Science, vol. 12, Cambridge University Press, 1982. ISSN 0007-1234
- "The Formation of Governments in the United Kingdom" in Political Quarterly, Blackwell, Oxford, vol. 54, 1983. ISSN 0032-3179
- "The European Parliament" in Bogdanor and Butler (eds), Democracy and elections: Electoral systems and their political consequences, Cambridge, 1983, ISBN 0521252954
- "The Alliance: A critical history", in New Outlook vol. 22 No 3, Prism, Guildford, 1983. OCLC 78212441
- (with John Curtice) One in four: An examination of the Alliance performance at constituency level in the 1983 general election, Association of Liberal Councillors, Hebden Bridge, W. Yorkshire, 1984. ISBN 978-0901651051
- "Dr Reece and the proportional loss hypothesis" in Representation, vol. 25, Routledge (for the McDougall Trust), London, 1985. ISSN 0034-4893
- "The Constituency" in Vernon Bogdanor (ed.), Representatives of the People? Parliamentarians and Constituencies in Western Democracies, Gower, Aldershot, 1985. European Centre for Political Studies. ISBN 978-0566008788
- (with John Curtice) "Proportionality and Exaggeration in the British Electoral System" in Electoral Studies, vol. 5, No 3, Butterworths, Guildford, 1986. OCLC 71618129
- "The core—periphery dimension of British politics", Political Geography Quarterly, Volume 5, Issue 4, Supplement 1, October 1986, Pages S91-S103, doi:10.1016/0260-9827(86)90060-1
- (with Raymond Plant) PR for Europe: Proposals to change the electoral system of the European Parliament, Federal Trust, London, 1997, ISBN 0901573663
- "Will devolution change British parties?" in Representation, vol. 36, Routledge (for the McDougall Trust), 1999, ISSN 1749-4001
- (with John Curtice) "And now for the Commons? Lessons from Britain's first experience with proportional representation", in Journal of Elections, Public Opinion and Parties, vol. 10, 2000, ISSN 1745-7297
- (with Roger Morgan) Choice and Representation in The European Union, Tauris (for the Federal Trust), London, 2002, ISBN 0901573736
- (with John Curtice and Stephen Fisher) "An Analysis of the Results", in British Politicians and European Elections 2004 (Ed. Butler and Westlake), Palgrave Macmillan, Basingstoke, 2005, ISBN 978-1403935854
- "Defining Democracy" in Representation, vol. 41, Routledge (for the McDougall Trust), 2005, ISSN 1749-4001

Party political offices
| Preceded by Gruffydd Evans | President of the Liberal Party; 1978–1979 | Succeeded by Richard Holme |
