= Lifestyle (British TV channel) =

British television channel (1985–1993)

- Country: United Kingdom
- Broadcast area: Europe

Ownership
- Owner: WHSTV (WHSmith); DC Thomson; TVS; Yorkshire Television
- Sister channels: Lifestyle Satellite Jukebox; Screensport

History
- Launched: 30 October 1985
- Closed: 24 January 1993
- Replaced by: VOX; UK Living

Lifestyle was a British daytime television channel aimed at women and families. It was broadcast on cable and from February 1989 on transponder 5 of the Astra satellite.

The channel's logo originally consisted of 3D computer graphics forming a face. After its relaunch in November 1987, this was changed to an animated pastel butterfly accompanied by a signature flute tune typifying its gentle and reflective style.

== History ==
=== 1985–1989: Early years ===
Lifestyle was launched as a daytime service on 30 October 1985, initially on various cable networks such as Rediffusion Cablevision in parts of the United Kingdom and on Cablelink in parts of Ireland. Lifestyle's lineup mainly consisted of magazines, novelas and movies and the programming was linked by an in-vision continuity announcer, David Hamilton. By the late 1980s, the channel was showing a range of classic American comedies, crime dramas (such as Divorce Court and Remington Steele) along with film noir classics from the 1940s and 1950s, as well as the daily exercise routine shows such as Charlene Prickett's It Figures and Keep Fit also included. The channel was broadcast from facilities at Molinare, another company owned at the time by WHSmith Group.

=== 1989–1992: Expansion ===
In August 1989, Lifestyle's transmission time was extended and it aired 10.00am to 6.00pm and this coincided with the channel becoming more associated with the Sky Television brand by becoming part of its advertising campaigns for the Astra satellite on which the Sky channels and Lifestyle could be seen. The channel broadcast the successful chat show Sally Jessy Raphael along with several popular American game shows including Classic Concentration, The Joker's Wild, Tic-Tac-Dough and Supermarket Sweep. More recent programming was also acquired, and Australian series including Rafferty's Rules, Cop Shop and Skyways aired along with American soap operas Search for Tomorrow and The Edge of Night.

In 1990, the transponder was used to broadcast the Lifestyle Satellite Jukebox, a music video request channel from 10.00pm to 6.00am. The hours between the ending of Lifestyle's programmes and the start of Satellite Jukebox were filled by the Sell-a-Vision home shopping service. For a time, The Children's Channel also transmitted on transponder 5, airing during the early morning before Lifestyle programming started.

=== 1993: Closure ===
The channel never achieved huge ratings and closed on 24 January 1993. Its most popular shows were moved to Sky One and Astra's transponder 5 was taken over the following day by German language channel VOX.

At 7.57pm, continuity announcer Kate Ricketts stated that "that brings us to the end of weekend Lifestyle, and sadly, to the end of the Lifestyle channel". She and David Hamilton also exchanged gifts and both said goodbye to the viewers while thanking them for having made Lifestyle "such a great channel to work for". Credits of every staff member who worked for the channel rolled, before the station ident played one last time and the logo dissolved on air. On the cable broadcast, at just after 7.59pm, cable operator Videotron added a scrolling message stating:

We have just been informed by the owners of LIFESTYLE that this channel will permanently close down at 8pm on SUNDAY, JANUARY 24. We apologise for the unforeseen loss of this channel which is entirely beyond Videotron's control.

The transmission on satellite ceased immediately at 8.00pm and the VOX logo appeared with text reading 'From 25 January 1993 on this channel', and launched the following day.

Lifestyle's sister network, Screensport was shut down on 1 March. This ended WHSmith's involvement with television. A new women's network called UK Living launched a few months later as part of the Sky Multichannels package on 1 September 1993.

== Programming ==
The following is a list of programmes broadcast on Lifestyle:

=== A–G ===
- A Better Read
- The Adventures of Jim Bowie
- The Adventures of Long John Silver
- African Wave
- Alcoa Presents: One Step Beyond
- Amazing Discoveries
- Annie Oakley
- The Ante Room
- Arcade
- As Good as New
- Atlantic City
- A Week in the Life of
- A-Z of Gardening
- A-Z of Self Sufficiency
- Baby and Co.
- Basic Training
- The Best of Europe
- The Betty White Show
- Beverly Hills Buntz
- The Bill Dana Show
- Body Talk
- Bracken
- Burke's Law
- Burns and Allen
- Buy Lines
- Captain Gallant of the Foreign Legion
- Captain Power and the Soldiers of the Future
- Car 54, Where Are You?
- Championship Rodeo
- The Cisco Kid
- Classic Concentration
- Coffee Break
- Cop Shop
- Country GP
- Country Ways
- Cover Story
- The Cross-Wits
- Cyril Fletcher's Lifestyle Garden
- The Danny Thomas Show
- Dante
- David Hamilton's People
- The David Niven Show
- The Detectives
- The Dick Van Dyke Show
- Divorce Court
- Do It!
- Doc
- The Doctor
- Dr. Ruth's Good Sex Show
- Dream Chasers
- Dreamers
- The Edge of Night
- The Emergency Room
- Ensign O'Toole
- Everyday Workout
- The Family Tree
- Farmhouse Kitchen
- Fashion File
- Festivals of the World
- Flair
- Flash Gordon
- Focus on Britain
- Formula One
- Galloping Gourmet
- Get Smart
- Getting Fit
- Gloss
- The Good Food Show
- Gorgeous Ladies of Wrestling
- Great Chefs
- The Green Hornet

=== H–N ===
- He Shoots, He Scores
- High Rollers
- Hollywood Interview
- Hollywood TV Theatre
- Homeshopping Club
- House Rules
- I Can Jump Puddles
- In Search of Wildlife
- It Figures
- It's a Vet's Life
- It's Your Lifestyle
- Jack Thompson Down Under
- Jackpot
- Jake's Fitness Minute
- Jason of Star Command
- The Joan Rivers Show
- Jocasta Innes' Paint Effects
- Johnny Ringo
- The Joker's Wild
- Keep Fit
- Learned Friends
- Lifestyle Plus
- Lifestyles of the Rich and Famous
- Lunchbox
- Make Room for Daddy
- Making the Most of
- Mary
- McKeever and the Colonel
- Me and My Camera
- The Microwave Cook
- Monte Carlo Circus
- Monty Nash
- The Mothers-in-Law
- Name That Tune
- The New Newlywed Game
- Night in Tunisia
- Northwest Passage

=== O–U ===
- On Top of the World
- Paradise Steamship
- Paris
- Parkfield Video Review Show
- Pets and People
- The Phil Donahue Show
- Phyllis
- Pizza Gourmet
- Power Hits USA
- Power Without Glory
- Powerful Women of Wrestling
- Rafferty's Rules
- Rambo: The Force of Freedom
- Remington Steele
- The Rich Also Cry
- Ride on Stranger
- Rocky Jones, Space Ranger
- The Rogues
- Roller Derby
- The Rush Limbaugh Show
- Saints and Sinners
- Sally Jessy Raphael
- Search for Tomorrow
- The Secrets of Isis
- Sell-a-Vision
- Short Casts
- Simply Marvellous
- Skyways
- Slim Cooking
- The Smothers Brothers Show
- Space Patrol
- Spain Spain Cookery
- Spain Spain Holiday
- Spain Spain International Cuisine
- Spanish Cocktail
- Spiral Zone
- Star Time
- Style File
- Supermarket Sweep
- Taff Acre
- Take Kerr
- Target: The Corruptors!
- Tea Break
- Telemart
- Three for the Road
- Tic-Tac-Dough
- Tom Corbett, Space Cadet
- The Tom Ewell Show
- The Tony Randall Show
- Top Class
- Travelview Tips
- Underwater World

=== V–Z ===
- The Vet
- Video Tours
- Video Visits
- We're Cooking Now
- What's Cooking?
- What's New
- The White Shadow
- Wild, Wild World of Animals
- WKRP in Cincinnati
- Wok with Yan
- Women of the World
- Women of Today
- World Class Championship Wrestling
- The World of Survival
- The World We Live In
- Young People's Specials
- Young Ramsay
- Your Show of Shows
- Zorro's Fighting Legion

== See also ==
- Timeline of cable television in the United Kingdom
- List of European television stations
