= Sarah Brown (cook) =

Pioneer Vegetarian cook, broadcaster and author

Sarah Brown's Vegetarian Kitchen - 1984

Sarah Brown was an English food writer and television cook. She presented the first vegetarian cookery show on British television.

Sarah Brown opened a whole food shop in Scarborough in 1978. Two years later this evolved into a vegetarian restaurant. She appeared several times on Yorkshire Television's Farmhouse Kitchen. In 1984 her successful series Vegetarian Kitchen was broadcast on BBC Two. Her book of the same name was reprinted eight times. She served as the national coordinator of cookery for the Vegetarian Society.

Sarah died of cancer in May 2026.

== Books ==
- Sarah Brown's Vegetarian Kitchen. (1984) BBC Books. ISBN 0-563-21034-6
- Sarah Brown's Vegetarian Cookbook. (1984) Dorling Kindersley Limited. ISBN 0-86318-042-6
- Sarah Brown's Vegetarian Microwave Cookbook. (1987) Dorling Kindersley Publishers Ltd. ISBN 978-0863181993
- Sarah Brown's Quick and Easy Vegetarian Cookery. (1989) BBC Books. ISBN 0-563-20695-0
- Sarah Brown's Healthy Pregnancy, a Vegetarian Approach. (1992) BBC Books. ISBN 0-563-36248-0
