= The Arts Channel =

1980s British cable television channel

The Arts Channel was a British highbrow television channel available in the early years of cable television in the UK. It was founded by John Griffiths and started broadcasting on 29 September 1985.

The channel was launched by British Cable Programs, itself backed by WHSmith (through WHSmith Television), Television South, Commercial Union and Equity and Law. TVS used its stake to air its productions on the channel. It started as a daily 150-minute block which was distributed via video cassettes to the cable companies, but planned an expansion of its broadcasting hours early on. 65% of its programmes were acquisitions, while the remaining 35% were produced by the channel. During 1986, the channel announced the airing of 120 hours worth of visual arts-related programming per year. This included Collections (permanent or temporary art exhibits) and The Also Arts (art forms rarely seen on television, such as wood carving or industrial design).

Towards the end of the channel's lifespan, its control was put up under the hands of United Cable Programming. The service finally wound down operations in April 1989 as the new owners could not afford a new injection of money.
