= William Angus (British politician) =

William Angus (3 December 1841 – 6 July 1912) was a British Liberal Party activist.

Born at Matfen High House, near Corbridge in Northumberland, Angus was educated privately, and at Croft House in Brampton, Carlisle. He later ran a carriage building company in Newcastle-upon-Tyne. He argued that the novelty of the motor car would wear away, and horse-drawn carriages would increase in popularity, particularly for leisure use.

Angus became prominent in the Baptist Church, and also in the Newcastle Liberal Party. He was knighted in 1907, and in 1908 was elected as the President of the National Liberal Federation, serving until 1911. He died in 1912, aged 70.

Party political offices
Preceded by Arthur Dyke Acland	President of the National Liberal Federation; 1908–1911	Succeeded by John Brunner
