= President of the Liberal Party =

This is a list of people who served as president of the British Liberal Party. The Liberal Party merged into the Liberal Democrats in 1988.

The post was established in 1877 as president of the National Liberal Federation. In 1936, this body was replaced by the Liberal Party Organisation, which survived until 1988.

== Presidents ==
=== President of the National Liberal Federation ===
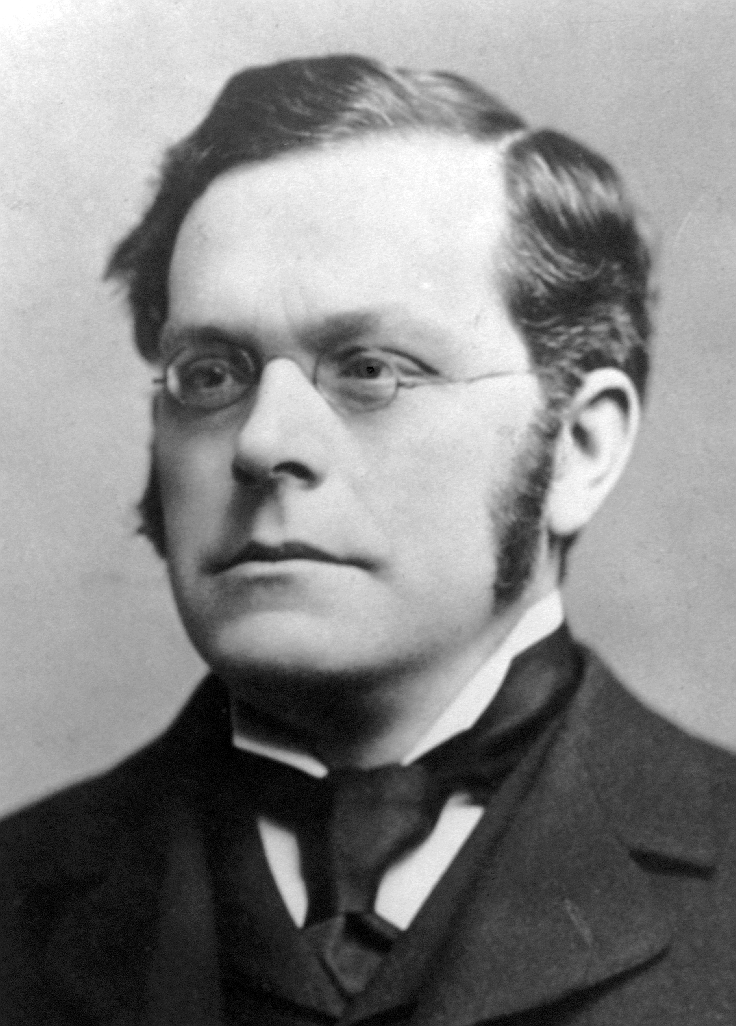
Augustine Birrell, 1902–06

J. M. Robertson, 1920–23

From	To	Name
1877	1881	Joseph Chamberlain
1881	1881	Jesse Collings
1881	1883	Henry Fell Pease
1883	1890	James Kitson
1890	1902	Robert Spence Watson
1902	1906	Augustine Birrell
1906	1908	Arthur Dyke Acland
1908	1911	William Angus
1911	1919	John Brunner
1919	1920	George Lunn
1920	1923	John M. Robertson
1923	1926	Donald Maclean
1926	1927	John Alfred Spender
1927	1930	Charles Hobhouse
1930	1933	Arthur Brampton
1933	1936	Ramsay Muir

=== President of the Liberal Party Organisation ===
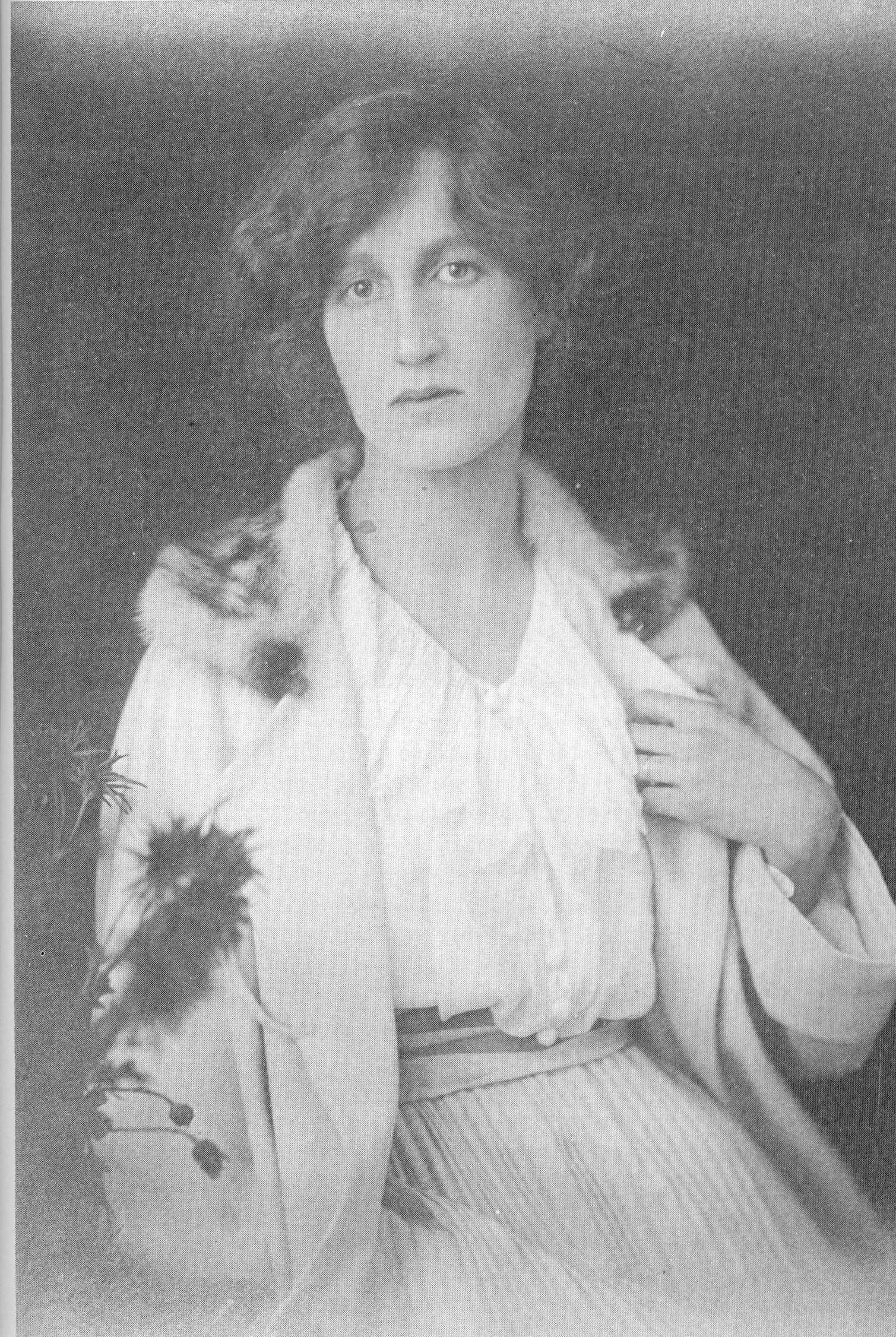
Violet Bonham-Carter 1945–47

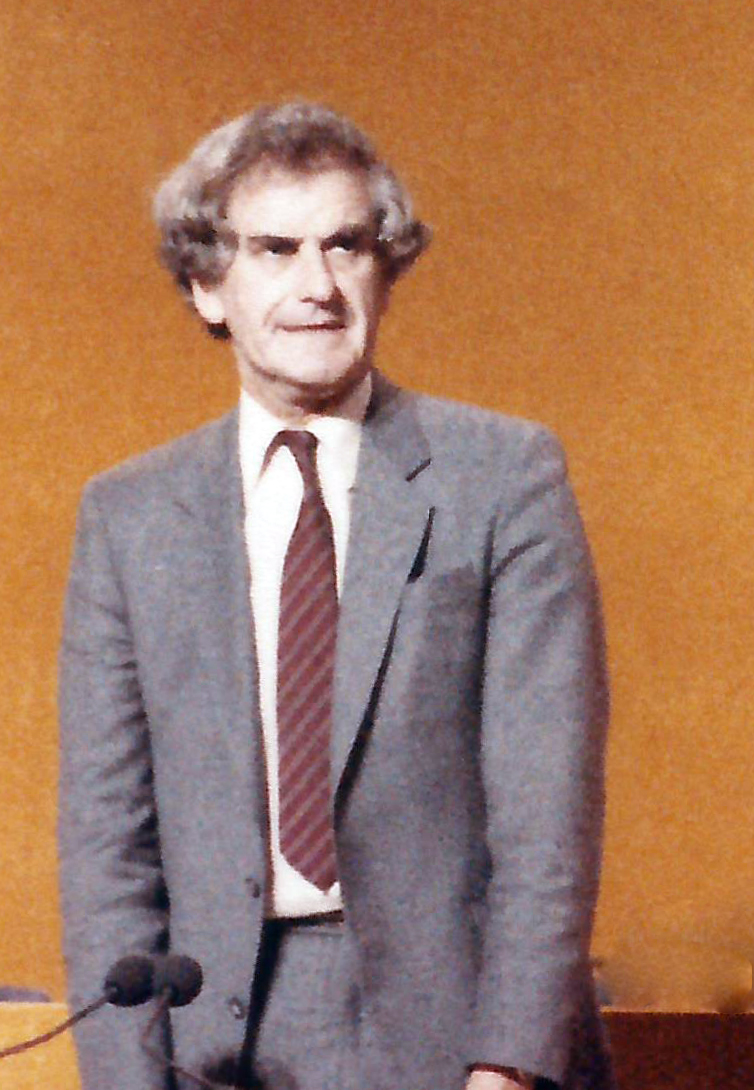
Adrian Slade 1987–88

From	To	Name
1936	1943	James Meston
1943	1945	Position vacant
1945	1947	Violet Bonham-Carter
1947	1948	Isaac Foot
1948	1949	Elliott Dodds
1949	1950	Andrew McFadyean
1950	1952	Philip Fothergill
1952	1953	Ronald Walker
1953	1954	Lawrence Robson
1954	1955	Henry Graham White
1955	1955	Philip Rea
1955	1957	Leonard Behrens
1957	1958	Nathaniel Micklem
1958	1959	Arthur Comyns Carr
1959	1960	Harold Glanville
1960	1961	Andrew Hunter Arbuthnot Murray
1961	1962	Edwin Malindine
1962	1963	Felix Brunner
1963	1964	David Rees-Williams
1964	1965	Roger Fulford
1965	1966	Nancy Seear
1966	1967	Michael Eden
1967	1968	Donald Wade
1968	1969	Desmond Banks
1969	1970	Timothy Beaumont
1970	1971	Inga-Stina Robson
1971	1972	Stephen Terrell
1972	1973	Trevor Jones
1973	1974	Rhys Lloyd
1974	1975	Arthur Holt
1975	1976	Margaret Wingfield
1976	1977	Basil Goldstone
1977	1978	Gruffydd Evans
1978	1979	Michael Steed
1979	1980	Joyce Rose
1980	1981	Richard Holme
1981	1982	Viv Bingham
1982	1983	John Griffiths
1983	1984	Geoff Tordoff
1984	1985	Alan Watson
1985	1986	David Penhaligon
1986	1987	Des Wilson
1987	1988	Adrian Slade

In 1988, Michael Meadowcroft was president-elect of the Liberal Party for the 1988–89 year; but the Liberal Party merger with the Social Democratic Party went ahead before he could take up office.
