= WHSmith Television =

British television company

- Type: Broadcast television
- Founded: 1984
- Defunct: 28 February 1993
- Fate: Defunct in 1993
- Headquarters: United Kingdom
- Area served: National; also available in Europe
- Owner: WHSmith

WHSmith Television (abbreviated WHSTV) was a subsidiary of WHSmith which produced cable channels for the British and wider European market. The company owned Lifestyle and Screensport and had a stake in the Dutch children's channel Kindernet. The company ultimately folded in 1993.

== History ==
WHSmith was first involved in the television landscape in 1984 when it set up British Cable Programmes, where it had a 47% stake. Initially it had a 27% share in Screensport, founded in 1983, whose broadcasts began on 29 March 1984. Other parties involved in the project were Yorkshire Television and Television South from the ITV network, as well as DC Thomson (17,7% each). Its first project was The Arts Channel, with which WHSmith invested £2 million and launched it in September 1985. Quickly, the company launched Lifestyle at the end of the year, sharing channel space with Screensport, which, at the time, opened at 5pm. In early 1986, WHSmith acquired ABC's shares in Screensport and became a majority shareholder.

In 1985, WHSmith's television experiment began to look into expansion in the broader European market. Screensport was the first to launch in August-September 1985, on cable networks in the Netherlands and Sweden. The Arts Channel was underperforming and covered 15,000 households in four cable franchise areas in the UK, so it decided to contact cable companies in Sweden, Finland, Norway, the Netherlands and Ireland. However, few cable contacts were made in these countries. In this period, WHSmith also financed, together with Fuji Eight, Telecable Benelux and Finnish television producer Dennis Livson, the creation of Kindernet, a three-hour channel delivered on cable in the Netherlands. It launched on 1 March 1988. At that time, WHSTV's three channels were broadcasting on the same Intelsat V transponder, Kindernet was followed by Lifestyle and then Screensport. WHSTV also owned Molinare TV, a television uplink facility for its channels, which also provided studios. In late 1990, it formed The European Sports Network (TESN), involving the multilingual Screensport network.

In 1991, WHSTV was renamed European Television Networks (ETN) after acquiring the satellite television operation from Capital Cities/ABC, Canal+ and Générale d'Images. At the time of renaming, Francis Baron was its CEO. However, the company was failing to turn a profit and WHSmith announced its intent to leave the industry. ABC/Capital Cities subsequently acquired most of TESN and was mooting a merger with Eurosport. In early 1993, the parties reached an agreement to close its two channels. Lifestyle closed on 25 January and Screensport on 28 February. The last ETN feed, TV Sport, became the French feed of Eurosport and received backing from the TF1 and Bouygues groups.

== Channels ==
- The Arts Channel
- Screensport
- Lifestyle
- Lifestyle Satellite Jukebox
- Kindernet (Netherlands)
