= Geoffrey Tordoff, Baron Tordoff =

British businessman and politician (1928–2019)

The Right Honourable The Lord Tordoff
- Tordoff in the Lords chamber, 2012

Member of the House of Lords
- Lord Temporal
- Life peerage 11 May 1981 – 13 October 2016

Personal details
- Born: 11 October 1928
- Died: 22 June 2019 (aged 90)

Geoffrey Johnson Tordoff, Baron Tordoff (11 October 1928 – 22 June 2019) was a British businessman and politician.

== Biography ==
The son of Stanley Acomb Tordoff, he was educated at Manchester Grammar School and the University of Manchester Institute of Science and Technology. Tordoff worked for Shell from 1950 to 1983, first as marketing executive of Shell Chemicals, then as public affairs manager for Shell UK. Between 1986 and 1992 he was Honorary President of the British Youth Council. From 1990 to 1994 he was chair of the Middle East Committee of the Refugee Council. He was a member of the Press Complaints Commission between 1995 and 2002.

As a Liberal Party candidate, Tordoff contested Northwich in the 1964 general election and Knutsford in the 1966 general election and 1970 general election. On 11 May 1981 he was created a life peer as Baron Tordoff, of Knutsford in the County of Cheshire and sat in the House of Lords as a Liberal Democrat until his retirement on 13 October 2016.

He was elected President of the Liberal Party for 1984–1985. In 1953, he married Mary Patricia Swarbrick (died 11 April 2013). They had three daughters and two sons. He died on 22 June 2019 at the age of 90.

== Sources ==
- Lord Tordoff profile at the site of Liberal Democrats
- "DodOnline". Archived from the original on 3 October 2006.

Parliament of the United Kingdom
Preceded by The Lord MacKay of Ardbrecknish	Chairman of Committees of the House of Lords; 2001 – 2002	Succeeded by The Lord Brabazon of Tara
Party political offices
Preceded by Kenneth Vaus	Chairman of the Liberal Party; 1976–1980	Succeeded by Roger Pincham
Preceded by John Griffiths	President of the Liberal Party; 1983–1984	Succeeded by Alan Watson
