= John Griffiths (Liberal politician) =

John Charles Griffiths (born 19 April 1934) is a former British Liberal Party politician, author and media entrepreneur.

Griffiths worked for Thomson Newspapers and the BBC while becoming active in the Liberal Party. Chairman of the National League of Young Liberals. He stood unsuccessfully in Ludlow at the 1964 general election, then in Wanstead and Woodford in 1966, and Bedford at the February and October 1974 general elections. A post at the Press Association in the late 1960s led him to a career in public relations, while he also wrote the first of many books, The Survivors, Afghanistan and Modern Iceland.

In 1982–1983, Griffiths served as President of the Liberal Party, where he launched a full review of all the party's structures. He continued to write books, including The Science of Winning Squash and further work on Afghanistan. In 1986, he founded the Arts Channel and ran the Minerva Vision production company. Griffiths continues to write, and is also a Trustee of Asthma UK.

Party political offices
Preceded by Viv Bingham	President of the Liberal Party; 1982–1983	Succeeded by Geoff Tordoff
