= Gruffydd Evans, Baron Evans of Claughton =

British politician (1928–1992)

The Right Honourable The Lord Evans of Claughton
- Evans in 1977

Member of the House of Lords Lord Temporal
- In office 24 April 1978 – 22 March 1992; Life Peerage

Personal details
- Born: 9 February 1928
- Died: 22 March 1992 (aged 64)
- Party: Liberal Democrats

David Thomas Gruffydd Evans, Baron Evans of Claughton, DL (9 February 1928 – 22 March 1992) was a British solicitor and Liberal politician. As Lord Evans, held the office of Deputy Lieutenant of Merseyside. He was created a life peer as Baron Evans of Claughton, of Claughton in the County of Merseyside, on 24 April 1978.

Evans was born in Birkenhead. His family were Welsh-speaking, originally from Anglesey. He studied at Birkenhead School and later at Liverpool University. Over a period he served on Birkenhead County Borough Council, Wirral Borough Council and finally Merseyside County Council, leading the Liberal group. He tried twice, in 1964 and 1966, to win a parliamentary seat but was unsuccessful. As President of the Liberal Party in 1977-78, he played an important role in dealing with the fall-out from the controversy relating to the activities of former party leader Jeremy Thorpe.

Party political offices
Preceded by Basil Wigoder	Chairman of the Liberal Party Executive; 1965–1967	Succeeded by John Arnold Baker
Preceded by Basil Goldstone	President of the Liberal Party; 1977–1978	Succeeded by Michael Steed
Preceded by Maldwyn Thomas	President of the Welsh Liberal Party; 1986–1987	Succeeded by ?
