= Richard Holme, Baron Holme of Cheltenham =

British Liberal Democrat politician (1936–2008)

The Right Honourable The Lord Holme of Cheltenham CBE PC

Member of the House of Lords
- Lord Temporal
- Life peerage 29 May 1990 – 4 May 2008

Personal details
- Born: 27 May 1936
- Died: 4 May 2008 (aged 71)

Richard Gordon Holme, Baron Holme of Cheltenham CBE, PC (27 May 1936 – 4 May 2008) was a British Liberal Democrat politician.

Educated at University of Oxford (BA Jurisprudence; St John's College) and Harvard Business School, Holme joined the Liberal Party in 1959, and was elected as the party's President in 1980 and 1981. He stood unsuccessfully as the Liberal candidate in East Grinstead, West Sussex, in 1964, and in a 1965 by-election. He then stood in Braintree, Essex, in October 1974. He later sought election at the more promising Cheltenham at the 1983 general election and at the 1987 general election. He was appointed a CBE in the 1983 New Year's Honours.

After the Liberal Party's merger with SDP in 1988, he joined the newly formed Liberal Democrats. He later said that he believed that had the merger happened before the 1987 general election, then the party could have attracted more votes and seats at that election and displaced Labour in the opposition. However, the merger did not happen sooner because of objections from SDP leader David Owen, who resigned later in 1987.

Holme was a close advisor to David Steel when he was leader of the Liberal Party, and to his successor, the first Liberal Democrat leader Paddy Ashdown. He was made a life peer on 29 May 1990, as Baron Holme of Cheltenham, of Cheltenham in the County of Gloucestershire. In 2000, he was appointed as a Privy Counsellor. His 1999 appointment as chairman of the Broadcasting Standards Commission was cut short when he was forced to resign after News of the World allegations of multiple adultery and 'bizarre sex games'.

He was a fellow of the British-American Project and chair of the Hansard Society from 2001 to 2007. Holme also served as a Member of the Board of Advisors for the Global Panel Foundation, a respected NGO that works behind the scenes in crisis areas around the world.

Holme died from cancer on 4 May 2008.

Party political offices
Preceded by Michael Steed	President of the Liberal Party; 1980–1981	Succeeded by Viv Bingham
