= Viv Bingham =

British political activist

Vivian Bingham OBE (11 April 1932 – 3 March 2012), known as Viv Bingham, was a British political activist.

== Biography ==
Bingham grew up in Alnwick, Northumberland, England, before studying at New College, Oxford. He worked as a personnel director, then as a company managing director and management consultant. He joined the Co-operative Wholesale Society (now the Co-operative Group) in 1980 and took on a passionate long-term commitment to co-operation and to industrial democracy generally which he badgered the Liberal Party and, later, the Liberal Democrats to get into legislation. Long a Liberal Party activist, Bingham stood in Heywood and Royton in the February and October 1974 general elections, then in Hazel Grove in 1979, and West Derbyshire in 1983, as well as Cheshire East at the 1979 elections to the European Parliament, but was never elected.

Bingham was a supporter of unilateral nuclear disarmament, and a leading figure in Liberal CND. From 1981 to 1982, he served as President of the Liberal Party. He was subsequently awarded the OBE in 1994.

At the 2005 general election he stood for the Liberal Democrats in Stalybridge and Hyde.

== Personal ==
Bingham's second marriage, to Cecilia Gowan, produced two daughters, Katy and Jessica.

Bingham suffered a mild heart attack in September 2011 but apparently recovered. He suffered a second heart attack shortly after cancer surgery and died on 3 March 2012, aged 79.

Party political offices
Preceded by Richard Holme	President of the Liberal Party; 1981–1982	Succeeded by John Griffiths
