= Alan Watson, Baron Watson of Richmond =

British politician

The Right Honourable The Lord Watson of Richmond CBE
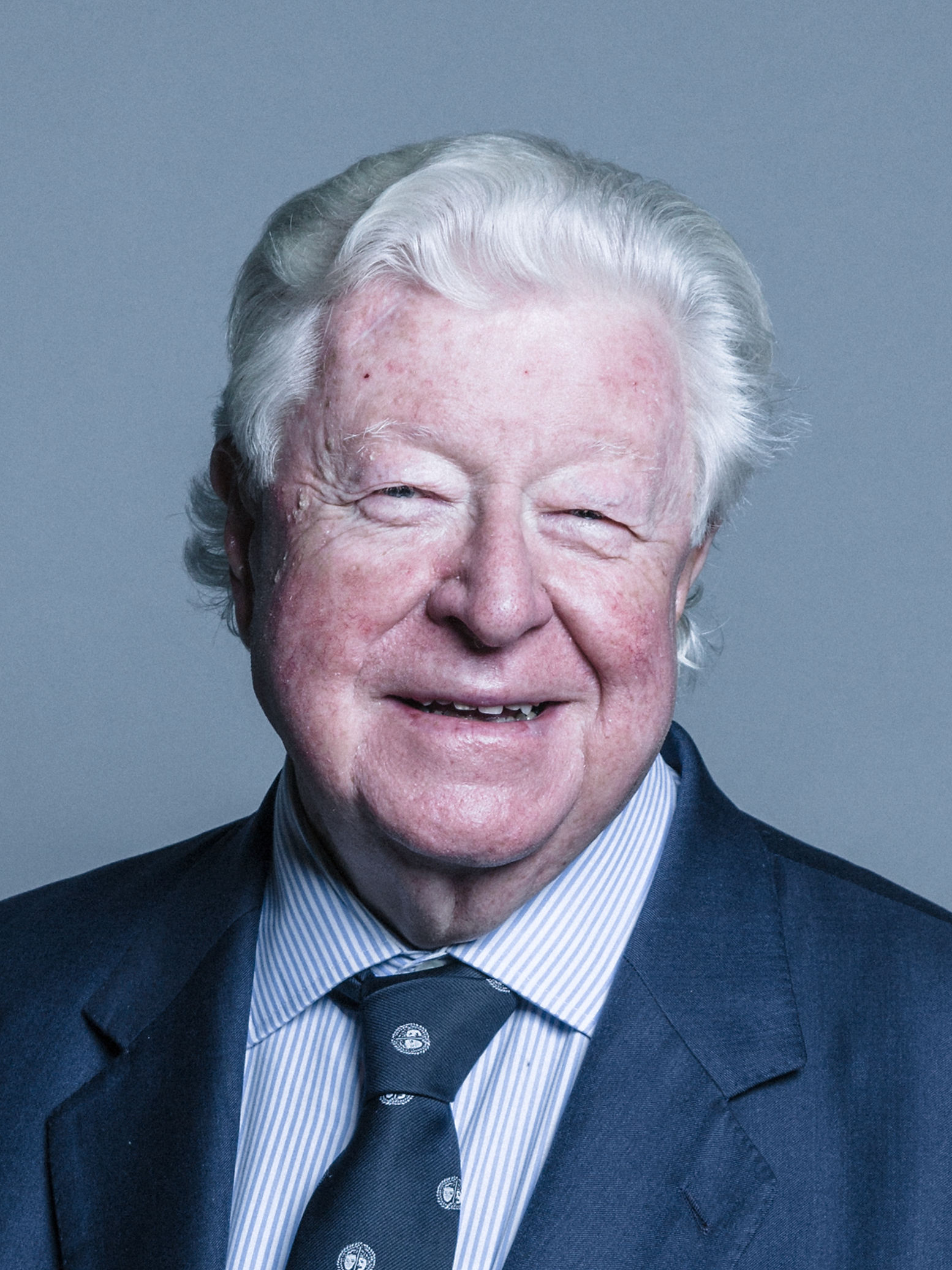

Member of the House of Lords
- Lord Temporal
- Life peerage 23 July 1999 – 25 July 2023

President of the Liberal Party
- In office 1984–1985
- Preceded by: Geoffrey Tordoff, Baron Tordoff
- Succeeded by: David Penhaligon

Personal details
- Born: 3 February 1941 (age 85) Port Elizabeth, South Africa
- Party: Liberal Democrats (since 1988)
- Other political affiliations: Liberal (before 1988)
- Children: 2
- Education: University of Cambridge
- Occupation: Journalist; Politician; Broadcast presenter
- Website: www.lordalanwatson.com

Alan John Watson, Baron Watson of Richmond CBE (born 3 February 1941) is a UK-based broadcaster, Liberal Democrat politician and leadership communications consultant.

== Early life and education ==
Lord Watson of Richmond is the son of the Rev. John William Watson and Edna Mary Peters. He was educated at the Diocesan College, Cape Town in South Africa and Kingswood School in Bath. He was an Open Scholar in history at Jesus College, Cambridge 1959, a State Scholar 1959 and was awarded an MA in 1963. He was the Vice-President of the Cambridge Union.

Watson's German-born wife Karen is an artist: they have two sons, Stephen and Martin.

== Career ==
=== Broadcasting ===
Watson joined the BBC after graduating from Cambridge University in 1963, and later became a regular presenter for The Money Programme on BBC Two and Panorama on BBC One. He also reported on London Weekend Television, Radio 4 and the BBC World Service, and wrote and presented award-winning documentaries over many years. He was one of the studio contributors to the BBC's June 1970 Election Night television programme.

He is a Fellow and Former Chairman of the Royal Television Society. From 1976 to 1980 he was responsible for media at the European Commission.

=== Politics ===
In politics, Watson's notable role was as President of the Liberal Party. He was appointed CBE in 1985 and, on 23 July 1999 was elevated to the House of Lords with a life peerage as Baron Watson of Richmond, of Richmond in the London Borough of Richmond upon Thames. He was a member of the House of Lords Select Committee on the European Union.

He stood for election four times: as the Liberal candidate for Richmond in the general elections of October 1974 and 1979, and as the Liberal candidate (SDP-Liberal Alliance) for Richmond and Barnes in the general elections of 1983 and 1987. On all four occasions, he came in second place, losing to the Conservatives.

Outside of the United Kingdom, Lord Watson is Chair of the Albanian British Chamber of Commerce and is a Member of the European Parliament's High Level Group on Romania. His political interests are the "worldwide use of English, EU enlargement and transatlantic relationship".

He retired from the House of Lords on 25 July 2023.

=== Leadership communications ===
Lord Watson was Chairman of CTN Communications until retirement, a creative communications agency based on St Martin's Lane in central London. He advises the leaders of major UK and international companies on their communications, with clients including BP, BAE Systems and Tesco.

=== Board memberships ===
==== Business ====
- Executive Chairman, CTN Communications
- Executive Chairman, Havas Media
- Chairman, Nexus Partnerships
- Chairman, Coca-Cola European Advisory Board
- Non-Executive Chairman, I-COMP

==== Not-for-profit ====
- Chairman, The Council of Commonwealth Societies
- Chairman, The European Movement UK
- Chairman, The Father Thames Trust
- Chairman, The Arcadia Advisory Board
- British Chairman, Königswinter Anglo-German Conference
- President, British-German Association
- Co-Chair, Jamestown 1607-2007 British Committee
- Non-Executive Chairman, Raisin Social (a wine importer)
- Member, The Executive Committee of the Pilgrims Society
- Member, The Prince of Wales Business Leaders' Forum
- Patron, The Richmond Society
- Patron, Museum of Richmond
- Patron, The Richmond in Europe Association
- International Chairman Emeritus, The English-Speaking Union
- Chairman Emeritus, Royal Television Society
- Former Executive Board Member, UNICEF UK
- President, The European-Atlantic Movement (TEAM)

== Positions at educational institutions ==
Lord Watson holds a range of visiting and honorary posts at universities in the United Kingdom and abroad.

=== United Kingdom ===
- High Steward, Cambridge University
- Visiting Fellow, Oriel College, Oxford University
- Honorary Fellow, Jesus College, Cambridge
- Chairman, Cambridge University Chemistry Advisory Board
- Life Patron, Cambridge's Churchill Archives Centre
- Chairman, The Cambridge Foundation
- Honorary Professor, University of Birmingham
- Trustee, The American International University in London
- Former Chairman, Governors at Westminster College, Oxford
- President, The British Accreditation Council for Independent Further and Higher Education

=== Overseas ===
- Honorary Doctor, St Lawrence University, USA
- Visiting Professor, Leuven, Belgium
- Honorary Professor, Saint Petersburg State University, Russia
- Honorary Professor, Korea University, South Korea
- Trustee, The Centre for British Studies, Humboldt University, Berlin
- Churchill Fellow, Westminster College, Fulton, Missouri

== Publications ==
=== Europe at Risk ===
Europe at Risk was Lord Waton's first publication, released in 1972.

=== The Germans: Who Are They Now? ===
The Germans: Who Are They Now? is a non-fiction book, first published in 1992.

=== Eminent Europeans: personalities who shaped contemporary Europe ===
Eminent Europeans: personalities who shaped contemporary Europe is a collection of 17 essays on the personalities who have shaped modern Europe, for which Lord Watson contributed the essay entitled Thatcher and Kohl: Old Rivalries Revisited. The book was published in 1996, and edited by Martyn Bond, Julie Smith and William Wallace.

=== Jamestown: The Voyage of English ===
Published in 2007, Jamestown: The Voyage of English is an exploration of the global significance of the arrival of the Godspeed, the Susan Constant and the Discovery on America's East Coast in 1607. These three ships carried the ideas and the language which would shape the modern world. Lord Watson tells the story of a precarious venture that nearly failed. But it succeeded against the odds, planting the seeds of representative government, capitalism and the rule of law. These ideas were expressed in a language which had just reached a peak of power and vitality – the English of Shakespeare, Tyndale and Cranmer's Prayer Book. The year 1607 marks the start of the voyage of English from the language of 4 million inhabitants of the British Isles to its role as today's working language of the global village used by almost 2 billion people world-wide.

=== The Queen and the USA ===
The Queen and the USA is a non-fiction book published in March 2012 by Dementi Milestone Publishing. During 2012, Queen Elizabeth II celebrated the 60th anniversary of her role as Queen of the United Kingdom. This book explores and celebrates the special relationship between the American and British people during this period, and honours Queen Elizabeth II for her role and contribution to a friendship recognised throughout the world. Co-authored by Horace Edward "Chip" Mann, the book is highly visual, and includes photographs of the Queen with twelve US Presidents.

=== Churchill's Legacy, Two Speeches to Save the World ===
Published in 2016, Churchill's Legacy, Two Speeches to Save the World is a non-fiction book published in September 2016 by Bloomsbury Publishing to mark the 70th anniversary of Churchill's speeches in 1946, first in March in Fulton, Missouri, often known as the Iron Curtain speech, and then in September in Zurich, Switzerland, often known as the United States of Europe speech.

== Honours and awards ==
Below is a list of Lord Watson's most notable awards. For educational honours, please see the above section, Positions at Educational Institutions.

- Commander of the Order of the British Empire, 1985
- Federal Cross of Merit (Germany), 1995 (for his "significant and enduring contribution" to understanding between Germany and Britain)
- Grand Cross of Merit (Germany), 2001
- Commander's Grand Cross of the Romanian Order of Merit, 2004
- Churchill Medal, 2005
- The Loyola Schools Award for Outstanding Achievement in the Promotion of English by Manila University, 2005
- Knights Grand Cross of the German Order of Merit, 2007
- Doctor Honoris Causa University of Tirana, For the valuable contribution to the development of the Albanian state, 2010
- Knight of Honor of the Order of St. George, 2016

Coat of arms of Alan Watson, Baron Watson of Richmond
Crest A swan wings elevated inverted and addorsed Argent between beaked and legged Gules holding in the dexter claw a rose per pale Gules and Argent barbed seeded slipped and leaved Or. Escutcheon Gules a wyvern displayed Argent between three escallops Or. Supporters On either side a springbok reguardant Gules the face underparts and lower rump Argent armed unguled and gorged with a line reflexed over the boot Or. Motto Sans Dieu Rien

Party political offices
Preceded by The Lord Tordoff	President of the Liberal Party; 1984–1985	Succeeded by David Penhaligon
Orders of precedence in the United Kingdom
Preceded by The Lord Bradshaw	Gentlemen; Baron Watson of Richmond	Followed by The Lord Kirkham
