= Murders of Gerald and Vera Woodman =

1985 crime in Los Angeles, United States

The murders of Gerald and Vera Woodman, also referred to by the press as the ninja murders and the Yom Kippur murders, took place on September 25, 1985, in West Los Angeles. The couple was killed by gunfire in the garage of their condominium as they arrived home from a festive meal at the conclusion of the Jewish holy day of Yom Kippur. Their sons, Neil and Stewart Woodman, were convicted of hiring Steve and Robert Homick to carry out the crime. All were convicted and sentenced.

== Killings ==
On September 25, 1985, the elder Woodmans were shot to death as they returned home from breaking the fast for Yom Kippur, held at Vera's sister's home. The killer was described by a witness as wearing a black ninja costume.

Large amounts of cash and jewelry remained on the Woodmans. A chain link fence bordering the property had been cut with a bolt cutter, and a bolt cutter later found in Homick's home was matched microscopically to cut-marks on the fence. A nearby hardware store owner remembered seeing Steve Homick purchase the tool.

== Suspects and motive ==
Neil and Stewart Woodman became suspects early on based on family accounts. The two sons of the victims had been estranged from their parents as a result of their handling of the family business. They had allegedly wrested control of the business away from their parents, leading to this animosity. Their rift was so strong that Neil hired security guards to keep his parents away from his son's bar mitzvah. Those guards mentioned to police Neil's conversations with Steve Homick, a former police officer, about him not wanting his parents present, and had suggested killing them.

The killings were motivated by a life insurance policy held by Vera Woodman that paid $500,000 to the company. At the time of the murders, the company had been millions of dollars in debt. The payment would not have been enough to resolve the debts of the company, but would provide the Woodman sons with funds.

== Trials and aftermath ==
Stewart Woodman was convicted in 1990. According to family members, Stewart Woodman succumbed to diabetes while still in prison on October 5, 2014, just after Yom Kippur (29 years after the murders). Neil Woodman was convicted in 1996.

Robert Homick was sentenced to life without parole. Steven Homick, who also had another murder conviction in Nevada, was sentenced to death in January 1995. He remained on death row at San Quentin State Prison in California for almost twenty years. On November 5, 2014, he died of natural causes in a nearby hospital.

The story of the murders and the investigation was featured on The New Detectives (Season 4, Episode 7: "Deadly Dealings"), LA Forensics, and Nothing Personal as well as the two-part made-for-TV movie Bloodlines: Murder in the Family.
