= Lifestyle Satellite Jukebox =

British music video request television channel

- Country: United Kingdom
- Broadcast area: Europe

Ownership
- Owner: WHSTV (WHSmith)

History
- Launched: late 1980s
- Closed: 24 January 1993

Lifestyle Satellite Jukebox was a British music video request television channel which was owned by the now defunct WHSTV (WHSmith).

In 1990, the channel moved to transponder 5 (Lifestyle/The Children's Channel) on the Astra satellite and shared transponder space with sister channel Lifestyle. Its broadcast hours were 10.00pm to 6.00am. LSJB was operated by a team of just 6 people, five of which worked out of a unit in Abingdon, Oxfordshire, UK. The music videos were changed once a month and sourced from LaserDisc that were custom recorded. Five Philips LaserDisc players were used to serve the video requests that came in from an interactive voice response (IVR) system. One Sony S-VHS player was added in the last year or so to serve adverts in between videos. The LaserDisc Player technology was used in Cable Jukebox that many Cable operators purchased and ran a dedicated channel using it.

The channel ceased broadcasting on 24 January 1993 following the closure of the Lifestyle Channel.
