= Screensport =

Former pan-European cable and satellite sports television network (1984–1993)

Screensport Sportkanal Sportnet TV Sport
- Country: Europe
- Broadcast area: United Kingdom

Programming
- Languages: Dutch; English; Spanish; French; German; Norwegian

Ownership
- Owner: WHSTV (WHSmith); ABC (7%); ESPN Inc.

History
- Launched: 29 March 1984
- Closed: 1 March 1993
- Replaced by: Eurosport

Screensport was a pan-European cable and satellite sports television network that was on air from 1984 until 1993 before merging with Eurosport. Europe's first sports channel, it was owned by WHSTV, who was, in turn, the owner of The European Sports Network (TESN).

== History ==
=== 1984–1986: Early years ===
Screensport was founded in 1981 by Bob Kennedy — who had started up BBC Radio Leicester, Sky Channel (operators of the UK's first satellite television network which later became known as Sky One) and several independent commercial radio stations, backers included the American networks ABC and ESPN (whose majority 80% share was acquired by ABC). A programming deal with Trans World International allowed access to events taking place around the world.

The channel began broadcasting on 29 March 1984, with Media Communications controlling the studios and transmission facilities in Knutsford, while its administration office was based in London. Apart from American sports, the station aired regular and weekly British sports including speedways and stock cars. Screensport aired only recorded programming until 31 August of that year, when they showed live greyhound racing from Wembley Stadium – including the St Leger. By late 1984, WHSmith Television Group had purchased a 15% stake in the company, RCA also acquired a 10% share in the business, with other investors including Ladbrokes and the pension fund of the National Coal Board. Former BBC executive Aubrey Singer was a prominent board member.

On 28 August 1985, the station started to expand its broadcasting area to include the Netherlands and Sweden, introducing new programmes and sports including ice speedway, Dutch ice hockey and motor sport. British professional wrestling promotion All Star Wrestling screened its matches on the channel for a year until gaining a share of editions of ITV's wrestling broadcasts. Coverage of English football began in the same year, screening the Area and National finals from the Freight Rover Trophy, a competition for lower division clubs. In addition, the channel both sponsored and broadcast the Football League Super Cup in the 1985–86 season. The competition was designed to compensate clubs who were banned from European competition due to the Heysel Stadium disaster, but it was scrapped after the first edition.

=== 1987–1992: WHSmith era ===
On 1 December 1986, the WHSmith Television Group took over the operation and management of the network when Bob Kennedy and ABC pulled out. By the end of that year, the station had lost £700,000 and no longer broadcast in Sweden, which resulted in a loss of 100,000 customers.

On 9 April 1987, as the channel had acquired rights to cover some major events, Screensport broadcast live coverage of the US Masters golf from Augusta, and many other PGA Tour events. Grand Slam tennis was also covered in the shape of the US Open. NHL ice hockey, NBA and NASCAR racing were common items on the schedule during this period. During the 1987–88 football season, Screensport was the only source of weekly extended English Football League highlights for viewers in the United Kingdom. The channel signed a deal with Thames Television, who were the Football League's agent for international distribution, to transmit 34 recorded matches via cable and satellite. Thames produced its programme, called the Big League Soccer.

On 7 December 1988, ESPN increased its stake in the channel from 3.5% to 25.5% after purchasing shares from WHSmith for £4.4 million. By then, Screensport had increased its sports content, allowing the channel to broadcast for 18.5 hours each day within the schedule included ice hockey, skiing, golf, tennis, and yachting. By 1989, Screensport adopted the sub-title The European Sports Network, while the WHSmith Television Group later renamed itself as WHSTV. The channel also began broadcasting on the Astra 1A satellite in February of that year, following a move of its operations from the north of England to central London, after taking full control of Molinare later that year on 17 May, which helped to operate as one channel under four different names:

- Screensport (English)
- TV Sport (French)
- Sportkanal (German)
- Sportnet (Dutch)

A consortium known as TESN bought the WHSTV unit, later known as the European Television Network, from WHSmith for £50 million in 1990. Shareholders in ETN now included the American Capital Cities/ABC, Groupe Canal+ of France, and a subsidiary of Generale des Eaux.

On 15 May 1991, Screensport filed with the Commission of the European Communities, alleging that the joint purchasing scheme for sporting events by Eurosport's former owners, Sky Television and the European Broadcasting Union, violated the competition (antitrust) law rules of the Treaty of Rome. After provisions were made for non-member access to the programming, the Commission granted the EBU in a five-year conditional exemption from the requirements of the competition rules. On 28 February 1992, Screensport forged an alliance with ITV Sport to bid for rights to coverage of the newly formed English Premier League. Sky Sports and the BBC were the eventual winners of the contract.

=== 1993: Merger and demise ===
ETN chief executive Rick Spinner began selling off assets of the parent company upon taking the post in July 1992.

On 14 January 1993, Eurosport and Screensport proposed a merger to provide a single channel as both were operating at a loss, hoping that a merged channel would become financially profitable. The merger finally took place on 1 March and that same day, Screensport was shut down permanently. It ended with a credit screen listing all the network's staff (akin to its sister channel Lifestyle's close on 24 January of that year), before cutting to Eurosport's feed surrounded by a notice telling viewers to watch any of its frequencies.

Finally on 6 March 1993 at 6.09am, Screensport's signal was shut down permanently as RTL 2 was launched in its transponder place.

== See also ==
- Eurosport
