= Journal of Elections, Public Opinion & Parties =

The Journal of Elections, Public Opinion & Parties (print: ISSN 1745-7289, online: ISSN 1745-7297) is a peer-reviewed academic journal covering research on elections, public opinion, participation, and political parties.
