= The Boot Street Band =

BBC children comedy television programme

- Country of origin: United Kingdom
- Original language: English
- No. of series: 2
- No. of episodes: 12

Production
- Running time: 22 min

Original release
- Network: BBC One
- Release: 11 November 1993 – 15 December 1994

The Boot Street Band was a BBC children comedy television programme which aired for two six-episode seasons in 1993–4. It was set in a school which appears to be run by the students, and was created by Andrew Davies and Steve Attridge. Steve Attridge wrote the second series and a book based on the idea. Idris Elba got his TV break by appearing in the series. Roland MacLeod played Mr Lear and Richard Davies played Mr Cramp.

== Episodes ==
=== Season 1 ===
No. in season	Title	Original release date
1	"Part One"	11 November 1993
2	"Part Two"	18 November 1993
3	"Part Three"	25 November 1993
4	"Part Four"	2 December 1993
5	"Part Five"	9 December 1993
6	"Part Six"	16 December 1993

=== Season 2 ===
No. in season	Title	Original release date
1	"The School Secretary"	10 November 1994
2	"New Brains for Old"	17 November 1994
3	"Take Away Trouble"	24 November 1994
4	"The Great Pretender"	1 December 1994
5	"Standing for Office"	8 December 1994
6	"The Great Exchange"	15 December 1994
