= Women of Today =

1950 British TV talk show

Women of Today is a 1950 British television talk show which aired on the BBC. It was described in the Radio Times as "A series of personal portraits". It was hosted by Jeanne Heal, and ran for about four episodes. It is unlikely that any of the episodes still exist, given the wiping of the era, as well as the fact that the BBC very rarely telerecorded shows prior to the mid-1950s.
