= Farmhouse Kitchen =

- Genre: Cooking programme
- Presented by: Dorothy Sleightholme; Grace Mulligan
- Theme music composer: Reg Wale
- Opening theme: 'Fruity Flutes'
- Country of origin: United Kingdom
- Original language: English

Production
- Production company: Yorkshire Television

Original release
- Network: ITV
- Release: 1971 – 1990

Farmhouse Kitchen is a cookery series that was produced by Yorkshire Television and aired on the ITV network from 1971 until 1990. It was hosted by Dorothy Sleightholme and later by Grace Mulligan.

The programme, which was shown weekly and usually on a weekday afternoon, was aimed at housewives and homemakers, and sought to educate its viewers by presenting visual demonstrations of old-fashioned British cookery as well as thrifty ways to feed a family on a budget. Yorkshire Television published a number of cookbooks containing recipes from the show: Farmhouse Kitchen (1975); Farmhouse Kitchen II (1978); Farmhouse Kitchen book 3 (1982); Farmhouse Kitchen microwave cook book: a fourth book based on the Independent Television series presented by Grace Mulligan (1986); Farmhouse Kitchen: cooking for one & two (1988).

Dorothy Sleightholme was born in 1911, and she retired from the programme at the end of 1981. She lived in Pickering, North Yorkshire. It has been mistakenly said in numerous articles that she died in a car accident, but this is not the case. A frequent guest to the programme, Grace Hugill from Bramham, West Yorkshire, died in a car accident on Saturday 1 November 1980. Dorothy Sleightholme died in 1983.

Grace Mulligan took over presenting duties in 1982. Celebrity guest cooks such as Mary Berry and Rick Stein were invited onto the programme, and viewers were invited to send in their own recipes to be cooked onscreen. Grace Mulligan died in 2018 at the age of 91.

The memorable, vibraphone-heavy theme music was "Fruity Flutes" by Reg Wale.
