= List of British films of 1993 =

A list of British films released in 1993.

== 1993 ==
Title	Director	Cast	Genre	Notes
1993
Anchoress	Chris Newby			Screened at the 1993 Cannes Film Festival
The Baby of Mâcon	Peter Greenaway	Julia Ormond, Ralph Fiennes, Philip Stone, Jonathan Lacey, Don Henderson	Historical drama	
Bad Behaviour	Les Blair	Stephen Rea, Sinéad Cusack	Comedy	
Bhaji on the Beach	Gurinder Chadha	Kim Vithana, Jimi Harkishin, Sarita Khajuria	Comedy drama	
Blue	Derek Jarman	John Quentin, Nigel Terry, Derek Jarman, Tilda Swinton	Documentary drama	Co-production with Japan
The Cement Garden	Andrew Birkin	Charlotte Gainsbourg, Andrew Robertson	Drama	Birkin won the Silver Bear for Best Director at Berlin.
Century	Stephen Poliakoff	Clive Owen, Charles Dance	Drama	
Dirty Weekend	Michael Winner	Lia Williams, Rufus Sewell	Thriller	
A Foreign Field	Charles Sturridge	Alec Guinness, Leo McKern	Drama	
The Higher Mortals	Colin Finbow	Jemima Rooper, Gordon Griffin, Susannah York, Clemency Burton-Hill	Drama	
The Hour of the Pig	Leslie Megahey	Colin Firth, Amina Annabi	Historical drama	
In the Name of the Father	Jim Sheridan	Daniel Day-Lewis, Emma Thompson	Drama	
Map of the Human Heart	Vincent Ward	Jason Scott Lee, Robert Joamie, Anne Parillaud	Drama	
Much Ado About Nothing	Kenneth Branagh	Emma Thompson, Kenneth Branagh, Keanu Reeves, Denzel Washington	Literary drama	Entered into the 1993 Cannes Film Festival
The Mystery of Edwin Drood	Timothy Forder	Gareth Arnold, Gemma Craven	Mystery	
Naked	Mike Leigh	David Thewlis, Lesley Sharp	Drama	Won two awards at Cannes
Once Upon a Forest	Charles Grosvenor	Michael Crawford, Ben Vereen, Ellen Blain	Animated drama	
Raining Stones	Ken Loach	Bruce Jones, Julie Brown, Ricky Tomlinson	Comedy drama	Won the Jury Prize at Cannes
The Remains of the Day	James Ivory	Anthony Hopkins, Emma Thompson, James Fox	Literary drama	
Ruby Cairo	Graeme Clifford	Andie MacDowell, Liam Neeson	Mystery	
Sankofa	Haile Gerima	Kofi Ghanaba, Oyafunmike Ogunlano, Alexandra Duah	Drama	
The Secret Adventures of Tom Thumb	Dave Borthwick	Nick Upton, Deborah Collar	Fantasy	
The Secret Garden	Agnieszka Holland	Kate Maberly, Heydon Prowse	Family	
The Secret Rapture	Howard Davies	Juliet Stevenson, Joanne Whalley	Drama	
Shadowlands	Richard Attenborough	Anthony Hopkins, Debra Winger	Drama	Based on the life of C. S. Lewis
Silent Cries	Anthony Page	Gena Rowlands, Annabeth Gish	War/drama	
Soft Top Hard Shoulder	Stefan Schwartz	Peter Capaldi, Elaine Collins, Richard Wilson, Frances Barber, Jeremy Northam, Phyllis Logan	Comedy	
Splitting Heirs	Robert Young	Eric Idle, Rick Moranis, Barbara Hershey	Comedy	
The Three Musketeers	Stephen Herek	Charlie Sheen, Kiefer Sutherland, Chris O'Donnell	Adventure	
The Trial	David Jones	Kyle MacLachlan, Anthony Hopkins, Juliet Stevenson	Drama	
We're Back! A Dinosaur's Story	Dick Zondag, Ralph Zondag, Phil Nibbelink, Simon Wells	John Goodman, Blaze Berdahl, Rhea Perlman, Jay Leno, René Le Vant, Felicity Kendal, Charles Fleischer, Walter Cronkite, Joey Shea, Julia Child, Kenneth Mars, Yeardley Smith, Martin Short	Animated adventure comedy	
Wide-Eyed and Legless	Richard Loncraine	Julie Walters, Jim Broadbent	Drama	
Wittenstein	Derek Jarman	Karl Johnson, Michael Gough, Tilda Swinton, John Quentin, Kevin Collins, Clancy Chassay, Nabil Shaban, Sally Dexter, Lynn Seymour	Comedy drama	Co-production with Japan
The Wrong Trousers	Nick Park	Peter Sallis	Animation	Wallace and Gromit short
The Young Americans	Danny Cannon	Harvey Keitel, Iain Glen	Crime drama	

== See also ==
- 1993 in film
- 1993 in British music
- 1993 in British radio
- 1993 in British television
- 1993 in the United Kingdom
- List of 1993 box office number-one films in the United Kingdom
