= 1993 in the United Kingdom =

Events from the year 1993 in the United Kingdom.

== Incumbents ==
- Monarch – Elizabeth II
- Prime Minister – John Major (Conservative)

== Events ==
=== January ===
- 1 January
  - Carlton Television, Meridian, Westcountry and GMTV begin broadcasting. Teletext Ltd. launches a new Teletext service on ITV and Channel 4, replacing the 14-year-old ORACLE teletext service.
  - Ben Silcock, an inadequately treated schizophrenic patient, enters the lion enclosure in London Zoo.
- 5 January – Oil tanker MV Braer runs aground on the South Mainland of Shetland, spilling 84,700 tonnes of crude oil into the sea.
- 6 January – The first episode of the children's series The Animals of Farthing Wood begins on BBC One.
- 8 January – Ford unveils its new Mondeo, a range of large family hatchbacks, saloons and estates which will reach showrooms on 22 March as a replacement for the long-running Sierra.
- 10 January
  - British newspapers carry reports that The Princess of Wales wants a divorce from The Prince of Wales, despite the announcement of their separation (issued the previous month) stating that there were no plans for a divorce.
  - Braer Storm at peak intensity across the British Isles, breaking up the wrecked tanker Braer.
- 11 January – British Airways admits liability and apologises "unreservedly" for a "dirty tricks" campaign against Virgin Atlantic.
- 13 January – Wayne Edwards, a 26-year-old Lance corporal, becomes the first British fatality in the conflict in Bosnia, former Yugoslavia.
- 21 January – Unemployment has increased for the 31st month running, but is still just short of the 3,000,000 total that was last seen nearly six years ago. Economists warn that it could hit a new high of more than 3,500,000 by the end of this year. However, the Conservatives have still managed to cut Labour's lead in the opinion polls from 13 points to eight points, according to the latest MORI poll.
- 26 January – The Bank of England lowers interest rates to 6% – the lowest since 1978.

=== February ===
- 1 February – Economists warn that unemployment could reach a new high of 3,400,000 this year.
- 12 February – Murder of James Bulger: a 2-year-old is abducted and murdered by two ten-year-old boys on Merseyside.
- 14 February – Unemployment is reported to be rising faster in Conservative seats than in Labour ones.
- 15 February – The number of unfit homes in Britain is reported to have increased from 900,000 to more than 1,300,000 between 1986 and 1991.
- 17 February – Shadow Chancellor Gordon Brown claims that a Labour Government could reduce taxation – a dramatic turn for a party known for high taxation.
- 18 February – Unemployment has reached 3,000,000 (and a rate of 10.6%) for the first time in six years.
- 19 February – Judith Chaplin, Conservative MP for Newbury in Berkshire, dies suddenly at the age of 53 after less than a year in Parliament.
- 20 February – Economists are now warning that unemployment could rise as high at 3,500,000 within the next year.
- 25 February – A MORI poll shows that 80% of Britons are dissatisfied with the way that John Major is running the country, and nearly 50% believe that the economy will get worse during this year.
- 25–26 February – Warrington bomb attacks: Provisional Irish Republican Army (IRA) bombs are planted and explode at gas holders in Warrington, Cheshire.

=== March ===
- 4 March – Former Cabinet minister Nicholas Ridley dies from lung cancer less than a year after retiring from the House of Commons, aged 64.
- 16 March – Chancellor Norman Lamont unveils a budget plan which is centred on economic recovery, together with phased introduction of Value-added tax on domestic fuel bills (8% for 1994). This will be the last Spring Budget.
- 19 March – Unemployment has fallen for the first time since May 1990, now standing at 2,970,000, sparking hopes that the recession is nearly over.
- 20 March – Warrington bomb attacks: IRA bombs in the town centre of Warrington claim the life of 3-year-old Jonathan Ball and injure more than 50 other people. On 25 March the blasts claim a second fatality when 12-year-old Timothy Parry dies in hospital from his injuries.
- 22 March – The Ford Mondeo goes on sale.

=== April ===
- April – Staples, an American office superstore chain, opens its first store in Britain in Swansea.
- 2 April – Vauxhall launches its all-new Corsa supermini, the replacement for the long-running Nova which like its predecessor is built at the Zaragoza plant in Spain.
- 3 April – A false start forces the Grand National to be cancelled. The race results are made void for the first time in history.
- 5 April
  - Child Support Agency begins operation.
  - Royal Logistic Corps formed within the British Army by union of five former corps: the Royal Engineers Postal and Courier Service, Royal Corps of Transport, Royal Army Ordnance Corps, Royal Pioneer Corps and Army Catering Corps.
- 22 April – Black London teenager Stephen Lawrence is stabbed to death at Eltham in south London while waiting for a bus.
- 24 April – Bishopsgate bombing. A massive IRA truck bomb explodes at Bishopsgate in the City of London. The blast destroys the medieval St Ethelburga's Church, and badly damages the NatWest Tower and Liverpool Street tube station. A newspaper photographer is killed.
- 26 April – Government declares official end of the recession after revealing that the economy grew by 0.6% in the first three months of this year. The recession began nearly three years ago and lasted much longer than most economists expected.
- 29 April – The Queen announces that Buckingham Palace will open to the public for the first time.

=== May ===
- 2 May – Manchester United become the first champions of the new FA Premier League after their last remaining title contenders, Aston Villa F.C., lose 1–0 at home to Oldham Athletic A.F.C.. It is the first time in 26 years that Manchester United have been champions of the top division of English Football.
- 7 May
  - The Conservatives lose a 12,357 majority in the Newbury by-election, with the Liberal Democrats gaining the seat by 22,055 votes under new MP David Rendel. The Conservative majority now stands at 19 seats.
  - Grimethorpe Colliery in South Yorkshire is closed.
- 13 May – Robert Adley, Conservative MP for Christchurch in Dorset, dies from a heart attack aged 58.
- 14 May – The economic recovery continues as business failures are reported to have fallen for the second quarter running.
- 20 May – The latest MORI poll shows that the Conservative Government has yet to benefit from bringing the economy out of recession, as they trail Labour (who have 44% of the vote) by 16 points.
- 22 May – Inflation reaches a 29-year low of 1.3%.
- 27 May – Kenneth Clarke succeeds Norman Lamont as Chancellor of the Exchequer.

=== June ===
- Sunday newspaper The Observer is acquired by Guardian Media Group.
- 3–5 June – Hollbeck Hall Hotel in Scarborough collapses into the sea following a landslide.
- 10 June – Comedian and TV presenter Les Dawson dies suddenly from a heart attack during a medical check-up in Greater Manchester hospital at the age of 62.
- 11 June – Actor and comedian Bernard Bresslaw dies suddenly from a heart attack following a collapse in his dressing room at London's Open Air Theatre at the age of 59.
- 17 June – Unemployment now stands at less than 2,900,000 after the fourth successive monthly fall.
- 20 June – A high speed train makes the first journey from France to England via the Channel Tunnel, which will open to the public next year.
- 21 June – Andrew Wiles announces a proof to Fermat's Last Theorem at the Isaac Newton Institute. The proof is slightly flawed, but Wiles announces a revised proof the following year.
- 24 June
  - Northern Ireland Minister Michael Mates resigns over links with fugitive tycoon Asil Nadir.
  - Despite the recent end of the recession, support for the Conservative Government has failed to recover, with the latest MORI poll showing that Labour has an 18-point lead over them with 46% of the vote.
- 30 June – Michael Hunt, former deputy chairman of Nissan UK, is jailed for eight years for his involvement in Britain's worst case of tax fraud.

=== July ===
- July – The public sector trade union UNISON is formed by merger of the National and Local Government Officers' Association (NALGO), the National Union of Public Employees (NUPE) and the Confederation of Health Service Employees (COHSE).
- 12 July – The British-Kenyan journalist Dan Eldon, 22, is attacked and killed by the natives in Somalia following the Abdi House raid, during the Somali Civil War.
- 16 July – MI5 publishes a booklet, The Security Service, revealing publicly for the first time its activities, operations and duties, as well as photographs of Stella Rimington as Director General.
- 22 July – Government almost defeated by "Maastricht Rebels"; however, a vote of no confidence does not succeed.
- 29 July – Conservative Party loses the Christchurch by-election to the Liberal Democrats – a seat they have held since 1910. New MP Diana Maddock gains more than 60% of the vote – twice as many as the Conservative Candidate Robert Hayward. This sees the Conservative Parliamentary majority fall to 17 seats.

=== August ===
- 4 August – Labour Party leader John Smith opens Millwall F.C.'s New Den stadium in Bermondsey, London, which cost £16million to build and is the largest new football stadium to be built in England since before World War II.
- 11 August – The Department of Health reveals that the number of people on hospital waiting lists has reached 1,000,000 for the first time.

=== September ===
- 3 September – The UK Independence Party, which supports breakaway from the European Union, is formed by members of the Anti-Federalist League, which itself was formed two years earlier by opponents of Britain's involvement in the Maastricht Treaty.
- 16 September – Unemployment has risen for the second month running, now standing at 2,922,100 (10.4% of the workforce), sparking fears that the economic recovery could be stalling and the economy could soon slide back into recession just months after coming out of it.
- 17 September – The British National Party wins its first council seat, in the London Borough of Tower Hamlets.
- 19 September – Production of the Ford Orion compact saloon ends.
- 30 September – The Queen approves an Honorary Knighthood for General Colin Powell, who the day before retired as Chief of United States Armed Forces.

=== October ===
- 1 October – QVC launches the first television shopping channel in the UK.
- 3 October – The Northern Irish journalist Rory Peck, 36, is shot and killed outside the Ostankino TV Centre in Moscow by Boris Yeltsin's loyalists while covering the 1993 Russian constitutional crisis.
- 8 October – John Major launches his Back to Basics campaign.
- 16 October – Demonstration against the British National Party in Welling, where it has its headquarters.
- Unemployment falls this month by 49,000 – the biggest monthly fall since April 1989 – as the economic recovery continues.

=== November ===
- 1 November – Women's Royal Naval Service disbanded, its members being fully absorbed into the regular Royal Navy.
- 5 November – Civil servants stage a one-day strike.
- 9 November – Princess Diana sues the Daily Mirror over photographs that were taken of her at a gym.
- 17 November – The England national football team fails to qualify for the World Cup in America next summer, despite winning their final qualifying match 7–1 against San Marino. National Manager Graham Taylor is expected to leave the job imminently. The Welsh National Side also missed out on a place in the World Cup after Paul Bodin misses a penalty in a 2–1 defeat at home to Romania. At the Welsh game, a 67-year-old fan is killed by a rocket flare let off in the stands at Cardiff Arms Park.
- 18 November – M40 minibus crash: In the early hours of the morning, ten children and a woman teacher from Hagley RC High School in Worcestershire are killed in a minibus crash on the M40 motorway near Warwick. An eleventh child dies in hospital several hours later and a twelfth in hospital as a result of their injuries on the following day, leaving just two girls surviving.
- 24 November
  - Graham Taylor resigns as manager of the England Football Team after three years in charge.
  - Two boys, now aged 11, are convicted of the murder of James Bulger and publicly named, becoming the youngest convicted murderers of the 20th century.
- 25 November – TV entertainer Roy Castle, 61, announces that he is suffering from a recurrence of the lung cancer which he was believed to have overcome one year ago.
- 29 November – The Conservative Government comes under a vitriolic attack in the House of Commons over allegations that it has secret contacts with the Provisional Irish Republican Army.

=== December ===
- 3 December – Diana, Princess of Wales, announces her withdrawal from public life.
- 9 December – Despite the steady economic recovery, the Conservative Government is now 18 points behind Labour (who have 47% of the vote) in the latest MORI poll. The Liberal Democrats have also eaten into their support and now have 20% of the vote.
- 10 December
  - Richard J. Roberts wins the Nobel Prize in Physiology or Medicine jointly with Phillip Allen Sharp "for their discoveries of split genes".
  - Last shift at Monkwearmouth Colliery, ending coal mining in the Durham Coalfield after at least 700 years.
- 14 December – Yasser Arafat, Chairman of the Palestine Liberation Organization, makes his first official visit to Britain.
- 15 December – The Downing Street Declaration on the future of Northern Ireland is signed between the UK and Irish Governments.
- 25 December – The Queen speaks of her hopes for peace in Northern Ireland in her Christmas Day speech.
- 29 December – The Provisional IRA vows to fight on against the British presence in Northern Ireland.

=== Undated ===
- Completion of Thames Water Ring Main beneath London (80 km).
- New car sales enjoy an increase this year for the first time since 1989. The Ford Escort is Britain's best selling car for the second year running, while the new Ford Mondeo and Vauxhall Corsa enjoy strong sales in their first year on the British market.
- With the economy growing for the first time since spring 1990, inflation is at a 33-year low of 1.6%.

== Publications ==
- Simon Armitage's poetry collection Book of Matches.
- Iain Banks' novel Complicity.
- Iain M. Banks' novel Against a Dark Background.
- Pat Barker's novel The Eye in the Door.
- Terry Deary's The Terrible Tudors, first in the Horrible Histories series.
- Sebastian Faulks' novel Birdsong.
- John McCarthy and Jill Morrell's account of his more than five years as a hostage in Lebanon Some Other Rainbow.
- Terry Pratchett's Discworld novel Men at Arms and his Johnny Maxwell novel Johnny and the Dead.
- Minette Walters' novel The Sculptress.
- Irvine Welsh's novel Trainspotting.

== Births ==
- 1 January – Jon Flanagan, footballer
- 5 January – Franz Drameh, actor
- 10 January – Jacob Scipio, actor and writer
- 11 January – Michael Keane, footballer
- 12 January – Zayn Malik, pop singer-songwriter, member of One Direction
- 13 January – Max Whitlock, gymnast
- 21 January – John Cofie, footballer
- 22 January – Tommy Knight, actor
- 28 January – Will Poulter, actor
- 30 January – Katy Marchant, track cyclist
- 4 February – Sam Hoskins, footballer
- 10 February
  - Jack Butland, English footballer
  - Greg Kaziboni, Zimbabwe-born footballer
- 12 February – Benik Afobe, English footballer
- 15 February – Ben Foakes, English cricketer
- 5 March – Harry Maguire, footballer
- 9 March – George Baldock, footballer (d. 2024)
- 11 March – Jodie Comer, actress
- 13 March – Tyrone Mings, footballer
- 16 March – George Ford, England rugby union player
- 24 March – Grace Cassidy, actress
- 8 April – TBJZL, YouTuber
- 9 April – Will Merrick, actor
- 11 April – Tom Aspinall, mixed martial artist
- 18 April – Nathan Sykes, singer
- 19 April – Sebastian de Souza, English actor
- 24 April
  - Ben Davies, Welsh footballer
  - Abigail Thorn, actress and YouTuber
- 6 May – Naomi Scott, actress, singer and musician
- 9 May – Laura Muir, Scottish middle-distance runner
- 10 May – Charlotte Owen, Baroness Owen of Alderley Edge, politician
- 12 May – Ali Price, Scotland rugby union player
- 13 May – Finn Harries, vlogger, designer and entrepreneur
- 16 May – Josephine Gordon, jockey
- 22 May – Edward Bluemel, actor
- 28 May – Jonnie Peacock, sprinter
- 7 June – George Ezra, singer-songwriter
- 14 June – Callum McGregor, Scottish footballer
- 19 June – KSI, YouTube personality
- 23 June – Syndicate, YouTuber and Twitch streamer
- 25 June – Barney Clark, actor
- 29 June
  - Fran Kirby, footballer
  - George Sampson, English street dancer, presenter, dancer, singer and actor
- 6 July – Melissa Steel, singer
- 16 July – Katie McGlynn, actress
- 22 July – Amber Beattie, actress
- 23 July – Joivan Wade, actor
- 26 July – Stormzy (Michael Ebenazer Kwadjo Omari Owuo Jr.), grime rapper
- 27 July
  - Alexandra Mardell, actress
  - Max Power, footballer
  - George Shelley, actor and singer
- 28 July
  - Harry Kane, footballer
  - Cher Lloyd, pop singer
  - Moses Odubajo, footballer
- 15 August – Alex Oxlade-Chamberlain, footballer
- 21 August – Millie Bright, footballer
- 29 August – Liam Payne, pop singer-songwriter, member of One Direction (died 2024)
- 13 September – Niall Horan, Irish-born pop guitarist, member of One Direction
- 15 September – Fady Elsayed, actor
- 17 September – Alfie Deyes, vlogger
- 18 September – Charlie Taylor, footballer
- 20 October – David Bolarinwa, sprinter
- 9 November – Pete Dunne, wrestler and promoter
- 25 November – Danny Kent, motorcycle racer
- 30 November – Cherry Valentine, drag queen (died 2022)
- 5 December – Ross Barkley, footballer
- 19 December – Hermione Corfield, actress
- 27 December – Olivia Cooke, actress

== Deaths ==
=== January ===
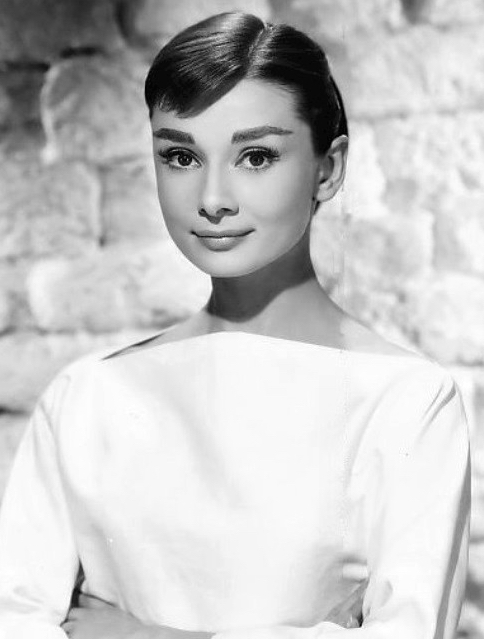
Audrey Hepburn

- 1 January – Cathie Marsh, sociologist and statistician (born 1951)
- 2 January – Sean Devereux, missionary and aid worker (born 1964); murdered in Somalia
- 7 January – Sir John Cowley, Army lieutenant-general (born 1905)
- 8 January – George Rudé, Marxist historian (born 1910)
- 9 January
  - Bruce Campbell, ornithologist (born 1912)
  - Janet Vaughan, physiologist (born 1899)
- 11 January – Tommy Walker, Scottish footballer (born 1915)
- 14 January
  - Victor Warrender, 1st Baron Bruntisfield, politician (born 1899)
  - Ben Warriss, actor and comedian (born 1909)
- 15 January – Arthur Wallis Exell, botanist (born 1901)
- 16 January – Florence Desmond, actress (born 1905)
- 17 January – Albert Hourani, historian (born 1915)
- 18 January
  - Eleanor Alice Burford, novelist (born 1906)
  - Gordon Higginson, spiritual medium (born 1918)
- 19 January – Sir Reginald Hewetson, Army general (born 1908)
- 20 January – Audrey Hepburn, actress (born 1929); died in Switzerland
- 21 January – Delia de Leon, Panamanian-born actress (born 1901)
- 24 January – Sir Henry Abel Smith, British Army officer and World War II veteran (born 1900)
- 28 January
  - Sir Donald Douglas, academic surgeon (born 1911)
  - Oliver Poole, 1st Baron Poole, politician and businessman (born 1911)
- 30 January – Dorothy Miles, Welsh poet (born 1931)
- 31 January – John Poulson, businessman (born 1900)

=== February ===
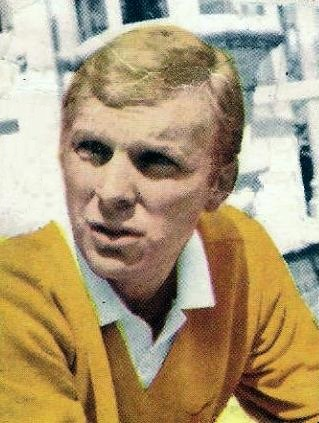
Bobby Moore

- 2 February – Bernard Braden, actor and comedian (born 1916, Canada)
- 5 February
  - Sidney Bernstein, Baron Bernstein, businessman, founder of Granada Television (born 1899)
  - Tip Tipping, stuntman and actor (born 1958); parachute accident
  - Jack Young, English cricketer (born 1912)
- 6 February – Sir George Bellew, herald (born 1899)
- 9 February – Bill Grundy, journalist (born 1923)
- 13 February
  - G. H. Diggle, chess player (born 1902)
  - Willoughby Gray, actor (born 1916)
- 14 February – Eric Lionel Mascall, Anglican priest and theologian (born 1905)
- 17 February – Leslie Townsend, English cricketer (born 1903)
- 18 February
  - Jacqueline Hill, actress (born 1929)
  - Leslie Norman, film director (born 1911)
- 19 February – Judith Chaplin, politician (born 1939)
- 21 February
  - Alison Fairlie, scholar (born 1917)
  - Dick White, intelligence officer, Director-General of MI5 (1953–1956) (born 1906)
- 24 February – Bobby Moore, English footballer (born 1941)
- 25 February – Dave Cook, communist activist (born 1941); road accident in Turkey
- 28 February – Joyce Carey, actress (born 1898)

=== March ===
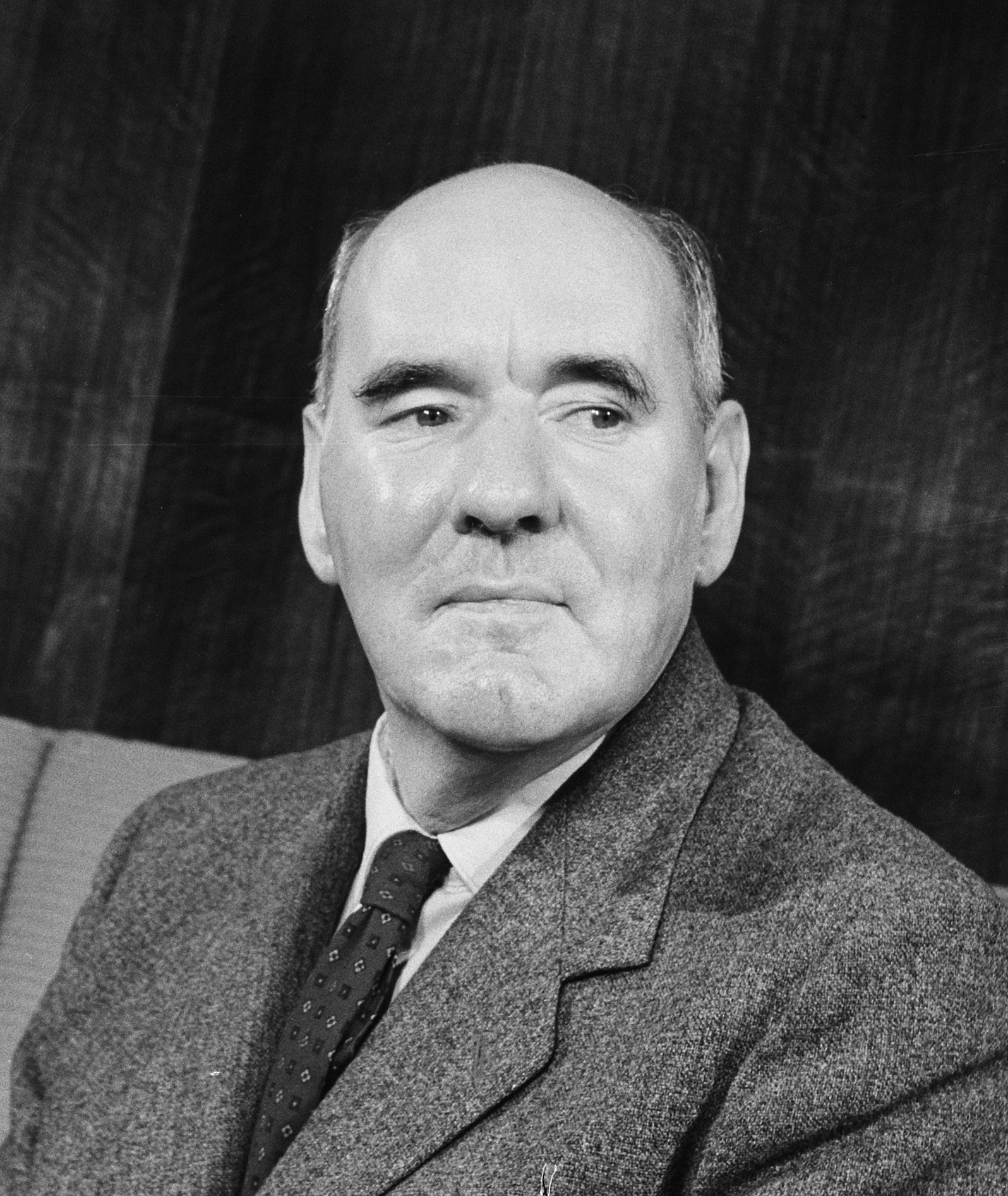
C. Northcote Parkinson

- 3 March – Tony Bland, football supporter injured in Hillsborough disaster in 1989 allowed to die after a landmark legal challenge by his family (born 1970)
- 4 March – Nicholas Ridley, Baron Ridley of Liddesdale, politician, Secretary of State for Transport (1983–1986), Secretary of State for the Environment (1986–1989) and Secretary of State for Trade and Industry (1989–1990) (born 1929)
- 5 March – Robert McCance, paediatrician, biochemist and nutritionist (born 1898)
- 6 March – Andrew Gilchrist, diplomat (born 1910)
- 7 March
  - Richard Fortescue, 7th Earl Fortescue, peer (born 1922)
  - Patricia Lawrence, actress (born 1925)
  - Jeremy Tree, racehorse trainer (born 1925)
- 9 March – C. Northcote Parkinson, historian (born 1909)
- 13 March – Ann Way, actress (born 1915)
- 14 March – Harold Soref, politician (born 1916)
- 16 March – Gordon Donaldson, historian (born 1913)
- 17 March
  - Charlotte Hughes, longest-lived person ever documented in the UK (born 1877)
  - Sir Edward Warburton Jones, lawyer, judge and politician (born 1912)
- 21 March – Digby Tatham-Warter, British Army officer (born 1917)
- 24 March
  - Alice Bacon, Baroness Bacon, politician (born 1909)
  - Karen Gershon, author and poet (born 1923, Germany)
- 29 March – Sir John Rodgers, 1st Baronet, politician (born 1906)
- 31 March – Ailwyn Fellowes, 3rd Baron de Ramsey, peer (born 1910)

=== April ===
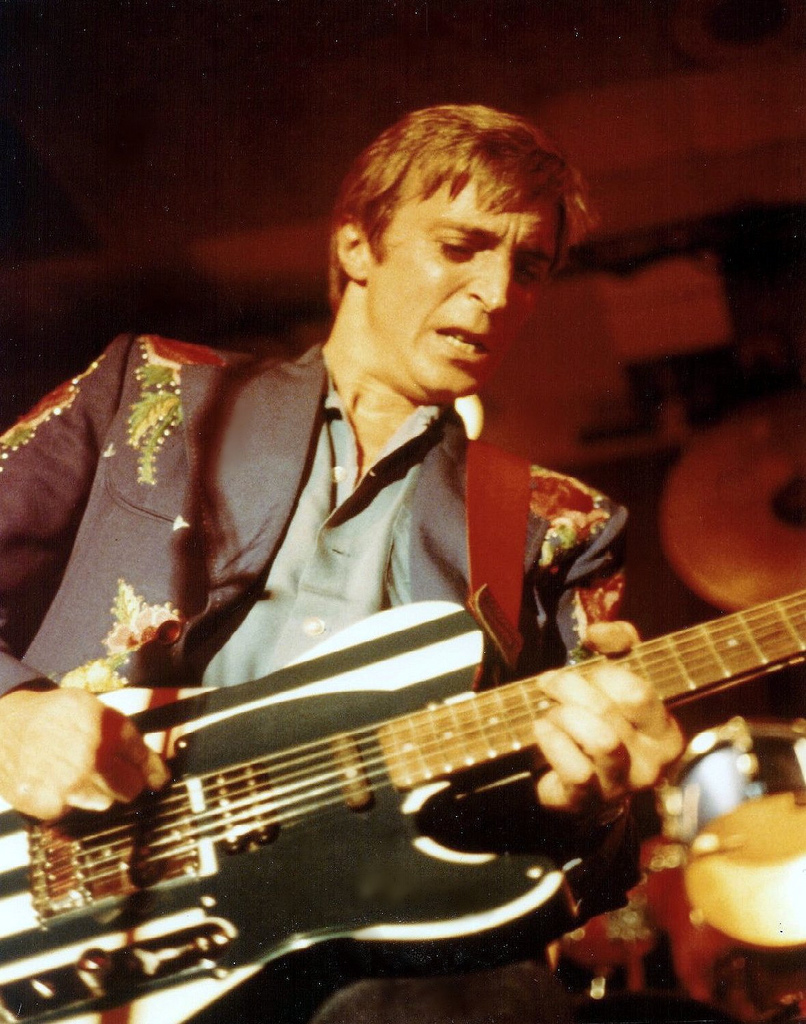
Mick Ronson

- 1 April – Solly Zuckerman, Baron Zuckerman, zoologist and public servant (born 1904)
- 4 April – Charles Elworthy, Baron Elworthy, British Royal Air Force commander (born 1911)
- 6 April – Charles Burkill, mathematician (born 1900)
- 7 April – Terry Price, Welsh rugby player (born 1945); road accident
- 9 April – Jess Yates, television presenter (born 1918)
- 10 April – Donald Broadbent, psychologist (born 1926)
- 15 April
  - Leslie Charteris, novelist and screenwriter (born 1907)
  - Robert Westall, children's fiction writer (born 1929)
- 18 April – Dame Elisabeth Frink, sculptor (born 1930)
- 20 April – Rowland Hilder, artist (born 1905)
- 22 April – Stephen Lawrence, student (born 1974); murdered
- 23 April – Daniel Jones, composer (born 1912)
- 24 April – Sir Ian Jacob, Army general and broadcasting executive (born 1899)
- 26 April – Bob Broadbent, cricketer (born 1924)
- 29 April
  - Mick Ronson, guitarist (The Spiders from Mars) (born 1946)
  - Robert Bertram Serjeant, scholar, traveller and Arabist (born 1915)
- 30 April – Tommy Caton, footballer (born 1962)

=== May ===
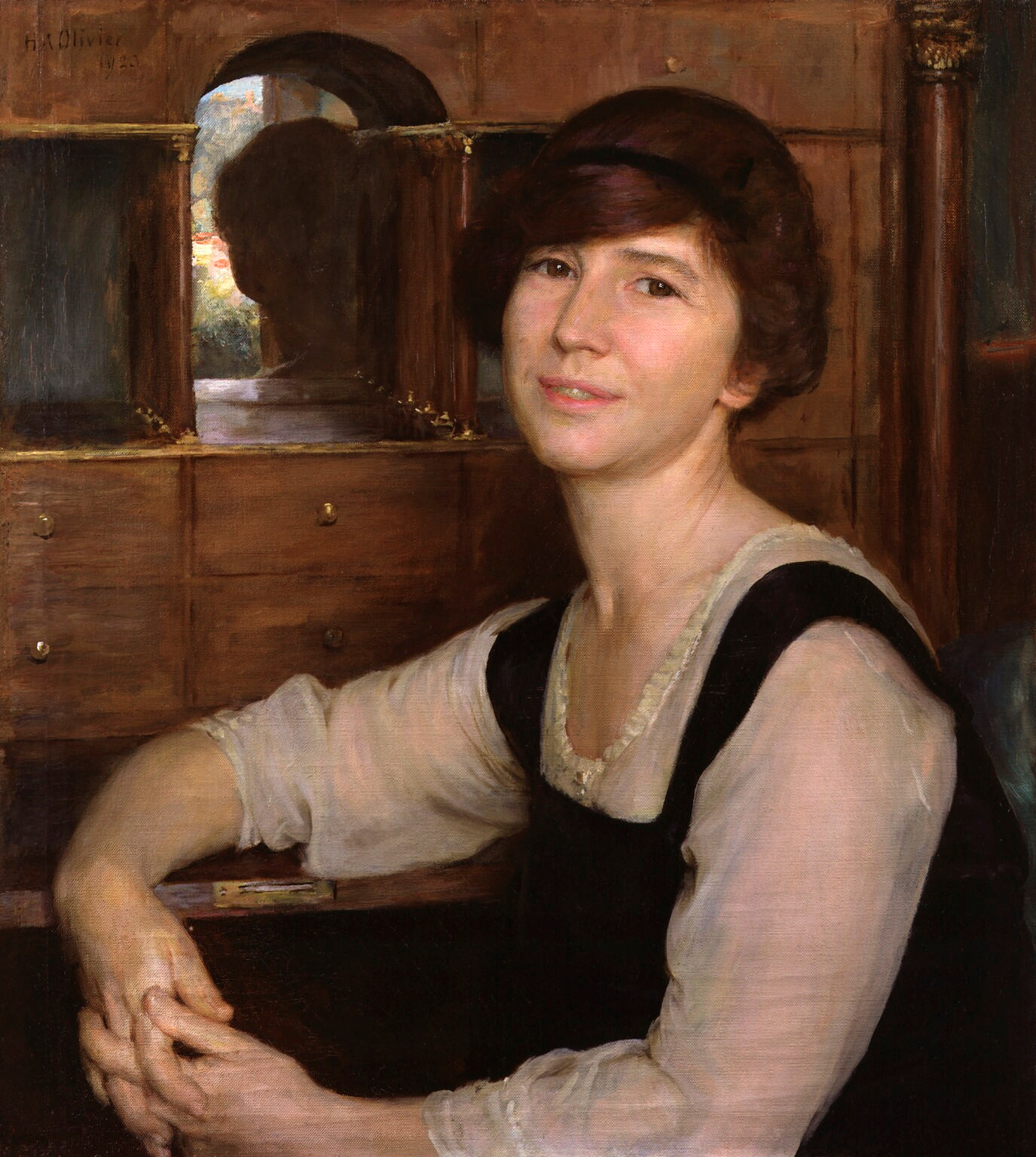
Freya Stark

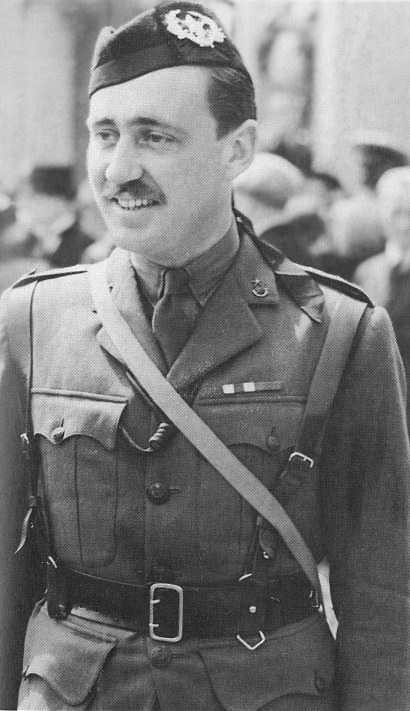
John Frost

- 1 May – Gerry Fowler, politician (born 1935)
- 5 May – Sir Dermot Boyle, British Royal Air Force commander (born 1904)
- 6 May
  - Ivy Benson, bandleader (born 1913)
  - Ian Mikardo, politician (born 1908)
- 8 May – Edward Ward, 7th Viscount Bangor, peer (born 1905)
- 9 May
  - Penelope Gilliatt, novelist and screenwriter (born 1932)
  - Maggie Hemingway, novelist (born 1946)
  - Dame Freya Stark, explorer and travel writer (born 1893)
- 12 May – John Treasure Jones, naval captain, last master of RMS Queen Mary (born 1905)
- 13 May
  - Robert Adley, politician and writer (born 1935)
  - Bede Griffiths, Benedictine monk (born 1906)
- 17 May – Elizabeth Wilmot, costume designer (born 1902)
- 21 May – John Frost, British Army officer and Battle of Arnhem veteran (born 1912)
- 22 May – David Rees, author (born 1936)
- 27 May – Roger MacDougall, screenwriter and playwright (born 1910)
- 28 May
  - Duncan Browne, singer-songwriter (born 1947)
  - Derek Hersey, rock climber (born 1956); climbing accident
- 30 May – Mel Rees, footballer (born 1968)

=== June ===
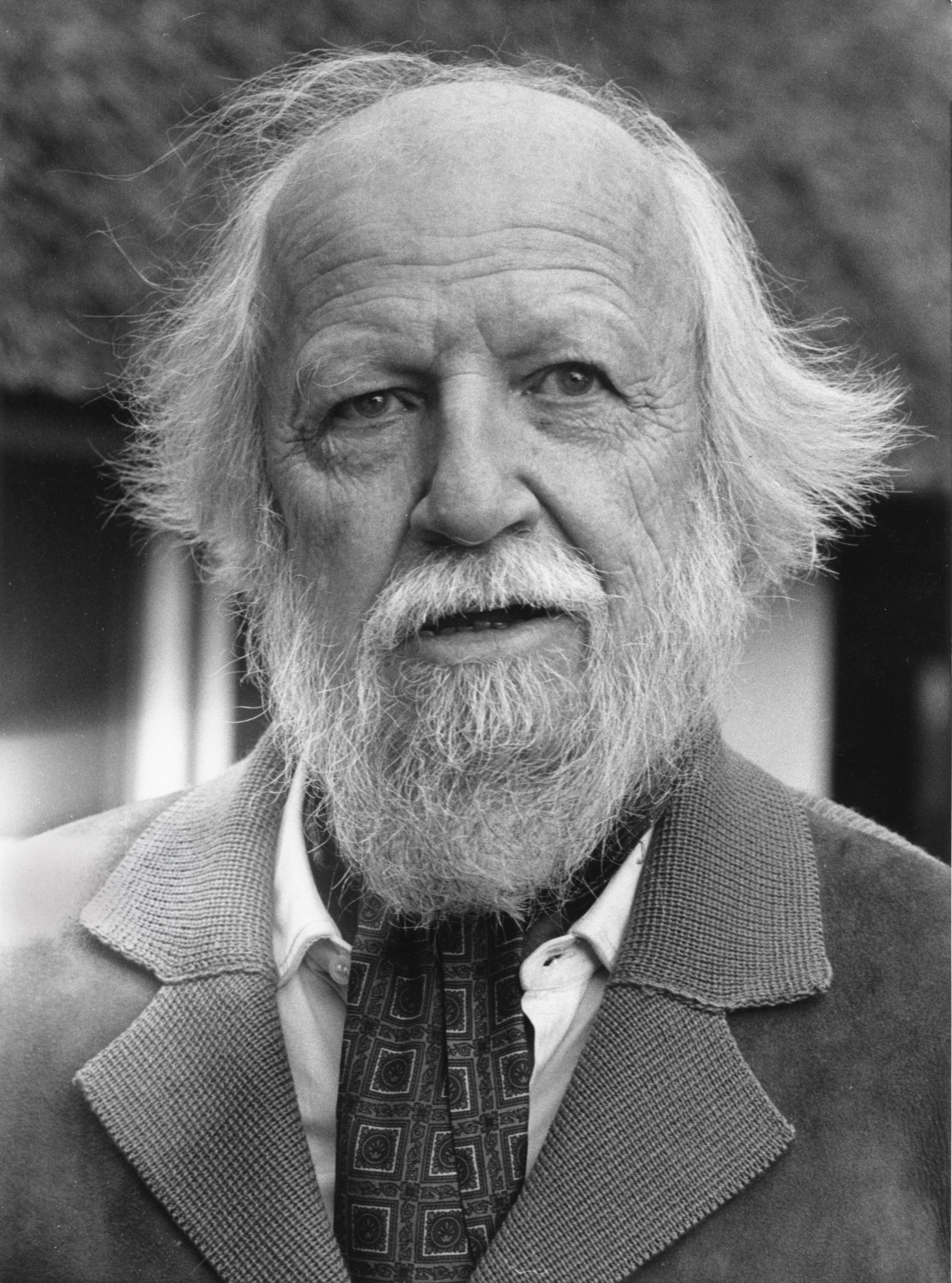
William Golding

- 1 June – Austin Robinson, economist (born 1897)
- 4 June
  - Molly Drake, poet and musician (born 1915)
  - Eric Trist, social scientist (born 1909)
- 5 June – George Strauss, Baron Strauss, politician, Father of the House of Commons (1974–1979) (born 1901)
- 6 June – Sir Richard Norman, chemist (born 1932)
- 9 June – Samuel Finer, historian (born 1915)
- 10 June
  - Les Dawson, comedian (born 1931)
  - Archie Macaulay, Scottish footballer and manager (born 1915)
- 11 June
  - M. C. Bradbrook, literary scholar (born 1909)
  - Bernard Bresslaw, actor (born 1934)
- 15 June – James Hunt, racing driver and media commentator (born 1947)
- 19 June – William Golding, novelist, Nobel Prize laureate (born 1911)
- 21 June
  - Colin Dixon, Welsh rugby player (born 1943)
  - Al Fairweather, jazz trumpeter (born 1927)
- 22 June – Victor Maddern, actor (born 1928)
- 23 June – Flora Bramley, actress and comedian (born 1904)

=== July ===
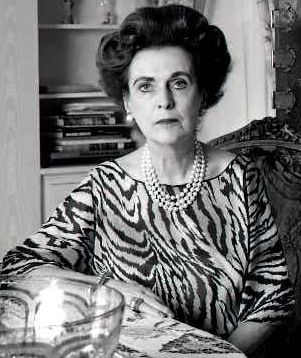
Margaret Campbell, Duchess of Argyll

- 1 July – Tom Berry, rugby union player and manager (born 1911)
- 6 July
  - John Gatenby Bolton, astronomer (born 1922)
  - Ruth Roche, Baroness Fermoy, lady-in-waiting and maternal grandmother of Diana, Princess of Wales (born 1908)
  - Michael Rothenstein, painter, printmaker and art teacher (born 1908)
- 8 July – John Riseley-Pritchard, racing driver (born 1924)
- 12 July – Dan Eldon, journalist (born 1970); murdered in Somalia
- 15 July – Bert Greeves, motorcycle pioneer (born 1906)
- 18 July – Michael Winstanley, Baron Winstanley, politician (born 1918)
- 19 July – Gordon Gray, Scottish cardinal (born 1910)
- 21 July – John Crichton-Stuart, 6th Marquess of Bute, peer and art collector (born 1933)
- 23 July
  - Florence Nightingale David, statistician (born 1909)
  - Megan Taylor, Olympic figure skater (born 1920)
- 25 July – Margaret Campbell, Duchess of Argyll, Scottish noblewoman (born 1912)
- 27 July – T. Dan Smith, politician (born 1915)
- 28 July – Jack Browne, Baron Craigton, politician (born 1904)

=== August ===
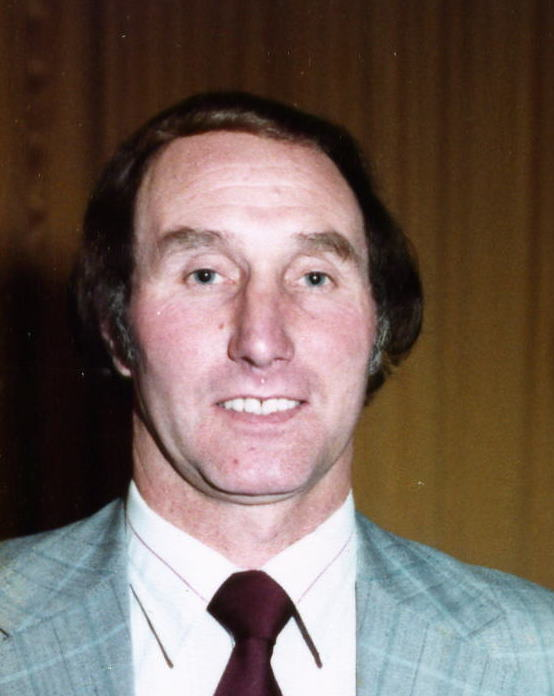
Tony Barton

- 1 August – Gerry Sundquist, actor (born 1955); suicide
- 2 August – Sir Nigel Henderson, British Royal Navy admiral, Chairman of the NATO Military Committee (1968–1971) (born 1909)
- 3 August – James Donald, actor (born 1917)
- 7 August – Roy Budd, jazz pianist and composer (born 1947)
- 10 August – Diana Holman-Hunt, writer and art critic (born 1913)
- 11 August – Philip Martell, composer (born 1907)
- 15 August – Patricia St. John, novelist (born 1919)
- 16 August
  - Ernest Fernyhough, politician (born 1908)
  - Stewart Granger, actor (born 1913)
  - Joan Hughes, test pilot (born 1918)
  - Ethelwynn Trewavas, ichthyologist (born 1900)
- 18 August – Tony Barwick, television scriptwriter (born 1934)
- 20 August – Tony Barton, English footballer, coach and manager (born 1937)
- 24 August – George Cansdale, zoologist, writer and television presenter (born 1909)
- 25 August – Mildred Creak, child psychiatrist (born 1898)
- 28 August
  - George Appleton, Anglican prelate and writer (born 1902)
  - Rene Ray, Countess of Midleton, actress (born 1911)
  - E. P. Thompson, historian and peace activist (born 1924)
- 30 August
  - Ian Folley, English cricketer (born 1963); accident while playing
  - Sir Anthony Plowman, judge (born 1905)

=== September ===
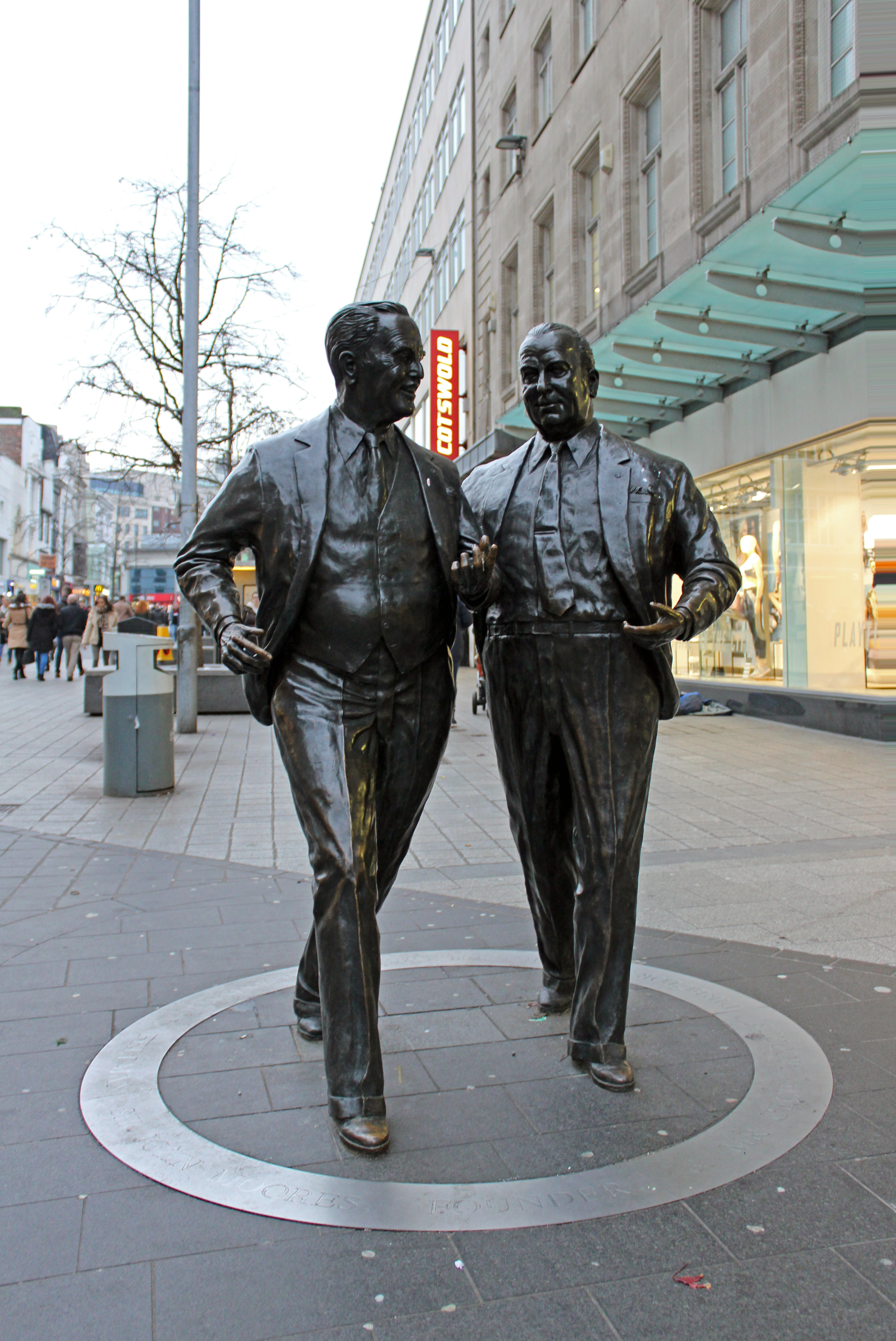
Sir John Moores (left)

- 1 September
  - Thomas Brodie, Army major-general (born 1903)
  - Hew Lorimer, sculptor (born 1907)
  - Michael Sobell, businessman and breeder of racehorses (born 1892)
- 2 September – Eric Berry, actor (born 1913)
- 4 September – Tommy Cheadle, English footballer (born 1919)
- 5 September – Edwin Malindine, politician (born 1910)
- 6 September – A. L. F. Rivet, archaeologist and cartographer (born 1915)
- 12 September – Harold Innocent, actor (born 1933)
- 14 September
  - Adrianne Allen, actress (born 1907)
  - Sheelagh Murnaghan, Northern Irish politician (born 1924)
  - Peter Tranchell, composer (born 1932)
- 19 September – Helen Adam, poet, collagist and photographer (born 1909)
- 20 September – Leonard Parkin, television newsreader (born 1929)
- 23 September – Myer Galpern, politician (born 1903)
- 24 September – Tamara Talbot Rice, art historian (born 1904, Russian Empire)
- 25 September – Sir John Moores, businessman, founder and chairman of Littlewoods 1923-1977 and 1980-1982 (born 1896)
- 30 September
  - Ronnie Aldrich, jazz musician (born 1916)
  - Alex Lyon, politician (born 1931)

=== October ===
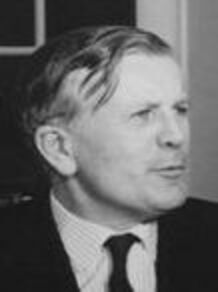
Jo Grimond

- 3 October – Rory Peck, journalist (born 1956); murdered in Russia
- 4 October – Jim Holton, Scottish footballer (born 1951)
- 7 October – Ivor Bulmer-Thomas, journalist and scientific writer (born 1905)
- 8 October – Peter Conder, ornithologist and conservationist (born 1919)
- 10 October
  - John Bindon, actor and bodyguard (born 1943)
  - Keith Murray, Baron Murray of Newhaven, academic (born 1903)
- 11 October – Andy Stewart, singer and musician (born 1933)
- 12 October – Patrick Holt, actor (born 1912)
- 22 October – Innes Ireland, soldier and motor racing driver (born 1930)
- 23 October – Wilhelm Feldberg, physiologist and biologist (born 1900, German Empire)
- 24 October – Jo Grimond, politician, Leader of the Liberal Party (1956–1967) (born 1913)
- 26 October – Maurice Henry Dorman, diplomat (born 1912)
- 27 October
  - Peter Quennell, writer, biographer and literary historian (born 1905)
  - Peter Tizard, paediatrician and professor (born 1916)
- 30 October
  - Peter Kemp, Spanish Civil War veteran and writer (born 1913)
  - Margaret Vyner, model and actress (born 1914, Australia)

=== November ===
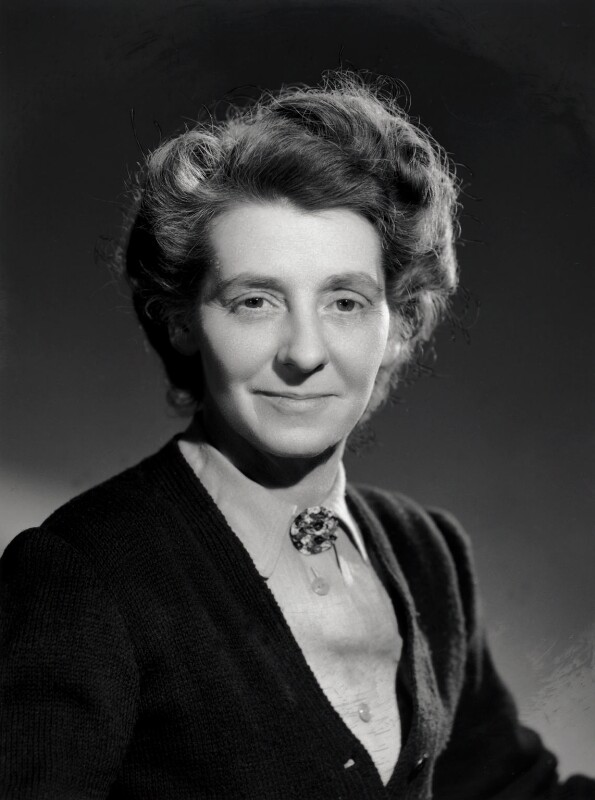
Freda Corbet

- 1 November
  - Freda Corbet, politician (born 1900)
  - Loelia Lindsay, socialite and magazine editor (born 1902)
  - A. N. Sherwin-White, ancient historian (born 1911)
- 3 November
  - H. G. Callan, zoologist and cytologist (born 1917)
  - Aidan Crawley, journalist, television executive and politician (born 1908)
  - Duncan Gibbins, film director and screenwriter (born 1952); accidentally burnt
- 5 November – Michael Bilton, actor (born 1919)
- 8 November – James Moffat, novelist (born 1922, Canada)
- 9 November
  - Godfrey Lienhardt, anthropologist (born 1921)
  - Angus Maude, Baron Maude of Stratford-upon-Avon, politician (born 1912)
  - Stanley Myers, film composer (born 1930)
  - Anne Smith, Olympic athlete (1964) (born 1941)
- 13 November – Sir George Taylor, botanist, director of the Royal Botanic Gardens (1956–1971) (born 1904)
- 19 November – Christopher Frank, British-born French screenwriter (born 1942)
- 21 November
  - Margaret Boyd, lacrosse player and schoolteacher (born 1913)
  - Richard Wordsworth, actor (born 1915)
- 22 November – Anthony Burgess, novelist and composer (born 1917)
- 24 November – John Blythe, actor (born 1921)
- 28 November
  - Kenneth Connor, comic actor (born 1918)
  - Tommie Connor, songwriter (born 1904)
  - Bruce Turner, jazz musician (born 1922)
- 29 November
  - Alan Clare, jazz pianist and composer (born 1921)
  - Sir Jack Longland, educator, mountain climber and broadcaster (born 1905)
- 30 November – Wogan Philipps, 2nd Baron Milford, only Communist member of the House of Lords (born 1902)

=== December ===
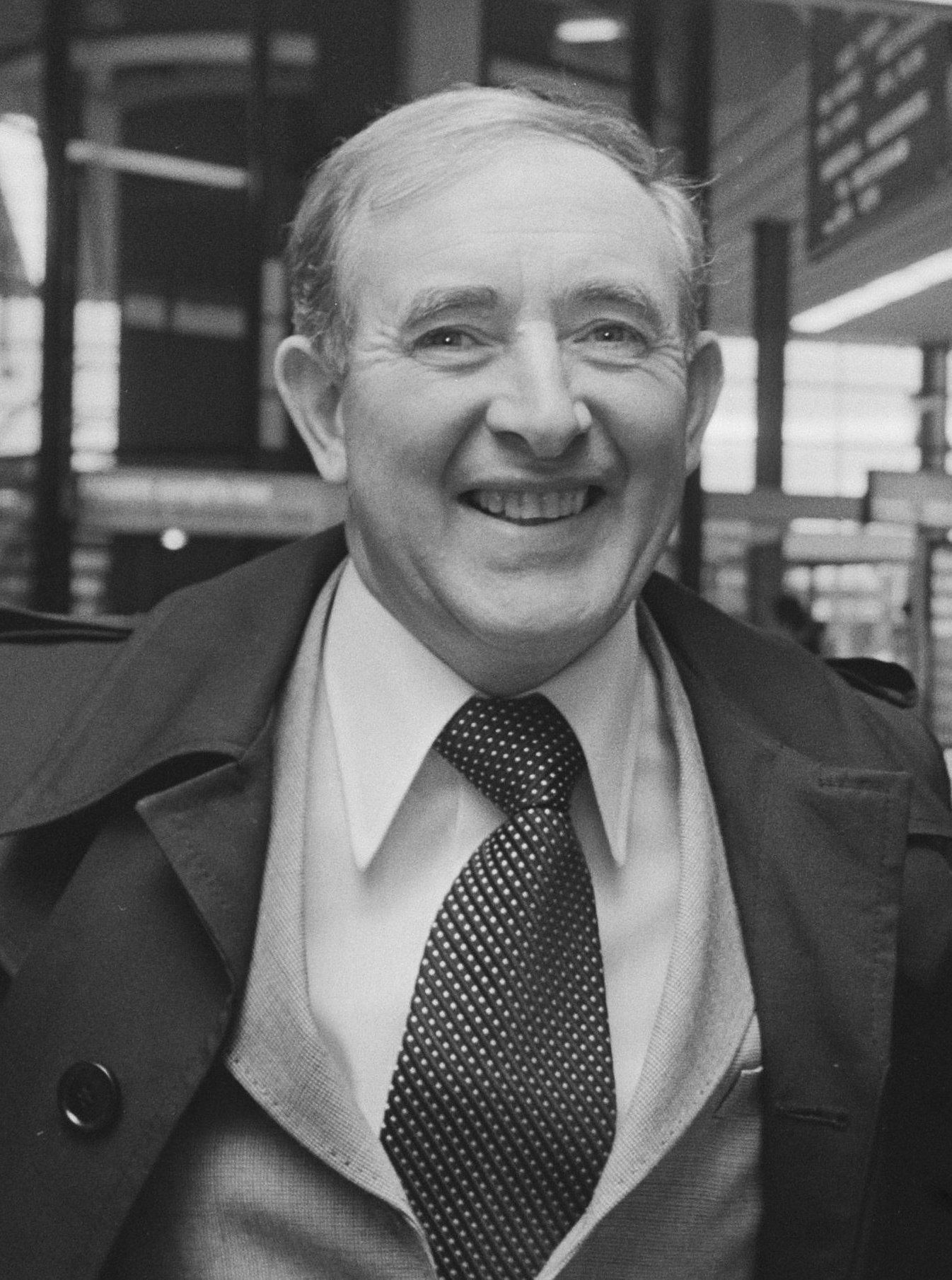
Danny Blanchflower

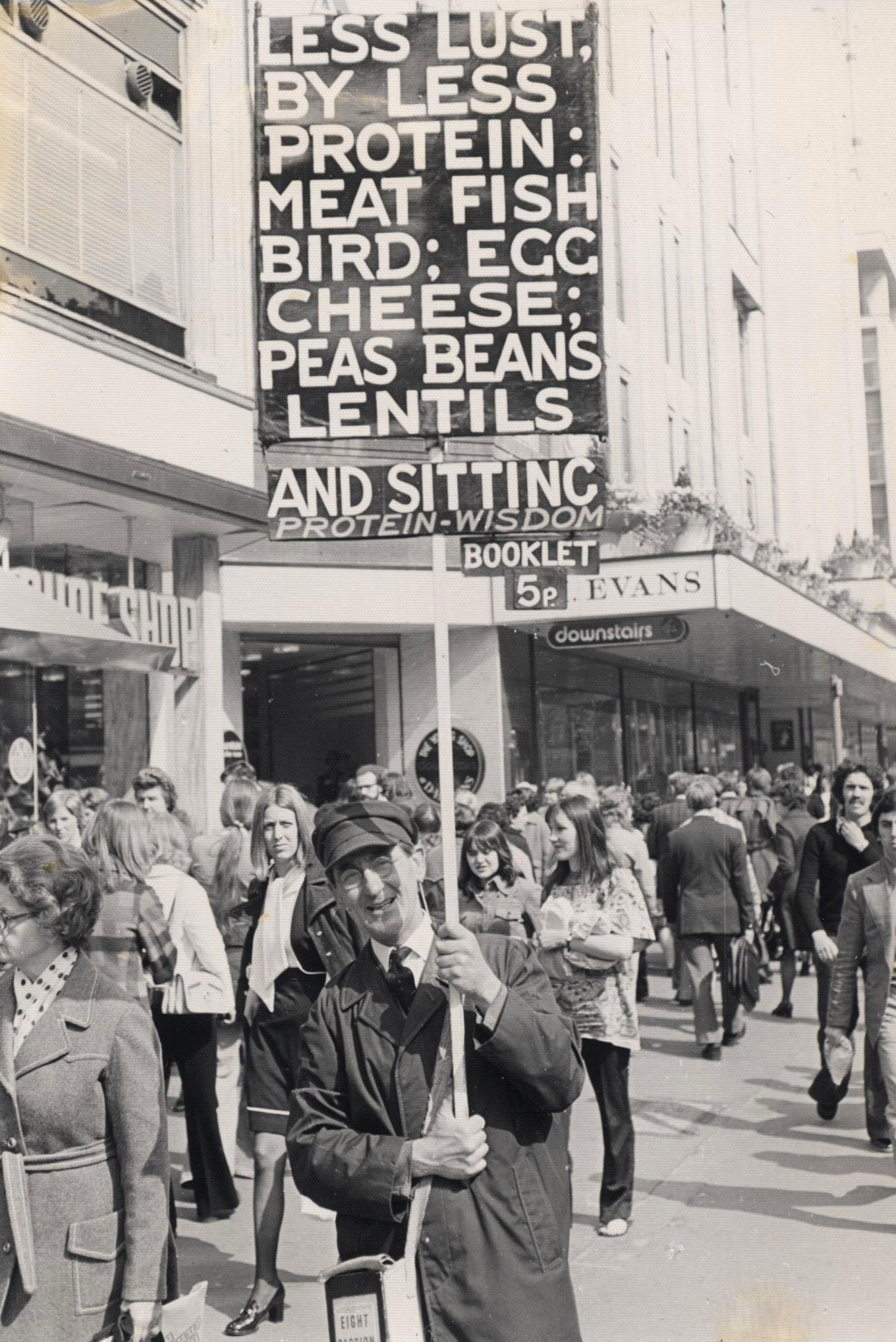
Stanley Green

- 1 December
  - Lynette Davies, actress (born 1948); suicide
  - Edwin Flavell, Army brigadier-general (born 1898)
  - Mary Lobel, historian (born 1900)
- 2 December
  - Harry Julius Emeléus, organic chemist (born 1903)
  - John Kershaw, screenwriter (born 1931)
- 4 December – Hugh Moore, police officer (born 1929)
- 6 December – Bryson Graham, rock drummer (born 1952)
- 9 December
  - Danny Blanchflower, footballer, manager and writer (born 1926)
  - John Wisdom, philosopher (born 1904)
- 12 December
  - Joan Cross, opera singer (born 1900)
  - Stanley Green, activist (born 1915)
- 14 December – Francis Jones, historian and herald (born 1908)
- 18 December – Joe Carstairs, power boat racer (born 1900)
- 19 December – Owain Owain, Welsh novelist (born 1929)
- 20 December – Sir Philip Christison, Army general (born 1893)
- 24 December – Ralph Downes, organist and music director (born 1904)
- 28 December – Jennifer Lash, novelist and painter (born 1938)

== See also ==
- 1993 in British music
- 1993 in British television
- List of British films of 1993
