= 1993 in British radio =

This is a list of events in British radio during 1993.

== Events ==
=== January ===
- 4 January – Terry Wogan returns to the Radio 2 breakfast slot with Wake Up to Wogan.

=== February ===
- No events.

=== March ===
- March – After nearly 15 years of presenting The Friday Rock Show on BBC Radio 1, Tommy Vance leaves the station to go to the forthcoming Virgin 1215.

=== April ===
- 3 April – Shortly after midnight BBC Radio 2 airs the final edition of its weeknight jazz programme, Jazz Parade. The programme is presented by Digby Fairweather and features the BBC Big Band conducted by Barry Forgie.
- 5 April – BBC Radio Bedfordshire expands to cover the counties of Buckinghamshire and Hertfordshire and is renamed BBC Three Counties Radio.
- 18 April – The Official 1 FM Album Chart show is broadcast on BBC Radio 1 for the first time. Presented by Lynn Parsons, the 60-minute programme is broadcast on Sunday evenings, straight after the Top 40 singles chart.
- 26 April – BBC Dorset FM launches as an opt-out station from BBC Radio Devon. The station broadcasts to the west and centre of the county – east Dorset was already covered by BBC Radio Solent. This is the last BBC local radio station to launch in an area previously not covered by a BBC local station.
- 30 April – Launch of Virgin 1215, Britain's second national commercial radio station, on Radio 3's old mediumwave frequency. The station starts broadcasting at 12.15 pm.

=== May ===
- 2 May – As part of its launch schedule, new national commercial station Virgin 1215 launches a weekly album chart show.
- May – The broadcasting arrangements for Test Match Special are changed for the 1993 cricket season. The morning play is on BBC Radio 5, switching to BBC Radio 3 for the afternoon session.

=== June ===
- No events.

=== July ===
- 25 July – The last Network Chart Show goes out on Independent Local Radio.
- Undated in July – Midland Radio Plc, which owns six stations, including BRMB, is acquired by GWR.

=== August ===
- 1 August – 'Doctor' Neil Fox introduces the first Pepsi Chart, a Sunday afternoon Top 40 Countdown show for commercial radio, and based on single sales and airplay. The programme was aired until December 2002.
- 8 August – Dave Lee Travis resigns on air from BBC Radio 1, stating that he could not agree with changes that were being made to the station. Travis told his audience that changes were afoot that he could not tolerate "and I really want to put the record straight at this point and I thought you ought to know – changes are being made here which go against my principles and I just cannot agree with them".
- 16 August – Les Ross returns to the BRMB breakfast show following a shake up of scheduling at BRMB and its sister station Xtra AM.
- 16 August–20 September – Loud'n'proud, a series presented by DJ Paulette on BBC Radio 1, is the UK's first national radio series aimed at a gay audience.
- 23 August – Cricket is broadcast on BBC Radio 3 for the final time.
- 30 August – On August Bank Holiday Monday, BRMB holds its "Party in the Square", an event featuring a music concert in Birmingham's Centenary Square, which is attended by 23,000 people. The city's largest pop music event at the time, it is the forerunner to the annual "Party in the Park" held for a number of years afterwards.

=== September ===
- 3 September – Simon Mayo leaves the Radio 1 Breakfast Show after five years in the chair. He is replaced by Mark Goodier who presents the show until the end of the year.
- 19 September – BBC Radio 3 broadcasts the soundtrack to Derek Jarman's film Blue simultaneously with its screening on Channel 4 television so viewers can hear it in stereo.
- Undated in September – The Radio Authority announces that it will not be renewing either of LBC's licences, a rare refusal to renew the licence of an incumbent station. The new licensee is to be London News Radio, a consortium led by former LBC staff and backed by Guinness Mahon.

=== October ===
- Undated in October
  - Matthew Bannister takes over from Johnny Beerling as controller of Radio 1 and immediately makes major changes to the station's output in order to attract a younger audience. Major changes are made to the presenter line-up with long standing DJs, including Simon Bates, Gary Davies, Bob Harris and Alan Freeman, replaced with a raft of new younger presenters.
  - BBC Radio Clwyd closes although local news opt-outs for north east Wales continue until 2002.
  - Sunset 102 goes into liquidation.
- 25 October – John Inverdale joins BBC Radio 5 to present a new sports drivetime show. It replaces Five Aside which had been on air since the station launched.
- 30 October
  - As part of the roll-out of the new Radio 1 schedule, Andy Kershaw and John Peel move from nighttime to Saturday afternoons, Danny Baker takes over the weekend morning show and the first Essential Mix is broadcast.
  - Radio Rovers launches, and therefore becomes the first dedicated football club radio station in the United Kingdom. The station provides matchday coverage for all of Blackburn Rovers FC's home games.
  - The BBC announces that its new rolling news service will launch on MW, and not on long wave, as originally intended. The station will replace BBC Radio 5 and the service will also include BBC Radio's existing sports coverage.

=== November ===
- 1 November – Liz Kershaw presents the first edition of a new BBC Radio 5 lunchtime show called The Crunch. Consequently, BFBS Worldwide moves to the mid-afternoon slot.
- Undated in November
  - Michele Stevens replaces Danny Baker as the presenter of BBC Radio 5's breakfast programme Morning Edition.
  - BBC GLR stops broadcasting on MW.

=== December ===
- 18 December – BBC 2 broadcasts the Arena special "Radio Night", an ambitious simulcast with BBC Radio 4.
- 24 December – Steve Wright in the Afternoon ends its 13-year run on Radio 1 (although it will return to its slot in 1999).

=== Unknown ===
- BBC GMR stops broadcasting on MW.
- London station WNK closes. It had shared a frequency with London Greek Radio. WNK's closure allows London Greek Radio to begin full time broadcasts.

== Station debuts ==
- 18 January – Signal Gold
- 1 March – The Bay
- 5 April – BBC Three Counties Radio
- 14 April – CFM
- 26 April – BBC Dorset FM
- 30 April – Virgin 1215
- 1 May – Ten 17
- 21 May – Star FM
- May – Country Music Radio
- 1 July – Radio Maldwyn
- 27 August – Marcher Coast
- 4 September – Wessex FM
- 7 October – Yorkshire Coast Radio
- 17 October – SGR Colchester
- 21 October – Q102.9
- 30 October – Radio Rovers

== Programme debuts ==
- 4 January – Wake Up to Wogan on BBC Radio 2 (1993–2009)
- 27 March – Armando Iannucci on BBC Radio 1 (1993–1994)
- 22 April – The Masterson Inheritance on BBC Radio 4 (1993–1995)
- 1 August – The Pepsi Chart syndicated from 95.8 Capital FM (1993–2002)
- 13 August – Struck Off and Die on BBC Radio 4 (1993–1994, 2000)
- 17 September – Hair in the Gate on BBC Radio 4 (1993–1996)
- 11 October – The Shuttleworths on BBC Radio 4 (1993–2010)
- 30 October – Essential Mix on BBC Radio 1 (1993–Present)
- 11 November – Harry Hill's Fruit Corner on BBC Radio 4 (1993–1997)
- Lee and Herring's Fist of Fun on BBC Radio 1 (transferred to television 1995)

== Continuing radio programmes ==
=== 1940s ===
- Sunday Half Hour (1940–2018)
- Desert Island Discs (1942–Present)
- Letter from America (1946–2004)
- Woman's Hour (1946–Present)
- A Book at Bedtime (1949–Present)

=== 1950s ===
- The Archers (1950–Present)
- The Today Programme (1957–Present)
- Sing Something Simple (1959–2001)
- Your Hundred Best Tunes (1959–2007)

=== 1960s ===
- Farming Today (1960–Present)
- In Touch (1961–Present)
- The World at One (1965–Present)
- The Official Chart (1967–Present)
- Just a Minute (1967–Present)
- The Living World (1968–Present)
- The Organist Entertains (1969–2018)

=== 1970s ===
- PM (1970–Present)
- Start the Week (1970–Present)
- Week Ending (1970–1998)
- You and Yours (1970–Present)
- I'm Sorry I Haven't a Clue (1972–Present)
- Good Morning Scotland (1973–Present)
- Kaleidoscope (1973–1998)
- Newsbeat (1973–Present)
- The News Huddlines (1975–2001)
- File on 4 (1977–Present)
- Money Box (1977–Present)
- The News Quiz (1977–Present)
- Breakaway (1979–1998)
- Feedback (1979–Present)
- The Food Programme (1979–Present)
- Science in Action (1979–Present)

=== 1980s ===
- In Business (1983–Present)
- Sounds of the 60s (1983–Present)
- Loose Ends (1986–Present)

=== 1990s ===
- Formula Five (1990–1994)
- The Moral Maze (1990–Present)
- Essential Selection (1991–Present)
- No Commitments (1992–2007)
- Room 101 (1992–1994)
- The Mark Steel Solution (1992–1996)

== Ending this year ==
- 5 January – Knowing Me Knowing You with Alan Partridge (1992–1993)
- 3 April – Jazz Parade (1990–1993)
- 24 December – Steve Wright in the Afternoon on BBC Radio 1 (1981–1993)

== Closing this year ==
- August – Sunset 102 (1989–1993)
- October – BBC Radio Clwyd (1980–1993)
- Unknown – WNK (1989–1993)

== Births ==
- 28 January – Roman Kemp, radio music presenter
- 19 April – Kenny Allstar, DJ

== Deaths ==
- 9 February – Richard Imison, 56, script editor for BBC Radio Drama (1963–1991)
- 29 November – Jack Longland, 88, radio broadcaster, educationalist and mountaineer

== See also ==
- 1993 in British music
- 1993 in British television
- 1993 in the United Kingdom
- List of British films of 1993
