= Daemon (film) =

- Directed by: Colin Finbow
- Written by: Colin Finbow
- Produced by: Children's Film Unit; Colin Finbox
- Starring: Susannah York; Bert Parnaby; Arnaud Morell
- Cinematography: Titus Bicknell
- Music by: David Hewson
- Release date: 1985
- Country: United Kingdom
- Language: English

Daemon is a 1985 British horror film about a young man who is possessed by a demon. It was written and directed by Colin Finbow and starred Susannah York, Bert Parnaby and Arnaud Morell. It is a ghost story set in suburbia.

The film was produced by the Children's Film Unit, which made films aimed at young audiences.

== Synopsis ==
Eleven-year-old Nick moves into a large old house with his sisters Jennie and Clare, left in the care of Helga the Swedish au pair while their parents are away in America. Nick is unhappy at his new school, where he is befriended by a boy called Sam and intimidated by scripture teacher Mr Crabb, who is interested in the occult and demonology. Nick hears voices in the house and receives messages on his computer screen. He also suffers inexplicable blisters on his feet and grazes on his elbows and knees. When he dreams of burning and wakes up in a bed full of ashes, Nick tells a psychiatrist (Susannah York) that he feels he is possessed by a demon. Three of his schoolmates agree and, when Crabb dies in a freak accident, resolve to drive a stake through his heart. However, the cause of the haunting turns out to be Tom, a child chimney sweep from 1839 who was burned to death in the house's chimney. After a climactic fire, Tom's skeleton is discovered in the old fireplace and the ghost is laid to rest.

The symptoms that Nick and his friend interpret as those of demonic possession the blisters, grazes and fiery nightmares actually turn out to be down to his psychic sympathy with Tom, who was burned alive while crawling up a Victorian chimney. This revelation of human cruelty and injustice lurking within supernatural manifestations allows for a finale that is satisfyingly apocalyptic on a small scale.

== Reception ==
Time Out reviewed Daemon, stating that it is "bound to grip young audiences". In his book British Children's Cinema: From the Thief of Bagdad to Wallace and Gromit, Noel Brown states that the film "raises issues of alienation and depression among young people. while satirising the portentousness and moral binaries of supposedly more 'adult' films."
