= Ysgol Aberconwy =

School in North Wales

Location
- Morfa Drive; Conwy, LL32 8ED; Wales; 53°17′12″N 3°50′15″W

Information
- Established: 1960
- Local authority: Conwy County Borough
- Specialist: CReSTeD Registered
- Staff: 180 (approximate)
- Age: 11 to 18+
- Enrolment: 1083 (2025)
- Language: English
- Colour: rainbow
- Website: Ysgol Aberconwy

Ysgol Aberconwy is a medium-sized, mixed comprehensive school for ages 11 to 18, on the Conwy estuary on the North Wales coast. The school is two minutes from the A55 Expressway linking Chester to North Wales.

Ian Gerrard BSc was appointed headteacher at the beginning of the 2014–15 academic year. Pupils are divided into four houses, each with a corresponding colour on the uniform: Crafnant-green, Hiraethlyn-blue, Dulyn-yellow, Llugwy-red

== Curriculum ==
English, Welsh, Maths, Science and Physical Education are compulsory until the end of Year 11. All other subjects are optional after Year 9. Pupils Welsh Bacc, begin their GCSE studies at the beginning of Year 10.

Whilst Ysgol Aberconwy does not offer any specialist subjects, pupils in Years 10–13 may study courses at Llandrillo College, such as Retail Management, Catering, Fine Art, Graphic Art, Health and Beauty, Fashion and Textiles, Photography, Applied IT, Further Maths, Human Biology, and Geology.

== Uniform ==
The school uniform for the lower school (years 7 to 11) is a dark navy sweater with the school crest, a white polo neck shirt with a collar in the colour of the pupil's house, black trousers or skirt, and dark shoes. The Sixth Form uniform consists of a grey V-neck jumper with the school crest, a white collared shirt and a blue and gold tie, dark trousers or skirt and plain black shoes.

== Sports Centre ==
The school buildings include a sports centre with a sports hall, climbing wall and AstroTurf football pitch.

== Notable former pupils ==
- Paula Yates - deceased television presenter
- James Roscoe (diplomat) - British Ambassador
