= James Roscoe (diplomat) =

British diplomat

James Roscoe LVO
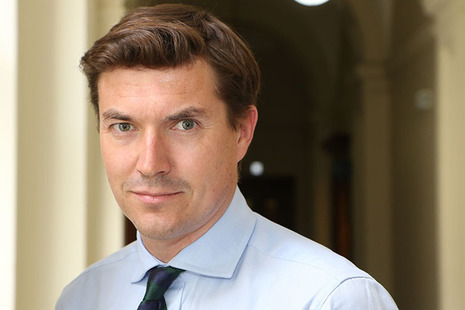

British Chargé d'affaires ad interim to the United States
- In office 11 September 2025 – 2 February 2026
- Monarch: Charles III
- Prime Minister: Sir Keir Starmer
- Preceded by: Peter Mandelson
- Succeeded by: Sir Christian Turner
- In office 2 February 2025 – 10 February 2025
- Preceded by: Karen Pierce
- Succeeded by: Peter Mandelson

Deputy British Ambassador to the United States
- In office July 2022 – May 2026
- Monarchs: Elizabeth II; Charles III
- Prime Minister: Boris Johnson; Liz Truss; Rishi Sunak; Sir Keir Starmer
- Preceded by: Michael Tatham

British Ambassador to the UN General Assembly
- In office 2019 – July 2022
- Monarch: Elizabeth II
- Prime Minister: Theresa May; Boris Johnson

Personal details
- Born: 1975 or 1976 (age 50–51) St David's Hospital; Bangor, Gwynedd
- Spouse: Clemency Burton-Hill
- Children: 2
- Relatives: Humphrey Burton (father-in-law)
- Education: St John's College, Durham

James Paul Roscoe (born 1976) is a British diplomat who served as the Deputy British Ambassador to the United States from July 2022 to May 2026.

He previously served as British Chargé d'affaires ad interim to the United States in February 2025 between the departure of Karen Pierce as British ambassador and the appointment of Peter Mandelson, and between September 2025 and February 2026 following the dismissal of Mandelson.

== Career ==
Roscoe has previously worked for His Majesty's Diplomatic Service in Iraq, Sierra Leone and the UK Mission to the UN. Between 2006 and 2009, Roscoe was the chief press officer to prime ministers Tony Blair and Gordon Brown. He served as communications secretary to Queen Elizabeth II from 2013 to 2016. In 2017, he joined the Department for Exiting the European Union as Communication Director and from 2019 to 2022 was the United Kingdom’s Ambassador to the General Assembly of the United Nations in New York. Roscoe was appointed Deputy Head of Mission at the British Embassy in Washington D.C. in July 2022.

In September 2025, Roscoe became chargé d'affaires ad interim to the United States for the second time following the dismissal of Peter Mandelson as ambassador by prime minister Keir Starmer, amid controversy surrounding Mandelson's association with the convicted sex offenders Jeffrey Epstein and Ghislaine Maxwell. He previously served in that position in February 2025, between the departure of Karen Pierce and the appointment of Mandelson. Roscoe was also under consideration for the role of permanent Ambassador to the United States, alongside a number of other candidates including Mark Sedwill, Richard Moore and Lindsay Croisdale-Appleby.

On 19 May 2026, the UK Foreign Office announced that he no longer held the post of Deputy British Ambassador to the United States.

== Early and personal life ==
Roscoe was born in Bangor, Wales, though spent most of his childhood in South Africa where he attended the Diocesan College (Bishops) in Rondebosch (Cape Town, South Africa). On his return to the United Kingdom he attended Ysgol Aberconwy in Conwy, Wales, and maintains close connections to Conwy. He met his wife, BBC presenter Clemency Burton-Hill (daughter of BBC broadcaster and director Sir Humphrey Burton) in Sierra Leone in 2006, and has two sons.

== Honours ==
Roscoe was appointed a Member of the Royal Victorian Order (MVO) in the 2017 New Year Honours. He was promoted to Lieutenant of the same Order on 30 April 2026 during the State Visit of The King and Queen to the United States.
