= Colin Finbow =

British film director and screenwriter (born 1940)

- Colin Finbow on location for "Doombeach" (1989) Photograph by Kit Ellis
- Born: 26 November 1940 (age 85); Ipswich, Suffolk, England
- Occupations: film director screenwriter

Colin Finbow (born 26 November 1940) is an English screenwriter and film director.

== Life and career ==
He was studying at Ipswich College of Art and London's Goldsmiths College and made amateur films as a teenager. He submitted his first plays to radio and wrote for the stage.

Finbow also was Head of English at London's Forest Hill Comprehensive School. In 1981 the Children's Film Unit was formed as a registered charity which he oversaw. It had begun life as the film studies department at Forest Hill School in South East London.

== Selected filmography ==
- Something Wicked This Way Comes (1972) - Director
- The Custard Boys (1979) - Director/Screenplay
- Captain Stirrick (1982) - Director
- A Swarm in May (1983) - Director/Writer
- Dark Enemy (1984) - Director/Writer
- School for Vandals (1986) - Director/Writer/Editor
- Hard Road (1988) - Director
- Under the Bed (1988) - Director
- Doombeach (1989) - Director/Writer/Editor
- Survivors (1990) - Director
- How's Business (1991) - Director/Writer
- Emily's Ghost (1992) - Director/Writer
- The Higher Mortals (1993) - Director
- Willie's War (1994) - Director/Writer
- Nightshade (1995) - Director
- The Gingerbread House (1997) - Director
- Awayday (1997) (short) - Director
