= Peter Bayliss =

English actor (1922–2002)

Peter Bayliss (27 June 1922 – 29 July 2002) was an English actor. Bayliss was born in Kingston upon Thames and trained at the Italia Conti Academy and the John Gielgud Company. More than six feet tall, with a voice to match, he supplemented it with a barrage of wheezings, croakings, mutterings and, as the opera singer in Frontiers of Farce (Old Vic, 1977), garglings. In 1956 he appeared on stage in "The Matchmaker" at the Royale Theatre in New York and in 1960 he appeared in "Ross" at the Royal Haymarket Theatre in London. His 20 films ranged from The Red Shoes (1948) to Darling (1965). He acted in more than 40 television productions including Please Sir! (he played the part of Mr Dunstable, Dennis Dunstable's father), The Sweeney, Coronation Street, Lovejoy and The Bill, plus dramas like Bye, Bye Columbus (1990), Merlin (1998) and The Arabian Nights (1999). On radio he was particularly good in Jacobean adaptations, playing characters with names such as Sir Moth-Interest and Walter Whorehound. He appeared in more than 100 theatre productions. He made several films for the Children's Film Unit in his later years. He died in 2002 at the age of 80.

== Selected filmography ==
- 1945 Caesar and Cleopatra as Aide to Mithridates (uncredited)
- 1948 The Red Shoes as Evans, Lord Oldham's Chauffuer (uncredited)
- 1952 The Frightened Man as Bilton
- 1959 Jet Storm as Bentley
- 1963 From Russia with Love as Commissar Benz
- 1965 Darling as Lord Grant
- 1966 The Spy with a Cold Nose as Professor (uncredited)
- 1967 Pretty Polly as Critch
- 1968 30 Is a Dangerous Age, Cynthia as Victor
- 1968 House of Cards as Edmond Rosier
- 1969 Lock Up Your Daughters as Mr. Justice Squeezum
- 1969 Arthur? Arthur! as Dr. Hubble
- 1969 The Magic Christian as Pompous Toff
- 1971 Please Sir! as Mr. Dunstable
- 1974 Vampira as Maltravers
- 1979 Mr. Selkie as Mr. Selkie
- 1983 Bullshot as Chairman of The Institute
- 1984 Mister Skeeter as Mr. Skeeter
- 1986 School for Vandals as Sir Oswald Kane
- 1988 Hard Road as Hitch-Hiker
- 1992 Emily's Ghost as Reverend Dodsworth
- 1994 Don't Get Me Started as Father (voice, uncredited)
- 1997 The Ugly Duckling as The Actor Manager (voice)
- 1998 Merlin as 2nd Physician
- 1999 Alice in Wonderland as Mr. Dodo
- 1999 Midsomer Murders as Tramp
- 2000 Arabian Nights as 1st Physician
