= Radio Rovers =

Radio station of Blackburn Rovers FC

Coordinates: 53.727665°N 2.488655°W

- Blackburn; England
- Frequency: 1404 kHz

History
- First air date: 1993
- Last air date: 2017
- Former frequencies: 1413 kHz

Radio Rovers was the official radio station of the English Championship football side Blackburn Rovers FC. It was launched at Ewood Park on 30 October 1993 (originally on 1413 kHz) and was the first dedicated football club radio station in the United Kingdom. Radio Rovers broadcast for the last time in May 2017, the last home game of that year's football season.

The studio was located in the 'Darwen End' stand at Ewood Park, with the station only operating on Blackburn home match days. The station broadcast on 1404 kHz AM from a small mast at the rear of the Darwen End car park, with coverage generally limited to Blackburn itself.

The broadcast included pre-match build up, music, team news, and manager comments before the match, full commentary during the match and post-match analysis, interviews, and viewer phone-ins after. The channel would begin broadcasting 4 hours prior to kick off, with a typical day totalling 7 hours on air.

The station broadcast a 'free to air' service under an OFCOM RSL (restricted service licence) on 1404 kHz am around Blackburn. It was also available online, and inside the stadium for visually-impaired supporters.

Gerald Jackson, recognised as the voice of Radio Rovers, was a long-standing presenter, also known for his regular broadcasting on the local BBC station, Radio Lancashire. Matthew Sillitoe replaced Gerald Jackson as presenter at the start of the 2014–15 season.
