= Clemency Burton-Hill =

English classical music broadcaster

Clemency Burton-Hill MBE
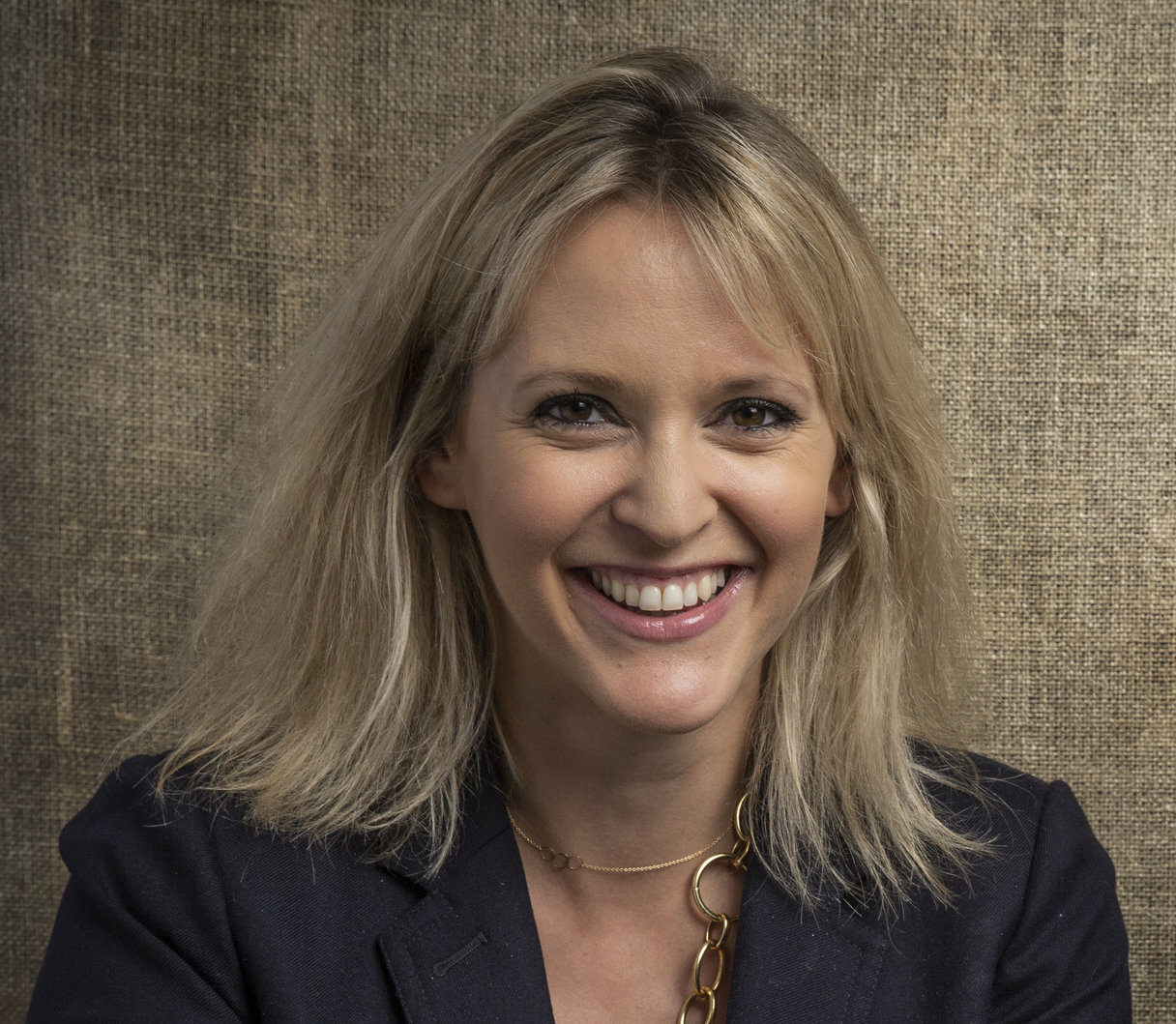
- Burton-Hill at the Hay Festival, Wales, 2018
- Born: Clemency Margaret Greatrex Burton-Hill; 17 March 1981 (age 45); Hammersmith, London, England
- Education: Magdalene College, Cambridge
- Occupations: Broadcaster, author, novelist, journalist, violinist and former actress
- Years active: 1992–present
- Employer: BBC
- Spouse: James Roscoe (m. 2008)
- Children: 2
- Father: Humphrey Burton

Clemency Margaret Greatrex Burton-Hill (born 17 March 1981) is an English broadcaster, author, novelist, journalist, and violinist. In her early career she also worked as an actress. In January 2020, she suffered a brain haemorrhage caused by a cerebral arteriovenous malformation and underwent emergency surgery in New York City. She continues to work on her recovery.

== Early life and career ==
Burton-Hill was born in Hammersmith, London, the daughter of Humphrey Burton, the BBC's first head of music and arts, and Gillian Hawser, an agent, who had previously married Robert Hill. The couple did not marry and Burton-Hill grew up, near central London, with her mother, alongside two older half-brothers. She got to know her father only in her twenties, although they became close.

She held scholarships at St Paul's Girls' School and Westminster School before studying English at Magdalene College, Cambridge, where she took a double first. Burton-Hill is also a former scholar at the Royal College of Music, where she was the recipient of the Hugh Bean Violin Prize, and a recipient of a Kennedy Scholarship to Harvard.

== Broadcasting ==
Burton-Hill began her broadcasting career in 2008 as a member of the live television presenting team at the Proms for BBC Four and BBC Two. She continued to present at the Proms, interviewing major artists including Philip Glass, Joshua Bell, Marin Alsop, Quincy Jones and Daniel Barenboim. Since 2015, she has presented coverage of the Last Night of The Proms. She was the television host of the BBC's biannual competition BBC Young Musician from 2010 to 2018.

In 2009, Burton-Hill began presenting BBC Radio 3's classical music weekend breakfast programme. In December 2013, she replaced Sara Mohr-Pietsch as the co-presenter of Radio 3's weekday Breakfast programme. She has also presented a wide range of other programmes for the network, including live concerts, a weekly broadcast from Wigmore Hall, and the New Generation Artists strand, which supports emerging international artists early in their career.

She has also written and presented a number of critically acclaimed music documentaries on BBC television including Stradivarius and Me, about the violin maker Antonio Stradivari, and Who’s Yehudi, which celebrated the centenary of Yehudi Menuhin, with whom she also took violin lessons as a teenager.

Between 2009 and the show ending in 2015, she was the performing arts reporter for The Culture Show on BBC Two television, presenting more than 30 films about classical music, opera, jazz, theatre and books.

Since 2015, Burton-Hill has been hosting the Royal Opera House’s cinema relays, broadcasting live to over 1,000 cinemas around the globe, and she is a regular host of their 'Insights' education programme, broadcasting to a live audience and on YouTube.

In May 2018, she took on the newly created role of Creative Director, Music and Arts, at WQXR-FM in New York, the leading classical radio station in the United States.

In July 2018, Burton-Hill began hosting a weekly podcast for BBC Radio 3 called 'Classical Fix' in which she introduces music fans to a variety of classical music and gets their feedback.

== Other activities ==
=== Journalism and writing ===
Burton-Hill's first job in journalism was as a staff writer at Vogue and she has since written for many major UK publications, including The Economist, The FT Weekend, The Guardian, The Observer, The Independent, The Sunday Times, The Sunday Telegraph, The Times Literary Supplement, Elle, and The Mail on Sunday. Her subjects range from the arts to artificial intelligence. She has been the music columnist for BBC Culture since 2013 and is BBC Music Magazine's chief interviewer. She was previously the UK's youngest broadsheet columnist, at The Daily Telegraph; a contributing editor for The Spectator; and a columnist at Total Politics and The Liberal magazines.

In January 2009, Burton-Hill's first novel, The Other Side of the Stars, was published by Headline Review, a division of Hodder Headline. She then signed a new two-book deal with Headline, and All The Things You Are was published in October 2013.

In October 2017, her first non-fiction book, Year of Wonder: Classical Music for Every Day was published, by Headline Home, also a division of Hodder Headline. The book has since been sold around the world, and the United States edition was published in November 2018 by Harper Wave, a division of HarperCollins. She also recorded the audiobook version.

In December 2021, her second non-fiction book, Another Year of Wonder: Classical Music for Every Day was published with a foreword by Elizabeth Day. The audio book has been recorded by Eddie Redmayne.

=== Live events ===
Burton-Hill is a frequent host of live events, panels and debates for organisations such as the Hay Festival and Intelligence Squared, regularly appearing at major arts venues including the Barbican Centre, Cadogan Hall, Wigmore Hall, the National Portrait Gallery, the Victoria and Albert Museum, the Saatchi Gallery, the National Theatre and Old Vic Theatre.

=== Music ===
Burton-Hill began playing the violin in childhood, studying with Helen Brunner and Rodney Friend. She has performed as a soloist, chamber musician and orchestral violinist, in some of the world's leading concert halls, including La Scala, Milan, the Musikverein, Vienna, London's Barbican Hall and Boston Symphony Hall. She has toured with Daniel Barenboim and the West-Eastern Divan Orchestra, as an honorary violinist.

=== Acting ===
Between 1992 and 2012, Burton-Hill worked as an actress in film and television productions, appearing in The Higher Mortals (1993), Dream Team (1997–98), The Last of the Blonde Bombshells (2000), Midsomer Murders (2004), Supernova (2005), Hustle (2006), and playing the regular role of Sophie Montgomery in Party Animals (2007), in which her cast-mates included Matt Smith, Andrea Riseborough and Andrew Buchan.

=== Other ===
On the 2015 Children In Need special edition of the BBC show Only Connect, she appeared alongside David Baddiel and Philip Hensher in the "Music Monkeys" team playing against team "Chess Pieces" made up of Bonnie Greer, Hugh Dennis and A.N. Wilson. She appeared on Pointless Celebrities in December 2013.

On September 29, 2022, she participated in a conversation and concert exploring music's role in brain injury recovery titled Healing with Music, with neurosurgeon Christopher Kellner, writer Maria Popova and violinist Alexi Kenney, in the Richardson Auditorium at the Alexander Hall, Princeton University.

== Personal life ==
Burton-Hill married James Roscoe, a British diplomat, in 2008. The couple moved to New York in 2009 where Roscoe was posted to the UK Mission to the United Nations in New York and returned to London in 2013. Following a further period in NY from 2018 to 2022, the family moved to Washington DC in August 2022. The couple have two sons.

Burton-Hill is a trustee of the children's education charity Dramatic Need.

On 20 January 2020, she collapsed in New York City after suffering a brain haemorrhage and underwent emergency surgery. Doctors removed half of her skull at Mount Sinai West hospital in Manhattan, and she was unconscious for 17 days; it was uncertain how much of her brain would recover. She has recovered with the help of music-based occupational therapy. On 20 January 2021 the first interview with Burton-Hill, who was learning to speak again, was broadcast on BBC Radio 4's Woman's Hour. She interviewed Elizabeth Day for her Classical Fix podcast in August 2021. In March 2025 the BBC broadcast My Brain: After the Rupture, a television documentary about her recovery from the brain haemorrhage.

Burton-Hill was appointed Member of the Order of the British Empire (MBE) in the 2022 Birthday Honours for services to broadcasting and journalism in the United States of America and the United Kingdom.

== Filmography ==
Year	Film	Role	Notes
1992	Emily's Ghost	Kelly	Children's Film Foundation
1993	The Higher Mortals	Melissa	
1997	Dream Team	Georgina Jacobs	
1997	The Promise	Elizabeth Gage	
2000	The Last of the Blonde Bombshells	Young Vera	
2000	Hit List	Nicky	
2002	Until Death	Emma Oldfield	
2005	Midsomer Murders	Hettie Trent	
2005	La Femme Musketeer	Marie Mancini	
2005	Supernova (TV movie)	Ginny McKillip	
2005	Dungeons & Dragons: Wrath of the Dragon God	Melora	
2005	A Higher Agency	Anna	
2006	Party Animals	Sophie Montgomery	
2006	Hustle	Melissa DeMonfort	Series 3, 'Ties That Bind Us'
2006	The Prince and Me 2: The Royal Wedding	Princess Kirsten	direct-to-video
2007	The Palace	Alice Templeton	
2007	Shoot on Sight	Pamela Davies	
2007	The Wreck	Isabelle	
2008	Agatha Christie: Poirot (Third Girl)	Claudia Reece-Holland	1 episode
2008	Kis Vuk/ A Fox's Tale	Arabella	voice
2009	Shadows in the Sun	Isabelle	
2009	Elegy	Mother	15min, Dir: Steven Bakewell
2009	Vivaldi, the Red Priest	Laura Padovan	
2010	Dark Relic	Rebecca	
2012	St George's Day	Amelia	
2012	Candle to Water	Elle	
2023	My Brain: After the Rupture	Herself	1hr 25min
