= Bob Broadbent =

English cricketer (1924–1993)

Personal information
- Full name: Robert Gillespie Broadbent
- Born: 21 June 1924; Beckenham, Kent, England
- Died: 26 April 1993 (aged 68); Bromyard, Herefordshire, England
- Batting: Right-handed
- Bowling: Right arm fast-medium

Domestic team information
- Years: Team
- 1950–1963: Worcestershire
- 1964: Hertfordshire

Career statistics
Competition	FC	LA
Matches	307	5
Runs scored	12,800	66
Batting average	27.58	16.50
100s/50s	13/70	0/1
Top score	155	51
Balls bowled	576	0
Wickets	4	–
Bowling average	95.50	–
5 wickets in innings	0	–
10 wickets in match	0	N/A
Best bowling	1–16	–
Catches/stumpings	297/0	2/0
- Source: CricketArchive, 11 October 2008

Robert Gillespie Broadbent (21 June 1924 – 26 April 1993) was an English first-class cricketer who played for Worcestershire between 1950 and 1963. He was capped by the county in 1951, and ten years later received a benefit season which raised £5,481. He was a fine close fielder, holding nearly 300 catches in his career.

== Life and career ==
Broadbent was educated at Caterham School, then became a navigator in the Royal Air Force. By 1949 he was appearing for Middlesex's Second XI; he scored 82 for them against Glamorgan II in July of that year.

He made his first-class debut for Worcestershire against Leicestershire at Grace Road in 1950; in a 177-run Worcestershire win Broadbent scored 77 and 29 not out. Nevertheless, it proved to be his only first-class appearance of the summer.

Broadbent became much more of a regular in the Worcestershire side in 1951 and enjoyed a fine season, which saw him capped by the county. He finished the year with 1,370 first-class runs at an average of over 39, by some margin his highest average in any season. In the course of this summer he hit what was to remain his highest score, a second-innings 155 against Middlesex in late June. Worcestershire had been in some trouble at 92/4, but Broadbent and captain Ronald Bird put on 132 for the fifth wicket and in the end the county ran out comfortable ten-wicket victors.

In 1952 Broadbent hit 1,556 first-class runs, his highest season's aggregate, and he was to pass a thousand in five further seasons, the last of these being 1961. (He had a near miss in 1962, with 968 runs.) His Wisden obituary records that, although he was often forced to play a stubbornly solid role on account of Worcestershire's frequent difficulties, when the Australians visited in 1953 he hit Keith Miller out of the New Road ground. In 1955, against Sussex at Hove, he hit two sixes off successive balls from Robin Marlar; both balls went right out of the ground and were lost.

Broadbent remained a regular in the side until the early 1960s, and stayed with the county just long enough to take part in some of the first one-day games, contributing an important 51, as part of a vital stand of 116 with Tom Graveney (93), to Worcestershire's Gillette Cup quarter-final victory over Glamorgan in June 1963. He also played in the final, which Worcestershire lost narrowly, but failed in making only 13.

Broadbent played no more first-class cricket after 1963, but he did turn out a few times in minor counties matches for Hertfordshire, making one List A appearance when Hertfordshire travelled to Durham in the first round of the 1964 Gillette Cup. It was a chastening experience: Broadbent himself scored 2, and Extras (13) was the highest score as Hertfordshire were bowled out for 63, losing by seven wickets.

Outside of cricket, Broadbent was also an accomplished hockey player, representing Worcestershire at county level.
