= The Higher Mortals =

- Directed by: Colin Finbow
- Produced by: Brianne Perkins
- Starring: Peter Morton; Fergus Brazier; Kaleb Gumbs; Glen Mead; Zoey Brand
- Cinematography: Sam McCourt
- Music by: David Hewson
- Production company: Children's Film Unit
- Distributed by: Watchmaker Films; Channel Four Films
- Release date: 1993
- Running time: 66 minutes
- Country: United Kingdom

The Higher Mortals is a film produced by the Children's Film Unit in 1993, directed by Colin Finbow and distributed by Channel Four Films. It was filmed in south Suffolk and north Essex, and received its sole TV transmission on Channel 4 on 25 September 1994, also being shown at the 1994 Edinburgh International Film Festival. It deals with the problems suffered by many smaller girls' boarding schools during the early 1990s recession, and makes use of metaphor and analogy in its critique of the John Major government of the day. It notably features early appearances by the now prominent actresses Jemima Rooper and Clemency Burton-Hill.

== Plot synopsis ==
Crabbe College is a lesser-known girls' boarding school (described at one point as "a little family school founded in the 1950s by a woman who was potty about poetry") which (like a considerable number of real schools of that ilk at the time, many of which closed) is suffering serious financial problems following the recession. The headmistress, Miss Thorogood (played by Susannah York) announces that some girls "and some boys" from deprived inner city areas will be coming to the school, as part of a plan by the government to help struggling private schools while simultaneously giving it justification for its cutbacks of social services in deprived areas. "The Higher Mortals", while also alluding to the general assumed social position of those already at the school, specifically refers to a secret society founded by some of the girls, based around social elitism and a particular veneration of literature.

The inner-city children - four boys, Jason, Wayne, Clint, and Ryan, and one girl, Hayley (whose mother had committed suicide) arrive at the school and are, for the most part, viewed with hostility and a general lack of understanding. It is implied that the boys are at the school due to an error in social services, with Miss Thorogood commenting that she is not even sure they have the same inner-city children they were intended to have. There is some hostility towards one of the boys, Ryan, on the grounds that he is black, with one teacher (the reactionary Mr Bowles, played by Richard Kane) describing him as a "black bastard", after he deliberately smashes a window during a detention he is serving for stealing the aforementioned teacher's car. There is an incident of joyriding, and it is revealed that at least one of the boys cannot read. A mood of uncertainty seems to run through the school as the summer term goes on, and it is made clear that the school's financial situation is more serious than it is willing to make public.

One of the inner-city children, Clint (played by Glen Mead) seems to blend into the school environment (he is seen reading right-wing newspapers such as The Sun, The Times and the Daily Mail) and is little heard from in the film's later stages. However, the other inner-city children develop a plot to burn the school down, which they trick some of the girls into participating in. On the day that education secretary Mrs Fry (who somewhat resembles the then government minister Virginia Bottomley) arrives to speak at the school's Speech Day, she is kidnapped by the inner-city children and tells them, incorrectly, that she will announce that the scheme of sending inner-city children to Crabbe College was a pointless waste of time and that the school was outmoded anyway.

At Speech Day, Mrs Fry actually says that it had been a great success, had secured the school's future and had justified the government's cutbacks in public funding. At this point, the plot to burn the school down (using petrol among other things) is put into action. In a powerful sequence, the headmistress is seen talking about "this still undeniably great country" as part of the school is already in flames.

Jason and Wayne are both killed in their getaway car after Jason, well versed in chemistry, hands his brother a cigarette to light while Wayne's hands are still covered in petrol. The film ends with Vicky saying that Crabbe College had been so badly damaged that it was closed down, with its pupils going to other schools. She herself had transferred to the comprehensive school that Hayley had come from, and she concludes by commenting that "I learnt that prize day that there could be no poetry for Jason and Wayne, and that ideals such as ours in the Higher Mortals had almost been abandoned. My education had begun."
