= Sarita Khajuria =

British actress (1974–2003)

- Khajuria, in the film Bhaji on the Beach (1993)
- Born: 1974
- Died: 19 March 2003 (aged 28–29); Albert Bridge, London, U.K.
- Education: Master's degree in International Journalism
- Occupation: Film actress

Sarita Khajuria (1974 – March 19, 2003) was a British actress of Indian and Finnish descent.

== Personal life ==
Khajuria was born to an Indian father from Jammu and a Finnish mother. She studied at the North London Collegiate School and gained 5 A grade A-levels. She then went to University and gained a master's degree in International Journalism.

== Career ==
Sarita made her acting debut in an episode of the channel 4 sitcom Tandoori Nights in 1987. She made her only major film appearance in the 1993 film Bhaji on the Beach which was directed by Gurinder Chadha. She played Hashida, a young but independent woman and one of the major characters in the film. She decides to remain pregnant, while on a trip to Blackpool, and seems to work out the relationship with her boyfriend. She also played an uncredited extra in Gurinder Chadha's 2002 hit film Bend It Like Beckham. Apart from these two film appearances she did not act in any other film. In 1998, she presented the Channel 4 children's news program First Edition.

== Death ==
In March 2003, she was found dead in the River Thames near Albert Bridge. The cause of death remains unknown, and police at the time expressed that the family was unhappy with the investigation. Her family expressed doubt that she committed suicide and speculated that she may have accidentally fallen into the river or was pushed. The official verdict on her death has been left open to speculation but there has been no proof to date that her death was murder, suicide or accidental drowning.

The last time she was seen was boarding a train from Paris to London Waterloo. Her body was found with her backpack but her passport and suitcase were missing. Family and friends remember her as a "talented and lovely young woman."
