= 1993 Newbury by-election =

- 6 May 1993

Newbury constituency
- Turnout: 71.3%
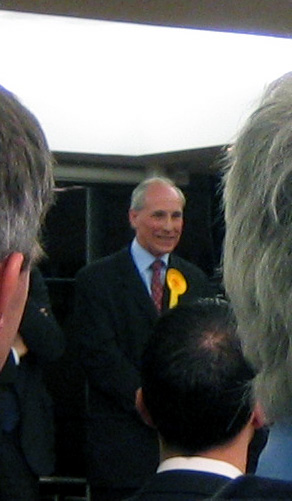
		Con
Candidate	David Rendel	Julian Davidson
Party	Liberal Democrats	Conservative
Popular vote	37,590	15,535
Percentage	65.1%	26.9%
Swing	▲27.8%	▼29.0%
MP before election
Judith Chaplin
Conservative
Elected MP
David Rendel
Liberal Democrats

The 1993 Newbury by-election was triggered by the death of the Member of Parliament (MP) for Newbury, the Conservative Judith Chaplin. The by-election was held on 6 May 1993, and was won by David Rendel of the Liberal Democrats with a large swing of 28.4%, and well over twice as many votes as the Conservative candidate. As with the overwhelming majority of UK by-elections, turnout was lower than at the general election, falling from 83% to 71%.

== Background ==
The by-election in Newbury was the first by-election of the 1992–1997 parliament, and the first in a string of by-election losses for the Conservative Party who were in their fourth consecutive term of office. Until 1993 the seat had been held by a Conservative MP since 1924.

== Candidates ==
Many independent candidates, or candidates from newly formed or minor parties stood in the by-election, with three candidates standing on an anti-Maastricht Treaty platform. Andrew Bannon, a Labour member from Slough stood as a Conservative Candidate in protest at a Conservative member standing as a Labour Candidate in the 1992 general election in Slough.

All candidates needed since 1985 to win at least 5% of the total votes to retain their deposit, which they must pay to stand for election. Every candidate apart from David Rendel and Julian Davidson lost their deposit, including Labour's Steve Billcliffe.

The by-election achieved a record of 19 candidates, beating the previous high of seventeen at the 1984 Chesterfield by-election. It remained the longest ballot paper in any Parliamentary election until the 2008 Haltemprice and Howden by-election.

== Result ==
Newbury by-election, 1993
Party	Candidate	Votes	%	±%
Liberal Democrats	David Rendel	37,590	65.1	+27.8
Conservative	Julian Davidson	15,535	26.9	−29.0
Labour	Steve Billcliffe	1,151	2.0	−4.0
Anti-Federalist League	Alan Sked	601	1.0	N/A
Conservative Candidate	Andrew Bannon	561	1.0	N/A
Commoners' Party	Stephen Martin	435	0.8	N/A
Monster Raving Loony	Lord David Sutch	432	0.7	N/A
Green	Jim Wallis	341	0.6	−0.2
Referendum Party	Robin Marlar	338	0.6	N/A
Conservative Rebel	John Browne	267	0.5	N/A
Corrective Party	Lindi St Clair	170	0.3	N/A
Maastricht Referendum for Britain	Bill Board	84	0.1	N/A
Natural Law	Michael Grenville	60	0.1	N/A
People & Pensioners Party	Johnathon Day	49	0.1	N/A
21st Century Independent Foresters	Colin Palmer	40	0.1	N/A
Defence of Children's Humanity Bosnia	Mladen Grbin	33	0.1	N/A
SDP	Alan Page	33	0.1	N/A
Communist (PCC)	Anne Murphy	32	0.1	N/A
Give the royal billions to schools	Michael Stone	21	0.1	N/A
Majority		22,055	38.2	N/A
Turnout		57,399	71.3	−11.5
Liberal Democrats gain from Conservative		Swing	+28.4	

Rendel served as MP until the 2005 general election, when he was defeated by the Conservative candidate Richard Benyon.

== General election result, 1992 ==
This is the result of the 1992 general election in Newbury.

UK General Election: Newbury, 1992
Party	Candidate	Votes	%	±%
Conservative	Judith Chaplin	37,135	55.9	−4.24
Liberal Democrats	David Rendel	24,778	37.3	+5.57
Labour	Richard J E Hall	3,962	6.0	−2.13
Green	Jim Wallis	539	0.8	+0.8
Majority		12,357	18.61	−9.8
Turnout		66,414	82.76	+4.8
Conservative hold		Swing		

== Aftermath ==
The loss of Newbury marked the beginning of a disastrous run of by-election defeats for John Major's Conservatives, as they went on to lose a further seven contests in seats they had held prior to the next general election in 1997. The result was later described by The Herald as "a major embarrassment for the Major Government", while Tim Farron would remember it as being "inspirational" for the Liberal Democrats.

As of 2024, the 37,590 votes received by Rendel is the highest number of votes received by an individual candidate for the Liberal Democrats in a Westminster election.

== See also ==
- Lists of United Kingdom by-elections
