= Judith Chaplin =

British politician (1939–1993)

Judith Chaplin OBE

Member of Parliament for Newbury
- In office 9 April 1992 – 19 February 1993
- Preceded by: Michael McNair-Wilson
- Succeeded by: David Rendel

Political Secretary to the Prime Minister of the United Kingdom
- In office 1990–1992
- Prime Minister: John Major
- Preceded by: John Whittingdale
- Succeeded by: Jonathan Hill

Personal details
- Born: Sybil Judith Schofield; 19 August 1939 Harpenden, Hertfordshire, England
- Died: 19 February 1993 (aged 53) Paddington, London, England
- Party: Conservative
- Spouses: Robert Walpole, 10th Baron Walpole (m. 1962; div. 1979) Michael Chaplin (m. 1984)
- Children: 4, including Alice
- Education: Wycombe Abbey
- Alma mater: Girton College, Cambridge; University of East Anglia

Sybil Judith Chaplin OBE, known as Judith Chaplin (née Schofield; 19 August 1939 – 19 February 1993), was a British Conservative Party politician.

== Career ==
Chaplin was elected a councillor on Norfolk County Council in 1975, following her husband into the role; on the council she became chairman of the education committee. She took on a role in 1986 with the Institute of Directors, becoming head of policy for the group. In 1988 she became special advisor to Nigel Lawson, the then Chancellor of the Exchequer, and remained in the role when John Major took over the following year. When Major became Prime Minister, she acted as his Private Secretary and political assistant.

She was elected to Parliament for Newbury at the 1992 election. That June she was appointed OBE, and she was considered likely to become chancellor of the exchequer herself in the future; however, these hopes were ended less than a year later by her sudden death.

== Personal life ==
Sybil Judith Schofield was born in Harpenden, Hertfordshire, on 19 August 1939. Her father, Theodore Thomas Schofield, was a dentist; her mother was Sybil Elsie, née Saunders. She was educated at Wycombe Abbey before studying economics at Girton College, Cambridge. She went on to gain a postgraduate degree in economics from the University of East Anglia.

She married Robert Walpole, 10th Baron Walpole, in 1962. They had two sons and two daughters, including Alice Walpole, British Ambassador to Luxembourg. However, their marriage was ultimately dissolved in 1979, and she married Michael Chaplin in 1984.

Judith Chaplin died of a pulmonary embolism on 19 February 1993.

== See also ==
- List of United Kingdom MPs with the shortest service
- 1993 Newbury by-election

Parliament of the United Kingdom
Preceded by Michael McNair-Wilson	Member of Parliament for Newbury; 1992–1993	Succeeded by David Rendel
Government offices
Preceded by John Whittingdale	Political Secretary to the Prime Minister; 1990–1992	Succeeded by Jonathan Hill
