= Children's Film Unit =

British film production project

The Children's Film Unit
- Production company logo
- Type: Limited Company
- Industry: Film, television
- Founded: 1981
- Founder: Colin Finbow
- Defunct: 2011
- Headquarters: London, England
- Key people: Colin Finbow (Artistic director); Brianne Perkins (Film producer)
- Products: Motion pictures
- Services: Film production

The Children's Film Unit was a unique British film production unit which offered children from the ages of 10 to 16 the opportunity to learn about all aspects of filmmaking, and to participate as part of the crew in the making of professional-quality feature films. The children were directly involved from the initial concept of a film right through to the completed product.

CFU films had a theatrical release, as well as being shown on British and overseas television, and were exhibited (and sometimes winners) at international film festivals.

The CFU was a registered educational charity. Official patrons included Lord Attenborough, Steven Spielberg, Susannah York, Lord Puttnam, and Sir John Mortimer CBE, QC. The President of the CFU was Prince Edward.

== Origins ==
Colin Finbow on location for "Doombeach" (1989) Photograph by Kit Ellis

The Children's Film Unit was formed in 1981 by schoolteacher and ex-Avengers writer, Colin Finbow. It had begun life as the film studies department at Forest Hill School in South East London. The standard of the work Finbow and his students produced so excited professional film makers due to its quality and freshness that, after one of their films, "The Custard Boys" (1979) received critical acclaim, it was suggested that more children should benefit from this unique experience.

== The 1980s and 1990s ==
The CFU operated outside of normal school hours, when during regular weekend and holiday workshops the children were trained to a high level of competence in all aspects of filmmaking, including camera-work, lighting, sound, acting, writing, and costume. Although some of the CFU's children did perform in their films, they only played the roles of children. All adult characters were performed by professional adult actors.

Generally the CFU produced one feature-length film per year, with the bulk of the production schedule occurring during the summer holidays. After principal photography was completed, pick-ups would be shot during weekends. Although all the films were then edited by director Colin Finbow, the children were given the opportunity to participate in the post-production process, within the limits of the post-production facilities and their own school schedules. Between features, the children's training consisted of making short films, and attending regular lectures and demonstrations from industry experts, such as Bryan Forbes, Lord Attenborough, Lord Puttnam and others.

The CFU's tiny premises at Studio 4, Berrytime Studios, Queenstown Road, Battersea, was organised with the children learning acting skills working upstairs in the area used for administration, tea-making, and toilets, while those studying the technical aspects of film-making worked downstairs in two small rooms filled with old props and a plethora of donated equipment, which included a Moviola, a Steenbeck, two Arriflex 16SR cameras, one Arriflex 16BL camera, a 16mm Bolex camera, a Nagra III, and assorted lights, legs, lenses, microphones, and booms. Grip equipment (dollys, cranes etc.) was usually hired-in as needed, along with much other additional hardware. But despite the cramped conditions, the children of the CFU still found space to build interior sets when required. The CFU later moved to Warner Bros. Studios, Leavesden, in Hertfordshire.

The CFU frequently employed the services of friends in the film and television industry, both in the creative fields, and also the areas of equipment hire, post-production facilities, and distribution/publicity, who regularly donated their time or equipment. One regular collaborator was composer, Dave Hewson, who composed the original music for most of the CFU's films. Ray and Tom Harris from special effects company Any Effects created the on-set effects for many of the films, and were among the industry professionals who gave lectures and demonstrations during weekend workshops.

During production of How's Business (1991), the CFU crew were followed by a BBC documentary crew for an episode of the popular children's series The Lowdown. This episode covered the filming of How's Business and featured several members of the CFU in interviews and voice-over. The documentary concluded with scenes of the Royal Premiere at Leicester Square, and merged its own credits with the credits from How's Business. This episode was first broadcast on BBC1 at 17:10 on 5 May 1992.

== Exhibition and Distribution ==
Several films by the Children's Film Unit received Royal Premieres, including:

Under The Bed at the Odeon Leicester Square, on Saturday 17 September 1988

Doombeach at BAFTA, Piccadilly, on Sunday 4 November 1990

How's Business at the Odeon West End, Leicester Square, on Sunday 15 March 1992.

Willie's War at The Prince Charles Cinema, WC2, on Thursday 4 May 1995

The Gingerbread House at BAFTA, Piccadilly, on Monday 3 March 1997

Almost all of their films have been shown on Channel 4, had a theatrical release, and been distributed in territories around the world. Channel 4 financed and televised most of the CFU's output, and Watchmaker Films handled worldwide distribution. However, How's Business was produced in collaboration with the Children's Film and Television Foundation (with which the CFU often was confused in popular media) and was never shown on TV in the UK, while the last three films in the filmography listed below were only ever shown in the small hours of the morning, as Channel 4 shifted its focus in the later 1990s.

== Festivals and awards ==
Daemon – Munich

Dark Enemy – London & Munich

Hard Road – Frankfurt, Chicago, Dulu, and Duisburg – Awarded Lucas Prize, Frankfurt

Mister Skeeter – Awarded Prix Danube, Bratislava

School For Vandals – London & Chicago

A Swarm in May – Moscow

Under The Bed – Chicago

Doombeach – Frankfurt, Sydney, Chicago, London

Emily's Ghost – Frankfurt, Belfast, Brighton, Edinburgh

Willie's War – First prize at the Youth Film Festival of Flanders

== Selected filmography ==
Captain Stirrick (1982) A musical based on the 1840 press account of a real case. Captain Stirrick leads a gang of child pickpockets in Victorian London, but their attempt to rob a Lord ends in murder and a trip to the gallows. Cast includes: Julian Silvester, Freddie Jones, Douglas Storm & Jason Kemp (previously credited as) Anthony Kemp

A Swarm in May (1983) Returning to the school where he is a chorister, after an unhappy Easter holiday, John Owen faces the daunting task of singing the Beekeeper's solo in an ancient ritual at Whitsuntide. After refusing his duty, he is helped by the Head Chorister and the organist to uncover the 400-year-old mystery behind the beekeeper's service, and to regain his self-esteem by laying a ghost to rest. Cast includes: Oliver Hicks, Jack May, Frank Middlemass, Douglas Storm

Mister Skeeter (1984) Lisa and Jamie are residents in a children's home, which is threatened with closure. They escape to the seaside, where they encounter Mr. Skeeter, an elderly eccentric who befriends them. Jamie is convinced that Skeeter is a millionaire in disguise and that all their troubles are over. But in fact they are just beginning. Cast includes: Peter Bayliss, Louise Rawlings, Orlando Wells

Dark Enemy (1984) Set in an idyllic valley, the story centres around a group of children surviving after the death of their elders. Three boys set out on a quest to determine who will be the tribe's next leader, and the discoveries of the youngest reveal the alarming truth behind their primitive existence. Cast includes: David Haig, Douglas Storm

Daemon (1985) Unhappy schoolboy, Nick Foster, is sent to a psychiatrist after developing sores and hearing strange voices. She is at hand when a series of terrifying supernatural events threaten to destroy him. Cast includes: Arnaud Morell, Susannah York, Bert Parnaby

School For Vandals (1986) Having taught for fifteen years in Inner London schools, Neil and Penny are delighted when a pools win enables them to buy a school in the country to develop as a healthy centre of private education. But its history as a reform school and their unruly children do not endear them to the locals. When funds threaten to run out, the children lend a hand... by kidnapping an old lady. Cast includes: Jenni Barrand, Jeremy Coster, Peter Bayliss, Sebastian Knapp

Under The Bed (1988) Adapted from a story by Bill Oddie and Laura Beaumont, this is the story of Felicity, whose habit of throwing things under her bed, including an uneaten bowl of cereal, moldy apples cores, family heirlooms, and even elderly relatives, leads to the birth of "Heap", a monster with an insatiable appetite. Cast includes: Nicola Stewart, Thomas Arnold, Tim Brooke-Taylor, Bill Oddie, Graeme Garden, Peter Corey, Maria Charles

Hard Road (1988) An accidental meeting between bored schoolgirl, Kelly, and suicidal schoolboy, Max, leads to the two children stealing a Ferrari and running away together in it. They briefly enjoy a love-hate relationship before the real world catches up with them. Cast includes: Francesca Camillo, Max Rennie, John Louis Mansi, Amanda Murray, Peter Bayliss, Jenni Barrand, Luke Jones

Infantile Disorders (1988) Cast includes: Mark Heatley, Gavin May

Doombeach (1989) When an administrative error causes 13-year-old Gavin to be sent to the wrong school, he begins truanting with a "gang" of younger kids. After his new friend Mark is hospitalised following a swimming race in the ocean, Gavin begins to suspect a nearby power station of leaking its waste into the sea. After organising a protest and gaining media attention, Gavin enlists the aid of a sympathetic teacher to help him break into the power station with a Geiger counter. Cast includes: Jeremy Coster, Glenda Jackson, Michael Sheard, Peter Marshall, Emma Freud

Survivors (1990) A group of teenage boys are tricked into accompanying their teacher on a survival holiday to a deserted island, but after he suffers a nervous breakdown and turns hostile, the boys are forced to fend for themselves. Cast includes: Ian Hogg, Susan Curnow, Michael Bond, Damian Hodges, David Issacs, Danny Joy, Russell Lyesight, Hayden Peters, Carlton Taylor, Ben Wheeler

How's Business (1991) Adapted from the book by Alison Prince, this wartime drama follows young Howard Grainger as he is evacuated from London during the Blitz and relocated to the countryside, where he begins a series of schemes to try and accrue sufficient funds to return home. Cast includes: Ben Brazier, Ron Moody, Paul Brightwell, Paul Copley, Sara Clee, Richard Digance, Don Henderson, Brett Fancy, Emily Richard, Ann Way, Carol MacReady

Emily's Ghost (1992) Edwardian drama about a girl who dreams of becoming a doctor, but is unable to pursue her ambitions due to the social constraints of the era. By supernatural means she encounters a girl from the 1990s who is also unhappy, and the two friends swap places. Cast includes: Anna Jones, Rosalind Ayres, Martin Jarvis, Toby Gregory, Anna Massey, Ron Moody, Patsy Byrne, Peter Bayliss, Lally Percy, Gordon Griffin

The Higher Mortals (1993) Crabbe College faces closure when parents start withdrawing their children (and fees) due to the recession. A possible solution is found in the shape of truants and young offenders who, it is hoped, will benefit from the rural surrounds and return to society the better for it. Cast includes: Jemima Rooper, Gordon Griffin, Susannah York, Patsy Byrne, Tat Whalley, John Altman, Paula Wilcox

Willie's War (1994) 10-year-old Willie is evacuated from East London to the posh country house of 13-year-old Zander, where he is forced to endure Zander's snobbery and bullying. His only friends are Zandar's nanny and a young soldier named Blake. When Willie's father unexpectedly turns up in the woods having deserted the army, disaster strikes. Cast includes: Lee Turnbull, Jean Alexander, Philip Boddy, Gordon Griffin, Edward Highmore, Jemima Rooper, Tat Whalley

Nightshade (1995) A break in the country has sinister repercussions for the Brady Family. Cast includes: Emily Richard, Simon Ward, Jarrah Venables

The Gingerbread House (1996) Two children are left alone in the house of their dead grandfather. Cast includes: Danielle Hawley, Danny Barnham, Ian Johnstone, Gordon Griffin, Brian Sibley, Wendy Jones, Patsy Byrne

Awayday (1997) Cast includes: Daniel Cogan, David Comerford, Tom Golding, Shanie Hanley, Rachel Malin

== 21st century ==
The CFU continued to operate for the first decade of the new millennium, but lack of funding prevented them from making any further feature films. On 9 August 2011 the Children's Film Unit was removed from the register of UK charities.

== See also ==
- Children's Film Foundation
