= David Rendel =

British politician (1949–2016)

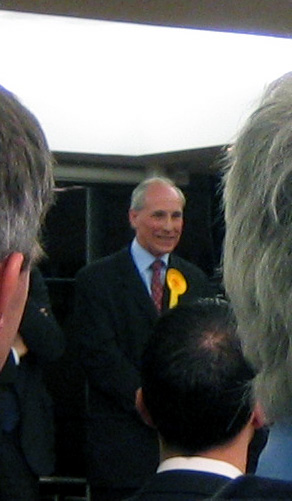
- David Rendel at the Newbury declaration for the 2005 election

Member of Parliament for Newbury
- In office 6 May 1993 – 11 April 2005
- Preceded by: Judith Chaplin
- Succeeded by: Richard Benyon

Personal details
- Born: 15 April 1949 Athens, Greece
- Died: 16 May 2016 (aged 67) Berkshire, England
- Party: Liberal Democrats
- Other political affiliations: Liberal
- Education: Magdalen College, Oxford, St Cross College, Oxford

David Digby Rendel (15 April 1949 – 16 May 2016) was a British politician for the Liberal Democrats. He was the Member of Parliament (MP) for Newbury from 1993 to 2005. He won the seat in a by-election in May 1993 triggered by the death of Judith Chaplin, and he held it until his defeat at the 2005 general election to Conservative candidate Richard Benyon. At the time he lost his seat he was the Liberal Democrats' spokesman on Higher and Further Education.

== Early life ==
Rendel was born in Athens. He was a King's Scholar at Eton College. in his gap year after Eton, he was a VSO volunteer teacher for 14 months in Cameroon and Uganda. He took a BSc in Physics and Philosophy from Magdalen College, Oxford, then entered St Cross College, Oxford. He was a member of the winning Oxford boat race crew of 1974. After Oxford, he worked as a finance and IT manager for Shell Oil Company, British Gas and Esso.

His father Sandy Rendel was a SOE agent and foreign correspondent for The Times, and he was a great-grandson of civil engineer Sir Alexander Meadows Rendel, and a great-great-nephew of Liberal MP Stuart Rendel.

== Political career ==
In 1979 and 1983 at Fulham, Rendel fought and lost two elections. In 1986, he moved to Newbury with his GP wife Sue. From 1987 to 1995, he was a Newbury District Councillor. In the 1992 general election, he contested the Newbury seat unsuccessfully, gaining 37% of the votes.

He won the 1993 Newbury by-election with a majority of 22,055, the largest Liberal or Liberal Democrat Westminster majority in history, receiving 65% of the votes. He first came to national attention for supporting the Newbury bypass, and in 1999 stood in the election for the leadership of the Liberal Democrats, but came fifth of five candidates, with Charles Kennedy being elected.

Rendel held on to his seat in 1997 and 2001 with reduced majorities, but at the 2005 election he was defeated by the Conservative candidate, Richard Benyon.

In May 2006, Rendel was selected by local party members as the Liberal Democrat candidate for the Newbury seat for the next election. At the general election in May 2010, he was again defeated by the sitting Conservative, Richard Benyon, whose majority grew to 21%.

Rendel was a directly elected member of the Liberal Democrats’ Federal Executive until 2014. After the election of 2010, Rendel was the only member on the Federal Executive to vote against the Conservative–Liberal Democrat coalition agreement.

In September 2014, Rendel was selected as Liberal Democrat candidate in the 2015 general election for the seat of Somerton and Frome in Somerset; however, he lost to the Conservative candidate, David Warburton.

== Death ==
Rendel died from cancer in Berkshire on 16 May 2016, aged 67.

== Legacy ==
Lee Dillon, describes Rendel as his political inspiration, complimenting his passion for the constituency. In 2024, Dillon won the Newbury constituency for the Liberal Democrats for the first time since Rendel's defeat in 2005.

Parliament of the United Kingdom
Preceded by Judith Chaplin	Member of Parliament for Newbury; 1993–2005	Succeeded by Richard Benyon
