= Bhaji on the Beach =

1993 film directed by Gurinder Chadha

- VHS cover
- Directed by: Gurinder Chadha
- Screenplay by: Meera Syal
- Story by: Meera Syal; Gurinder Chadha
- Produced by: Nadine Marsh-Edwards
- Starring: Kim Vithana; Jimmi Harkishin; Sarita Khajuria
- Cinematography: John Kenway
- Edited by: Oral Norrie Ottey
- Music by: John Altman; Craig Pruess
- Production companies: Channel Four Films; Umbi Films
- Distributed by: First Independent Films
- Release date: 11 September 1993 (Toronto Film Festival)
- Running time: 101 minutes
- Country: United Kingdom
- Languages: English; Hindi; Punjabi
- Box office: $735,192

Bhaji on the Beach is a 1993 British comedy-drama film directed by Gurinder Chadha (in her feature film directorial debut) and written by Meera Syal.

== Plot ==
A community group of British women (mostly Punjabis of various faiths) of different generations take a group day out to the Blackpool Illuminations. The tensions of the generation gap torn between tradition and modernism as well as the personal upsets and issues of the women and girls come to boiling point as they spend the day out.

Simi, the head of the group, has modern social beliefs about feminism that the older club women object to, however she manages to be the caring, in-control figure who holds the day together despite tensions. Ginder is escaping from her abusive criminal husband with her young son and fighting the stigma of being a single parent and her son's pleas to have both a mother and father again; unbeknownst to them is the fact that her husband and his brothers have tracked them to Blackpool. Two boy-crazy teenage girls meet with the disapproval of the conservative older ladies, and Simi after they meet up with a pair of American-themed burger bar employees after their shift ends. Hashida is a high flying student who is about to start medical school, yet would prefer to be studying painting. She has hidden her Afro-Caribbean boyfriend Oliver from her family for a year, but now she's pregnant by him and now they must decide about the child and their relationship, fearing that it would not stand the strain of social disapproval. Asha, a devout Hindu and Bollywood-cinema fan, is stuck with a humdrum life in her convenience shop and finds excitement and a sense of fulfilling missed opportunities in life with a charming, eccentric, artistic English actor in Blackpool, yet feels she must stay in her marriage; she experiences frequent Bollywood-themed hallucinations and day-dreams.

In the end, most of the characters have their stories left open. We do not see what happens to Asha or Oliver and Hashida and the final scenes of these characters seem quite content but open-ended. Ginder and her son escape the violence of her husband after one of his brothers rebels against him, having been pulled away from his own wife and derided for his loving marriage, and the most conservative characters receive a humorous treatment in a strip club.

== Cast ==
- Zohra Sehgal as Pushpa
- Shaheen Khan as Simi
- Kim Vithana as Ginder
- Jimmi Harkishin as Ranjit
- Sarita Khajuria as Hashida
- Mo Sesay as Oliver
- Rudolph Walker as Oliver's father
- Lalita Ahmed as Asha
- Amer Chadha-Patel as Amrik
- Nisha Nayar as Ladhu
- Renu Kochar as Madhu
- Surendra Kochur as Bina
- Souad Faress as Rekha
- Tanveer Ghani as Balbir
- Bharti Patel as Refuge Woman
- Dane Power as Man on Street

== Reception ==
In a review, Sight & Sound commented that Bhaji on the Beach "offered some trenchant observations about prevalent prejudices and what the younger, British-born generation of Asians had to offer. In Bhaji on the Beach, her feature film debut, Chadha has tried to adhere to this code of Buzurgh loyalty (the age span ranges from 6 to the late 60s), while trying to encompass the more awkward and raw elements thrown up by contemporary Asian women's lives." Rotten Tomatoes retrospectively collected reviews from 48 critics to give the film a score of 88%.

== Year-end lists ==
- Honorable mention – Kenneth Turan, Los Angeles Times
