= List of programmes broadcast by Sky Witness =

Below is a list of television shows broadcast on Sky Witness in the United Kingdom and Ireland. The list also includes shows broadcast on Sky Living before it was rebranded to Sky Witness in 2018. The channel's programming comprises a mix of shows acquired from the United States and syndicated factual programming. The channel was previously targeted at a female audience, but later shifted its programming to also include the male demographic.

== Current programming ==
=== Acquired programming ===
- Chicago Fire
- Chicago Med (series 5–present) (Note: Moved from Universal TV)
- Chicago P.D. (series 7–present) (Note: Moved from 5USA)
- CIA
- Doc
- Elsbeth
- FBI
- Fire Country
- Irish Blood
- Law & Order: Organized Crime
- Law & Order: Special Victims Unit (series 21–present)
- Matlock
- The Rookie

=== Syndicated repeats ===
- 999 Frontline
- A1: Britain's Longest Road
- Air Ambulance ER
- Bondi Rescue
- Border Patrol
- Border Security: America's Front Line
- Border Security: Canada's Front Line
- Border Security USA
- Brit Cops: Frontline Crime UK
- Brit Cops: Law and Disorder
- Brit Cops: Rapid Response
- Burn Notice
- Caught on Camera
- Caught on Dashcam
- Caught Red Handed
- Customs UK
- The Force: Manchester
- Highway Patrol
- Law & Order: Criminal Intent
- Motorway Patrol
- Nothing to Declare
- Nothing to Declare UK
- Police 24/7
- Road Wars
- Send In the Dogs
- Stop, Search, Seize
- Sun, Sea and A&E
- UK Border Force

== Former programming ==
- 9-1-1 (series 1–5) (Note: Moved to Disney+)
- 9-1-1 Lone Star (series 1–2)
- 21 Jump Street
- 227
- 6ixth Sense
- The A-Team
- Abbey & Janice: Beauty & The Beast
- Ace Crawford, Private Eye
- Adam-12
- The Adventures of Ozzie and Harriet
- The Adventures of Superman
- Agony Hour
- Alice
- The Amazing Race
- Amen
- America's Next Top Model
- Archie Bunker's Place
- Army Wives
- The Bachelor USA
- Bad Girls Club
- Barbary Coast
- Baretta
- Barney Miller
- Benson
- Best of the West
- The Betty White Show
- Bewitched
- The Beverly Hillbillies
- The Biggest Loser
- The Birth of the Spice Girls
- The Blacklist (series 1–4) (Note: Moved to Sky One)
- Blindspot
- Blood Ties
- Blow Out
- Blue Bloods (series 9–14) (Note: Moved from Sky Atlantic)
- The Bob Newhart Show
- Body of Evidence
- Bonanza
- Bones (series 7–12)
- Boston Legal
- Break with the Boss
- Brookside
- Britain's Next Top Model
- Bull (series 6) (Note: Moved from Fox)
- Burke's Law
- The Burns and Allen Show
- Cagney & Lacey
- Campus Ladies
- Canada's Next Top Model
- Cannon
- Car 54, Where Are You?
- Carol Burnett and Friends
- The Catch
- Catchword
- Celebrity Extra
- Charles in Charge
- Charmed
- Chasing Farrah
- The Children's Channel
- CHiPs
- Crossing Over with John Edward
- Chuck
- The Cleaning Lady (series 1–3) (Note: Moved to HBO Max)
- Close to Home
- Cold Case
- The Comeback
- Conviction
- Coroner (series 3–4)
- Cougar Town
- Criminal Minds (series 1–15)
- Crosswits
- CSI: Crime Scene Investigation
- CSI: Miami
- The Cut
- Da Vinci's Inquest
- Dallas
- Daniel Boone
- The Danny Thomas Show
- Dating in the Dark
- Dead Famous
- Dennis the Menace
- Departure (series 2–3)
- Derek Acorah's Ghost Towns
- Desi Rascals (series 1)
- The Detectives Starring Robert Taylor
- Dharma & Greg
- The Dick Van Dyke Show
- Diet on the Dancefloor
- A Different World
- Diff'rent Strokes
- Dirty Cows
- Dirty Dancing: The Time of Your Life
- Dog and Cat
- The Donna Reed Show
- Dracula
- Dragnet
- Dynasty
- The Ed Sullivan Show
- Eight Is Enough
- Elementary
- Emergency!
- The Enfield Haunting
- The Equalizer
- Exposed
- Extreme Makeover
- Extreme Makeover: Home Edition
- F Troop
- The Facts of Life
- Falcon Crest
- Fantasy Island
- Father Knows Best
- FBI: International
- FBI: Most Wanted
- Fernwood 2nite
- The Flip Wilson Show
- The Flying Nun
- For Life
- For The People
- Four Weddings
- Futurama
- Get Smart
- Ghost Whisperer
- Gidget
- Gilligan's Island
- Gomer Pyle, U.S.M.C.
- The Good Doctor
- Good Morning with Anne and Nick
- Grey's Anatomy (series 1–18)
- Growing Pains
- Hannibal
- The Hairdresser
- The Hardy Boys/Nancy Drew Mysteries
- Haunting Evidence
- Have Gun, Will Travel
- Hazel
- High School Reunion
- Hill Street Blues
- Home and Away
- How To Get Away With Murder (series 3–6)
- The Honeymooners
- Hot in Cleveland
- Hunter
- Infatuation UK
- Instinct
- I Pity the Fool
- I'm Famous and Frightened!
- Jade Changed My Life
- Jade's Salon
- Jade's P.A
- Jane Goldman Investigates
- The Janice Dickinson Modeling Agency
- The Jerry Springer Show
- Joan of Arcadia
- Joanie Loves Chachi
- Jokers Wild
- Julia
- Just Jade
- Just Shoot Me!
- Justice
- Kath & Kim
- Katie
- Kilroy
- Knight Rider
- Knots Landing
- Kojak
- Lassie
- Law & Order (series 1–20) (Note: Moved to 5USA)
- Law & Order True Crime
- Leave It to Beaver
- Lincoln Rhyme: Hunt for the Bone Collector
- Lingo
- Lipstick Jungle
- Lois and Clark: The New Adventures of Superman
- Loose Lips
- Lost in Space
- Love American Style
- The Love Boat
- Lucky Ladders
- The Lucy Show
- The L Word
- Madam Secretary
- Mama's Family
- Max & Ruby
- Mannix
- The Many Loves of Dobie Gillis
- Marcus Welby, M.D.
- Mary Hartman, Mary Hartman
- The Mary Tyler Moore Show
- Masterchef
- Maude
- Mayberry RFD
- McHale's Navy
- Medium
- Melrose Place
- Men in Trees
- Miss Match
- Mister Ed
- The Monkees
- Moonlight
- Mork & Mindy
- Most Haunted
- Most Haunted Live!
- Mount Pleasant
- Murphy Brown
- My First Time
- My Three Sons
- Nashville (series 4–6) (Note: Moved from More4)
- Nero Wolfe
- New Amsterdam (series 3–5) (Note: Moved from Amazon Prime Video)
- The New Mr and Mrs Show
- Newhart
- The Odd Couple
- Outback Jack
- Outrageous Home Videos
- Paranormal Egypt
- The Partridge Family
- Peak Practice
- Perfect Strangers
- Pete's PA
- Petticoat Junction
- Phyllis
- Police Woman
- Private Eyes (series 4–5)
- Private Practice
- The Psychic Detective
- Psychic Investigators
- Quantum Leap
- Queer Eye for the Straight Guy
- The Resident (series 3–4) (Note: Moved from Universal TV and moved to Disney+)
- RSPCA Animal Rescue
- The Rookie: Feds
- The Rat Patrol
- Ready, Steady, Cook
- reLIVINGtv
- Rescue 911
- Retail Therapy
- Rhoda
- Ricki Lake
- Ringer
- Room 222
- Roseanne
- Rowan & Martin's Laugh-In
- Sanford and Son
- Scandal
- SceneOne
- Scream Team
- Second City TV
- The Secret Circle
- Sensing Murder
- Sex Court
- Sexcetera
- Shades of Blue
- Shane
- Showbiz Moms and Dads
- Solve Your Murder!
- The Sonny & Cher Comedy Hour
- Sports Kids' Moms and Dads
- St. Elsewhere
- Stalker
- Starsky & Hutch
- Straight Dates by Gay Mates
- Supernatural (series 1–8) (Note: Moved to E4)
- Station 19 (series 1–5)
- Tabitha
- Talk About
- Teen Wolf
- The Mob Doctor
- Tempestt
- That Girl
- That's What I'm Talking About
- The Three Stooges
- Tiny Living
- To the Manor Bowen
- Too Close for Comfort
- Top Chef
- Tori & Dean: Inn Love
- Total Recall 2070
- Transplant (series 1–2)
- Trivial Pursuit
- Trolley Dollies
- Trouble
- The Truth About the Harry Quebert Affair
- Turnabout
- Twin Peaks (series 1–2) (Note: Moved to Sky Atlantic)
- The Underdog Show
- Unforgettable
- Veronica Mars
- Viva Laughlin
- The Waltons
- Watson
- Welcome Back Kotter
- What's Happening!!
- What's Happening Now!!
- When Chefs Attack
- Will & Grace
- WKRP in Cincinnati
- The X-Files (series 1–9) (Note: Moved to Channel 5)
