= Bobby Brazier =

English actor and model (born 2003)

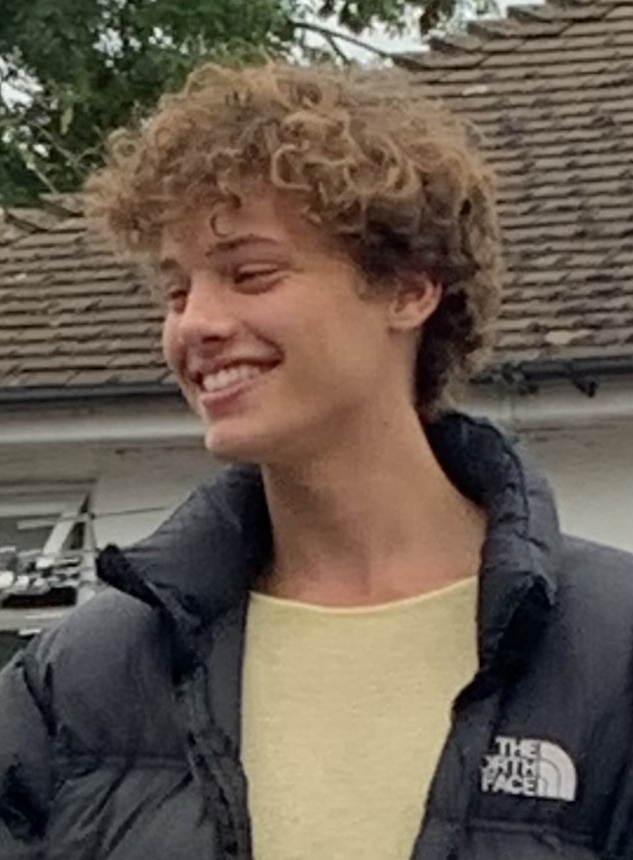
- Brazier in 2022
- Born: Bobby Jack Brazier; 2 June 2003 (age 23); London, England
- Occupations: Actor; model
- Years active: 2005–present
- Parents: Jeff Brazier (father); Jade Goody (mother)
- Modelling information
- Height: 6 ft 1.5–2 in
- Hair colour: Brown
- Eye colour: Green
- Agency: Unsigned Group

Bobby Jack Brazier (born 2 June 2003) is an English actor and model. Present in the public eye from birth due to the popularity of his mother, Jade Goody, he was frequently featured in the media throughout the formative years of his life until Goody's death in 2009.

At 16, Brazier began his modelling career and made his catwalk debut at Milan Fashion Week in 2020. He rose to prominence after joining the cast of the BBC One soap opera EastEnders as Freddie Slater in 2022. The role earned him a National Television Award. He was a contestant on the 21st series of the dancing competition show Strictly Come Dancing in 2023 and finished as a runner-up. Brazier subsequently won a National Film Award UK for his performance in the 2024 television series Curfew.

== Early life ==
Bobby Jack Brazier was born on 2 June 2003 at Portland Hospital in Westminster. He is the son of television personality Jade Goody and television presenter Jeff Brazier. His maternal grandfather was half Jamaican. Due to the popularity of his mother, Brazier was in the public eye from birth and appeared in the occasional episode of her Sky Living reality series from 2005 until her death from cervical cancer in 2009. After her death, he and his younger brother Freddy were kept out of the spotlight following the high media presence whilst Goody was alive and during the final months of her life. Due to high media attention, they did not attend her funeral. Brazier only made a single appearance in the 2010 documentary titled Jade: A Year Without Her.

Brazier grew up with his brother in Harlow, Essex, raised by their father with the help of his mother and later his future wife, Kate Dwyer. He attended a private school in London until year seven before moving with his family to Brighton where he was enrolled at a state school. At the state school, Brazier experienced bullying, and after a year, the family moved back to London, where he returned to the private school and completed his GCSE exams. While modelling, he worked at a milkshake café and was briefly a social media apprentice. He also played football.

== Career ==
=== Modelling ===
Brazier began his modelling career in 2019 at age 16 after he was scouted by Cesar Perin whilst walking down the street and signed to his modelling agency, Unsigned Group. In January 2020, he made his catwalk debut, modelling for Dolce & Gabbana at Milan Fashion Week. The same year, he modelled for Tommy Hilfiger at London Fashion Week and walked Paris Fashion Week. In 2021, he appeared in a fashion film for GCDS and featured in the pre-autumn campaign for Bianca Saunders and the autumn/winter campaign for Richard Quinn. He walked the spring/summer 2022 fashion show for Helen Anthony and the autumn/winter 2024 fashion show for Holzweiler. In February 2026, he returned to Milan Fashion Week to model for Gucci at Demna's debut show as the brand's creative director.

As a model, Brazier was featured in editorials for the magazines British GQ, Lewis, MMScene, Odda, Schön! and Tings, and covered the magazines 10 Men Magazine, Dust Magazine, Grazia UK and Man About Town.

=== EastEnders ===
In 2022, Brazier made his acting debut in the BBC One soap opera EastEnders, taking over the role of Freddie Slater, the son of established character Little Mo Mitchell (Kacey Ainsworth), after the character last appeared as a baby. The show's executive producer, Chris Clenshaw, who came across Brazier's profile on social media, said of his casting: "There was some of what I saw in Bobby that I thought would be perfect for Freddie. His energy, his twinkle, his spiritual side. So then we brought Bobby in to audition along with some others and he just blew us away with his performance. He is Freddie Slater." The role won him the Rising Star at the 28th National Television Awards. Brazier also portrayed Freddie in the 2024 spin-off web miniseries The Point of Mo Return. In June 2025, it was announced that he would be written out of EastEnders later in the year. His last appearance in the series aired on 2 December 2025.

=== Strictly Come Dancing ===
In 2023, Brazier competed in the 21st series of the dancing show Strictly Come Dancing. Together with his dancing partner Dianne Buswell, they finished as runners-up in the final. He also participated in the 2024 Strictly Come Dancing Live! UK tour. Following his stint on the show, pop culture commentator Nick Ede named Brazier "a rare breed of talent" and compared him to Timothée Chalamet and Harry Styles. He opined that both Brazier and Styles "got that look that's appealing to young people, appealing to the mothers, appealing to the guys, they don't really alienate anybody and they have that unique ability to make people happy." In a similar tone, journalist Lucie Cave expressed that "there's a real purity and humility about him that is rare in a young star," and journalist Jacques Peretti said that "what's appealing about him is what appealed about his mother, which is a sort of ingenue innocence." Elaborating on this, public relations expert Mark Borkowski commented that he has "'the suff' – a natural ability to communicate." He said that while "other people have to have it trained in them, and of course we see that inauthenticity," Brazier is "this slightly gauche, naive and beautifully optimistic human being, and people find him naturalistic ... He's gloriously honest at this stage."

=== Other endeavours ===
Alongside his father, Brazier appeared in the 2023 Stand Up to Cancer special of the reality series Celebrity Gogglebox and joined its main cast the following year. In February 2024, he was among the television and social media personalities who met with UK Minister for Loneliness Stuart Andrew at 10 Downing Street to discuss the stigma around loneliness in young people as part of a newly launched Government campaign. Brazier played for England in the 2024 edition of the annual charity football match Soccer Aid to raise money for UNICEF. He also starred as schoolboy James in the 2024 Paramount+ thriller series Curfew, which won him the National Film Award UK for Best Supporting Actor in a TV Series.

== Filmography ==
Year	Title	Role	Notes	Ref.
2005	Jade's Salon	Himself		
2006	Just Jade	Himself		
2008	Living With... Jade	Himself		
2009	Jade: Bride to Be	Himself		
2009	Jade's Wedding	Himself		
2010	Jade: A Year Without Her	Himself		
2021	GCDS: Fall/Winter 2021 at Milan Fashion Week	Himself	Video short; model	
2022–2025	EastEnders	Freddie Slater	Regular role	
2023	Strictly Come Dancing	Himself	Series 21 contestant	
2023–2024	Celebrity Gogglebox	Himself	2023 Stand Up to Cancer special Series 6 regular	
2024	The Point of Mo Return	Freddie Slater	EastEnders spin-off web miniseries; 6 episodes	
2024	Curfew	James	Main role	

== Awards and nominations ==
Year	Award	Category	Work	Result	Ref.
2023	National Television Awards	Rising Star	EastEnders	Won	
2023	Inside Soap Awards	Best Newcomer	EastEnders	Shortlisted	
2023	Inside Soap Awards	Best Comic Performance	EastEnders	Longlisted	
2025	National Film Awards UK	Best Supporting Actor in a TV Series	Curfew	Won	
