= Rob Yeung =

British psychologist and management author

- Education: Ph.D. psychology, Institute of Psychiatry, King's College London
- Occupation: Psychologist
- Employer: Talentspace
- Website: www.robyeung.com

Rob Yeung is a British psychologist and management author. He has published research studies on personality in academic journals, particularly Personality and Individual Differences. He writes a column on confidence for UK newspaper The Daily Telegraph and contributes to newspapers including Financial Times, The Guardian and The Sunday Times. He appears on television programmes including CNBC news, Celebrity Big Brother, BBC Breakfast, CNN news, and Working Lunch on the BBC. He is a columnist for Accounting and Business, a periodical published ten times a year by the Association of Chartered Certified Accountants (ACCA).

He is a Director at Talentspace, a leadership consulting firm. He has a B.Sc. in psychology from University of Bristol and a Ph.D. in psychology from King's College London, University of London. He is a chartered psychologist and Associate Fellow of the British Psychological Society.

He previously presented the BBC television series Who Would Hire You? in which real life candidates went through the recruitment process. He also presented a further series for the BBC entitled How To Get Your Dream Job and has been an expert on Big Brother's Little Brother. He assisted Jade Goody in her search for a personal assistant in the 2006 Living series Jade's P.A and Pete Burns in the 2007 series Pete's PA. He was the resident psychologist for the 2007 BBC Three series The Restaurant: You're Fried!. He acted as resident psychologist on both Celebrity Big Brother and Big Brother in 2009.

== Works ==
- 2020 – 10% Better: Easy Ways to Beat Stress, Think Smarter, Get Healthy and Achieve Any Goal
- 2017 – Confidence 2.0: The New Science of Self-Confidence
- 2015 – How To Stand Out: Proven Tactics for Getting Noticed
- 2014 – How To Win: The Argument, the Pitch, the Job, the Race
- 2013 – Confidence: Transform the way you feel so you can achieve the things you want
- 2012 – You Can Change Your Life: Easy steps to getting what you want
- 2012 – E is for Exceptional: The new science of success
- 2011 – I Is For Influence: The new science of persuasion
- 2011 – Confidence: The power to take control and live the life you want
- 2010 – The Extra One Per Cent: How small changes make exceptional people
- 2009 – Personality: How to unleash your hidden strengths
- 2009 – Job Hunting for Rookies
- 2008 – Confidence: The art of getting whatever you want
- 2008 – Successful Interviewing and Recruitment (Sunday Times Creating Success)
- 2008 – Should I Sleep with the Boss? And 99 Other Questions about Having a Great Career
- 2008 – Should I Tell the Truth? And 99 Other Questions about Succeeding at Interviews and Job Hunting
- 2007 – The Rules of Entrepreneurship
- 2006 – Answering Tough Interview Questions for Dummies
- 2006 – Public Speaking and Presentations for Dummies (co-written with Malcolm Kushner)
- 2006 – The Rules of EQ
- 2006 – The Rules of Office Politics
- 2006 – The Rules of Networking
- 2004 – Successful Interviews Every Time
- 2003 – Coaching People
- 2002 – Making Workshops Work
- 2001 – Anyone Can Sell
