= Jade Changed My Life =

- Starring: Jade Goody (Archive footage); Jackiey Budden; Jeff Brazier; Max Clifford
- Country of origin: United Kingdom
- No. of episodes: 1

Production
- Producer: Sarah Caplin
- Production location: United Kingdom
- Running time: 60 minutes

Original release
- Network: Sky Living
- Release: March 22, 2011

Related
- Jade: A Year Without Her (2010)

Jade Changed My Life is a tribute special that aired on Sky Living which aired on the second anniversary of Jade Goody's death with interviews from family and friends and also how Goody helped raise awareness with interviews from various women who found out they had the same illness due to the awareness Goody made during her battle through media attention.

== Concept ==
Jade Changed My Life centered on the reality TV star's ex Jeff Brazier, widower Jack Tweed and mother Jackiey Budden, who talked about how they have coped in the aftermath of her death. The show also concentrated on how Jade fought to raise awareness of cervical cancer before her death on Mother's Day. Sarah Caplin, the producer of the programme, told The Sun: "We feel Jade would want us to continue to help raise awareness of the disease."

Jeff Brazier, the father of her two sons, Bobby and Freddy, talked about how his children have coped since they lost their mother. Jack Tweed broke his silence about life after Jade, opening up about his daily struggles as her widower. And Jade's mother, Jackiey Budden, spoke honestly about how she still finds life hard without her daughter.

Previously unseen footage was shown for the first time in the show.
