= Jade: With Love =

- Starring: Jade Goody (Archive footage); Jackiey Budden; Jack Tweed
- Country of origin: United Kingdom
- Original language: English
- No. of series: 1
- No. of episodes: 2

Production
- Producer: Kate Jackson
- Production location: UK
- Running time: 60 mins
- Production company: Granada Television

Original release
- Network: Living
- Release: 26 March – 9 April 2009

Jade: With Love is a two-part tribute special that aired on Living after Jade Goody died on 22 March 2009 that aired a week after her death celebrating her life from her early career in 2002 up until her death and final television appearance in February 2009. The show looked back at all her reality shows and also battling through her last months of her life and marrying Jack Tweed. It showed exclusive footage of her funeral and ended with a montage with the ABBA hit "Slipping Through My Fingers" playing as the final song in the background.

Various family members and close friends gave personal and open interviews about the late star during the two tributes.

Part 1 aired on 26 March 2009 and Part 2 aired on 9 April 2009.
