= Border Patrol (New Zealand TV series) =

New Zealand television series

- Title Card
- Narrated by: Tim Balme
- Country of origin: New Zealand
- Original language: English
- No. of seasons: 15
- No. of episodes: 152

Production
- Running time: Approx 30 minutes (including commercials)
- Production company: Greenstone TV

Original release
- Network: TVNZ 1
- Release: 2004 – 2025

Related
- Border Security: Australia's Front Line; Border Security: Canada's Front Line; Homeland Security USA; UK Border Force; Customs

Border Patrol is a New Zealand reality television series, focusing on the work at New Zealand's borders of New Zealand Customs Service, the Ministry for Primary Industries, and Immigration New Zealand. The series also features appearances by staff from the Department of Conservation. The first season premiered in 2004, and it is an original New Zealand concept which has now been replicated throughout the world. In 2006, Border Patrol was the winner of the Best Reality Series at the New Zealand Screen Awards. It is narrated by Tim Balme.

Border Patrol is very popular in New Zealand, and regularly wins its timeslot with usually more than 500,000 viewers per episode. In fact, in January 2012, Border Patrol repeats were screened every night on TV One at 7pm, and in one week it was the most watched show every day, reaching a peak of more than 830,000 viewers during the episode that screened on 9 January.

== International broadcasting ==
- In Australia, the series airs under the name Border Patrol (sometimes referred to in on-air promos as Border Patrol NZ to more clearly distinguish it from Border Security) on Channel Seven.
- In the United Kingdom, the series was briefly aired under the name Passport Patrol on Sky Living/Pick TV before later using its original title.
- In Sweden, the series airs under the name Gränsbevakarna Nya Zeeland, on Kanal 9.
- In the United States, the series aired under the name Border Patrol on the National Geographic Channel and was previously available to watch on Netflix, but has been removed as of October 2019.
- In Ireland, the series airs under the name Passport Patrol on Sky Living.
- In Denmark, the series airs under the name Border Patrol on 6'eren.
- In Norway, the series airs under the name Grensevakten New Zealand on TVNorge.
- In Italy it is broadcast on DMAX as Airport Security: Nuova Zelanda

== See also ==
- Biosecurity in New Zealand
- Border Security: Australia's Front Line
- Television in New Zealand
