= Nothing to Declare UK =

British reality television series

Nothing to Declare UK (known as Customs UK for Series 1) is a British reality television series shown from 2008 onwards. It is filmed at Gatwick and Bristol airports, and occasionally shows the work of customs and immigration officials at the Port of Dover, alongside at the airports for the other parts of the time.

All episodes were narrated by Jon Rand.

== See also ==
- Border Security: Australia's Front Line
- UK Border Force
- Airport
