= Jade: My Autobiography =

2006 autobiography of Jade Goody

- Author: Jade Goody
- Publication date: May 2006

My Autobiography is a biography written by reality TV star Jade Goody. It was first published in May 2006 by HarperCollins, and a paperback was due for publication in January 2007; however, the paperback never made it to the printers due to Jade being at the centre of bad media attention at the time. The book made it onto The Sunday Times Best Sellers list by December 2006 (only seven months after publication had made Jade nearly £1 million in profits). In May 2008 (two years after the book's publication), Leon Bailey Green, an online media consultant, revealed that the book had sold in excess of 90,000 copies.

== Sequel ==
The book's success fuelled a second instalment that was originally titled Living and Learning, but the name of the book was changed to Jade: Catch A Falling Star. It was published in October 2008 by John Blake Publishing.
