= Jeff Brazier =

English television presenter (born 1979)

- Born: Jeffrey Carl Smith; 27 May 1979 (age 47); Bracknell, Berkshire, England
- Occupation: Television presenter
- Years active: 2001–present
- Known for: Shipwrecked; I'm a Celebrity...Get Me Out of Here! NOW! This Morning; Dancing on Ice; Loose Women; BT Sport; TNT Sports
- Spouse: Kate Dwyer (m. 2018; sep. 2025)
- Partner: Jade Goody (2002–2004)
- Children: Bobby; Freddy
- Father: Stephen Faldo
Association football career
- Position: Defender
Youth career
- West Ham United
Senior career*
Years	Team	Apps	(Gls)
1996–1998	Leyton Orient		
1997	→ Billericay Town (loan)		
1998	Wivenhoe Town	13	(1)
1998–2000	Canvey Island		
2000	Grays Athletic	18	(1)
2000–2001	Boreham Wood		
2016	AFC Varndeanians		
- * Club domestic league appearances and goals

Jeffrey Carl Brazier (born Jeffrey Carl Smith; 27 May 1979) is an English television presenter. He rose to fame after appearing on the third series of Shipwrecked (2001), before going on to present television shows including Finders Keepers (2006), I'm a Celebrity...Get Me Out of Here! NOW! (2006) and OK! TV (2011), as well as working as a showbiz presenter on This Morning and appearing in advertisements for ambassador for the People's Postcode Lottery. He has also appeared as a contestant on various television shows including I'm Famous and Frightened! (2004), The Farm (2004), Dancing on Ice (2011), Celebrity SAS: Who Dares Wins (2019) and Celebrity MasterChef (2020)

Brazier also played association football, beginning his youth career with West Ham United and has played as a defender for various clubs including Leyton Orient, Billericay Town, Wivenhoe Town, Canvey Island, Grays Athletic, Boreham Wood, AFC Varndeanians.

== Early life and education ==
Brazier was born Jeffrey Carl Smith on 27 May 1979 in Bracknell, Berkshire. His mother Janette Smith was sixteen at the time of his birth, and Brazier was temporarily placed in a foster home after she became unable to cope. She married his stepfather Robert Brazier in 1985, whose surname he adopted. Together, they had Brazier's younger brother Spencer who has cerebral palsy. After they split, Brazier and his brother lived in a women's refuge in Great Yarmouth.

Brazier's biological father, Stephen Faldo, who initially denied paternity, was the skipper of the pleasure boat Marchioness, which sank in the River Thames in central London in 1989 after being hit by a dredger, killing him as well as 50 others. Brazier was raised in Tiptree, near Colchester in Essex and attended Thurstable School, a mixed state comprehensive school in his home town.

== Career ==
In 2001, Brazier took part in the third series of Channel 4 reality television show Shipwrecked, in which he and fifteen other people had to stay on a tropical island without any creature comforts. After this, Brazier took part in the ITV programme Simply the Best, as well as presenting the TV programmes Dirty Laundry and Big Brother Panto with June Sarpong.

In 2003, Brazier appeared in Celebrity Wife Swap with then-girlfriend Jade Goody, opposite Charles Ingram. In July 2004, Brazier appeared as a contestant on the Living TV programme I'm Famous and Frightened!, and in September 2004 won the Channel 5 reality TV show The Farm.

Brazier hosted The X Factor Live Tour in venues all over the United Kingdom and Ireland from 2005 to 2010.

In 2006, Brazier presented the revival of the CITV programme Finders Keepers. Brazier was a panellist on the now defunct ITV talk show Loose @5.30!, a spin-off of Loose Women and has also appeared in The Match and Celebrity Soccer Six on Sky One, where he played for England, as well as appearing on Call Me a Cabbie with Carol Thatcher and Janet Street-Porter. Brazier has also been a This Morning "showbiz" presenter.

In November 2006, Brazier joined the presenting team of ITV2's I'm a Celebrity...Get Me Out of Here! NOW! with Kelly Osbourne in Australia and Mark Durden-Smith hosting at the London Studios. On 16 December 2006, Brazier was a guest reporter on The X Factor final live from contestant Ray Quinn's home town of Liverpool, and live from contestants Same Difference's home town of Portsmouth on 15 December 2007. He was the guest reporter at JLS's home town on 13 December 2008 and at Stacey Solomon's home town of Dagenham on 12 December 2009.

In 2010, Brazier was a celebrity guest team captain on What Do Kids Know? with Rufus Hound, Joe Swash and Sara Cox on Watch, and on 17 December 2010, Brazier presented a documentary, My Brother and Me, which was broadcast on BBC Three. He also appeared on a celebrity special of Total Wipeout and an episode of Mongrels.

From 9 January to 13 March 2011, Brazier participated in the sixth series of the ice skating show Dancing on Ice, with professional female Canadian ice skater Isabelle Gauthier. He was in the bottom two three times: in week two against cricketer Dominic Cork, and in week five against Kerry Katona. In week 10, Brazier and Gauthier were eliminated after the judges votes to save Sam Attwater and his skating partner Brianne Delcourt. From August until December 2011, Brazier co-presented OK! TV on Channel 5 with Jenny Frost.

Brazier is a guest presenter for ITV lifestyle show Sunday Scoop and also has regular stints on the daytime series This Morning. Brazier is an ambassador for People's Postcode Lottery. Brazier also writes a column in the Daily Mirror on a weekly basis.

In 2019, Brazier appeared on the Channel 4 quasi-military training show Celebrity SAS: Who Dares Wins. In 2020, Brazier was a contestant on the fifteenth series of Celebrity MasterChef.

== Personal life ==
Brazier has two sons from his relationship with Big Brother contestant Jade Goody, including Bobby Jack. Brazier and Goody split in 2004, and she subsequently died of cervical cancer in 2009.

On 1 October 2017, Brazier became engaged to his girlfriend Kate Dwyer, and the couple married in Portugal on 15 September 2018. They announced their split in December 2022; however, they rekindled their relationship seven months later.

In November 2025, Brazier and Dwyer announced that they had separated several months previously.

== Filmography ==
As himself
Year	Title	Notes	Ref.
2001	Shipwrecked	Contestant; series 3	
2004	I'm Famous and Frightened!	Contestant; series 2	
2004	The Farm	Contestant; series 1 winner	
2006–present	This Morning	Showbiz / The Hub / competition presenter	
2006	I'm a Celebrity...Get Me Out of Here! NOW!	Presenter	
2011	Dancing on Ice	Contestant; series 6	
2011	OK! TV	Presenter	
2019	Celebrity SAS: Who Dares Wins	Contestant; series 1	
2020	Celebrity MasterChef	Contestant; series 15	
2024	Celebrity Race Across the World	Series 2	
2025	Pilgrimage (TV series)	Main; series 'The Road through the Alps'	

=== Guest appearances ===
- Celebrity Total Wipeout (18 September 2010) – Contestant
- Mongrels (2010) – Guest appearance
- Loose Women (17 May 2011, 30 March 2012) – Guest
- Daybreak (2 March 2012) – Guest
- Tipping Point: Lucky Stars (16 August 2014) – Contestant
