= Customs (TV series) =

- Country of origin: Ireland
- No. of episodes: 6

Production
- Running time: 30 minutes

Original release
- Network: RTÉ One
- Release: 14 September – 19 October 2008

Related
- Border Security: Australia's Front Line; Border Security: Canada's Front Line; Homeland Security USA; Border Security New Zealand; UK Border Force

Customs is a six-part Irish documentary television series that examines the role of customs officers, focusing on their daily lives and their regular encounters with the illegal drug trade and other difficult situations. The series began airing on 14 September 2008 and concluded on 19 October 2008.

The series makers accessed customs officers' daily operations, allowing viewers to see the way the authorities deal with the importation of illegal substances. The series focuses on customs officers at Dublin Airport and Dublin Port as they target cigarette smuggling and illegal drug trade.

== Episodes ==
Six episodes aired between 14 September and 19 October 2008.

No.	Title	Original release date
1	"Programme One"	14 September 2008
At Dublin Airport, undercover officers track a pair of suspected cigarette smugglers, while at Dublin Port Officer Martin Rogers discovers a Colombian Rainbow Boa in luggage.
2	"Programme Two"	21 September 2008
At Dublin Port, Officer Martin Rogers and his team conduct a major search operation on a large cargo ship suspected of carrying illegal goods. Also, Andrea Leamy her sniffer dog Thatcher check over one thousand Welsh rugby fans for drugs when they arrive at Dublin Port. Meanwhile, Officer Robbie's anti-evasion unit searches Cork for illegal fuel users.
3	"Programme Three"	28 September 2008
At Dublin Airport, one passenger is discovered to be carrying hundreds of thousands of Euro in their luggage. Also, with the help of the Airport police and Gardai, customs officers set up a roadblock at the airport's exit, which yields a haul of smuggled cigarettes. In Cork a customs search team seizes 6,000 sumggled cigarettes from a market stallholder. Meanwhile, in Wexford customs officers patrol the coastline searching for bales of cocaine.
4	"Programme Four"	5 October 2008
At Dundalk Bus Station, Andrea Leamy and her sniffer dog Thatcher discover some cannabis. At Dublin airport, with the help of Storm, another sniffer dog, a passenger is discovered to be carrying €10,000 undeclared. Elsewhere in Dublin, two packages of cannabis are discovered at the An Post distribution centre. Meanwhile, at Cork Airport sniffer dogs detect passengers from Amsterdam carrying cannabis.
5	"Programme Five"	12 October 2008
Officer Martin Rogers conducts dawn raids across Dublin searching for smuggled tobacco. At Dublin airport one passenger is discovered to be sumggling €40,000 worth of Limovan from Spain into Ireland illegally. Also, when officers find cannabis in one man's luggage, he tries to run for the exit but is tackled by Officer Ken.
6	"Programme Six"	19 October 2008
At Dublin Airport, a kilogram of cocaine is discovered in an airmail parcel labelled as a child's toy, while more cannabis is found on passengers from Amsterdam. Meanwhile, Officer Martin Rogers seizes a BMW when he discovers that the VRT has not been paid.

== Broadcast ==
The series aired in Ireland on RTÉ One on Sunday evenings at 7:30pm from 14 September 2008. The series was broadcast in the UK on Pick TV in 2011.
