= Trolley Dollies =

- Country of origin: United Kingdom
- No. of episodes: 20

Production
- Running time: 25 min approx

Original release
- Network: Living TV
- Release: March 2005 – April 2005

Trolley Dollies is a 20-part TV documentary series aired on British digital network LIVING in 2005. It followed the lives of a number of cabin crew at UK charter airline Excel Airways.

During the series, Excel Airways crew travelled to various countries. The show followed their lives both in and out of work, both on the aircraft and downroute on stop-overs at exotic destinations such as Tobago, Goa and Africa. The series was produced by Granada Productions for LIVING. It was narrated by Brian Dowling. The storylines included the relationship between gay couple Den and David, crew member Sally searching for her ideal man, and Janine's cosmetic surgery.

The show was cancelled after one series but continues to be popular in re-runs on both LIVING and LIVING2.
