= Jade's Salon =

- Starring: Jade Goody; Jackiey Budden; Ryan Amoo; Bobby Brazier; Freddy Brazier
- Country of origin: United Kingdom
- No. of series: 1
- No. of episodes: 7

Production
- Producer: Kate Jackson
- Production location: United Kingdom
- Running time: 60 mins

Original release
- Network: Living
- Release: 12 September – 24 October 2005

Jade's Salon is Jade Goody's first ever reality show, depicting Jade's opening of her first business "Ugly's". It aired on Living television and was a hit for the channel.

Living re-ran the show all weekend following the death of Goody on 22 March 2009.
