= Jade's P.A =

- Starring: Jade Goody; Heather Howard; Daniel Abineri
- Country of origin: United Kingdom
- No. of series: 1
- No. of episodes: 10

Production
- Production location: UK
- Running time: 60 mins
- Production company: Ruggie Media

Original release
- Network: Living
- Release: 9 October – 13 November 2006

Related
- Jade's Shape Challenge (2006); Jade: A Year Without Her (2010)

Jade's P.A is a British Living reality television series following the since deceased Jade Goody teaming up with celebrity PA Heather Howard and recruitment psychologist Dr Rob Yeung to put 10 wannabe PAs through a series of gruelling tasks. Following her death on 22 March 2009 Sky Living re ran the series.

== Episodes ==
=== Episode 1 ===
Reality series in which hopefuls compete to become Jade Goody's assistant. The wannabes undergo an audition with some testing tasks and endure a severe grilling.

=== Episode 2 ===
The 10 finalists visit Jade's house, where they are tested on skills vital to any personal assistant - negotiation techniques and cocktail-making.

=== Episode 3 ===
Fashion expert Carly Brook teaches the hopefuls the basics of putting an outfit together, and challenges them to create a look for one of Jade's photo shoots.

=== Episode 4 ===
Organisation expert Catherine Nicholson analyses the contestants through psychometric tests and the contents of their handbags.

=== Episode 5 ===
Jade hires an undercover journalist and secretly films the hopefuls in interviews to test their discretion.

=== Episode 6 ===
The hopefuls go back to school to learn the necessary skills to enable them to brief Jade prior to interviews.

=== Episode 7 ===
The remaining three hopefuls are given their toughest assignments yet, as the prize of becoming Jade's PA draws closer.

=== Episode 8 ===
The two remaining hopefuls are pushed to their limit in the final task, which involves planning a huge charity bash with no budget.

=== Episode 9 ===
The final two are pushed to their limit when they are challenged to organise a charity event with no budget, and some old faces return to give their opinion on who should win.

=== Episode 10 ===
A special edition which follows the winner home as they prepare for the biggest role of their career - personal assistant to reality TV star Jade Goody. Last in series.

== Pete's P.A ==
The show returned as Pete's PA, again airing on Living from 8 October 2007 to 5 December 2007, this time following musician and Dead or Alive frontman Pete Burns as he hunted for a new personal assistant (PA). Psychologist Dr Rob Yeung returned, but Heather Howard didn't, replaced by celebrity PA Donna Coulling. Filmed over ten weeks, the potential PAs were pitted against each other in a series of challenges. The ten-episode contest concluded with a former criminal psychologist, Nicky, winning the competition.
