= I'm Famous and Frightened! =

Television series

- Genre: Reality, Mystery
- Presented by: Tim Vincent and Brian Dowling (series 1); Keith Chegwin (series 2–3); Claire Sweeney (series 4)
- No. of series: 4
- No. of episodes: 12

Production
- Running time: 180 minutes (per episode)
- Production company: Scream Films

Original release
- Network: Living
- Release: 12 March 2004 – 7 February 2005

Related
- I'm Famous and Frightened Extra

I'm Famous and Frightened! is a Living TV reality TV show in which eight celebrities stayed for three nights in a "haunted" castle. They had to then do terrifying challenges to raise money for charity; each one was evicted until only the winner was left. From Series 2 onwards, a spin-off show, titled I'm Famous and Frightened Extra was introduced, presented by Brian Dowling.

== Series 1 (2004) ==
The first series was set in Chillingham Castle in Northumberland. Broadcast live on satellite television over the weekend from 12 to 14 March 2004, the show reached 2.3 million viewers. It was presented by Tim Vincent and Brian Dowling.

The featured celebrities were:

Celebrity	Known for	Status
Garry Bushell	Columnist	Eliminated 1st
Terry Nutkins	Naturalist & television presenter	Eliminated 2nd
Toby Anstis	Television & radio presenter	Eliminated 3rd
Linsey Dawn McKenzie	Glamour model	Eliminated 4th
Cheryl Baker	Bucks Fizz singer	Eliminated 5th
Keith Chegwin	Television presenter	Third place
Linda Robson	Birds of a Feather actress	Runner-up
Julie Goodyear	Former Coronation Street actress	Winner

== Series 2 (2004) ==
The second series was set in Fyvie Castle in Aberdeenshire and was presented by former contestant, Keith Chegwin. Start date: 16 July 2004.

The featured celebrities were:

Celebrity	Known for	Status
John Noakes	Former Blue Peter presenter	Eliminated 1st
Anne Charleston	Former Neighbours actress	Eliminated 2nd
Adele Silva	Emmerdale actress	Eliminated 3rd
Terry Christian	Broadcaster & journalist	Eliminated 4th
Jeff Brazier	Television presenter	Eliminated 5th
Andy Kane	Changing Rooms builder	Third place
Danniella Westbrook	Former EastEnders actress	Runner-up
Rustie Lee	Chef & television personality	Winner

== Series 3 (2004) ==
The third series was set in Dover Castle and was still presented by Keith Chegwin. Start date: 2 October 2004.

Celebrity	Known for	Status
Colin Jackson	Olympic hurdler	
Jo Guest	Glamour model	
Nancy Sorrell	Model & wife of Vic Reeves	
Richard Blackwood	Actor & presenter	
Roy Walker	Comedian & presenter	
Tamara Beckwith	Socialite	
Ricardo Ribeiro	Television personality	Runner-up
Faith Brown	Chef & television personality	Winner

== Series 4 (2005) ==
The fourth series aired in February 2005; it was set in Bolsover Castle and was presented by Claire Sweeney.

Celebrity	Known for	Status
Colin Jackson	Olympic hurdler	
Christopher Biggins	Actor & television presenter	
Jonathan Coleman	Television presenter	
Lee Latchford-Evans	Steps singer	
Lucy Pinder	Glamour model	
Martin Offiah	Rugby player	
Toyah Willcox	Actress & singer	
Ruth Madoc	Hi-de-Hi! actress	Winner

== Transmissions ==
Series	Start date	End date	Episodes
1	12 March 2004	14 March 2004	3
2	16 July 2004	18 July 2004	3
3	2 October 2004	4 October 2004	3
4	5 February 2005	7 February 2005	3
