= Homeland Security USA =

- Created by: Arnold Shapiro
- Starring: Various
- Narrated by: Phil Crowley, Grant Bowler (For Australian and New Zealand Viewers)
- Country of origin: United States
- No. of seasons: 1
- No. of episodes: 13 (2 unaired)

Production
- Executive producer: Arnold Shapiro
- Running time: 44 minutes

Original release
- Network: ABC
- Release: January 6 – September 6, 2009

Related
- Border Security: Australia's Front Line; Border Security: Canada's Front Line; Border Security New Zealand; UK Border Force; Customs

Homeland Security USA, or Border Security: America's Frontline/Border Security USA for Australian viewers, is a 2009 reality television series. It portrayed members of the U.S. Department of Homeland Security, and other agencies tasked with the security of the US, performing their day-to-day duties. It was the American version of the Australian reality show Border Security: Australia's Front Line. The show premiered on January 6, 2009, on ABC and was put on hiatus May 19, 2009. The show featured officers within Homeland Security, who fought various crimes such as drug trafficking. A few months after the premiere ABC aired episodes on weekend afternoons.

== Episodes ==
No.	Title	Original release date	Viewers (millions)
1	"This is Your Car on Drugs"	January 6, 2009	7.77
2	"Looks Like It's Been Through an Autopsy"	January 13, 2009	6.04
3	"It's Not A Cow. It's A Guinea Pig"	January 27, 2009	5.60
4	"These Are Human Skulls So They Had to Belong to Somebody"	February 3, 2009	5.61
5	"I Did One Stupid Mistake. It Cost My Whole Life."	February 17, 2009	4.71
6	"Manatees? Y'know. Whatever. They're Cool."	February 24, 2009	6.14
7	"There Could Be a Tiger in There"	March 3, 2009	5.68
8	"They Call Me the Rottweiler"	March 10, 2009	5.15
9	"What Kind of Grades Did You Get in Recess?"	August 10, 2009	4.12
10	"We're a Nation of Immigrants. All of Us."	August 16, 2009	3.92
11	"There Goes Another Broken Heart Thanks to CBP"	August 23, 2009	3.27
12	"Were You Actually on The Bachelor?"	August 30, 2009	4.38
13	"Strip Clubs. Open on Thursday. Hmmm."	September 6, 2009	3.97
