= GCDS =

Italian fashion line

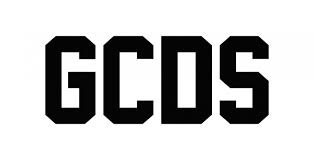
- Industry: Fashion
- Founded: 2015
- Founders: Giuliano Calza; Giordano Calza
- Headquarters: Milan, Italy
- Website: gcds.it

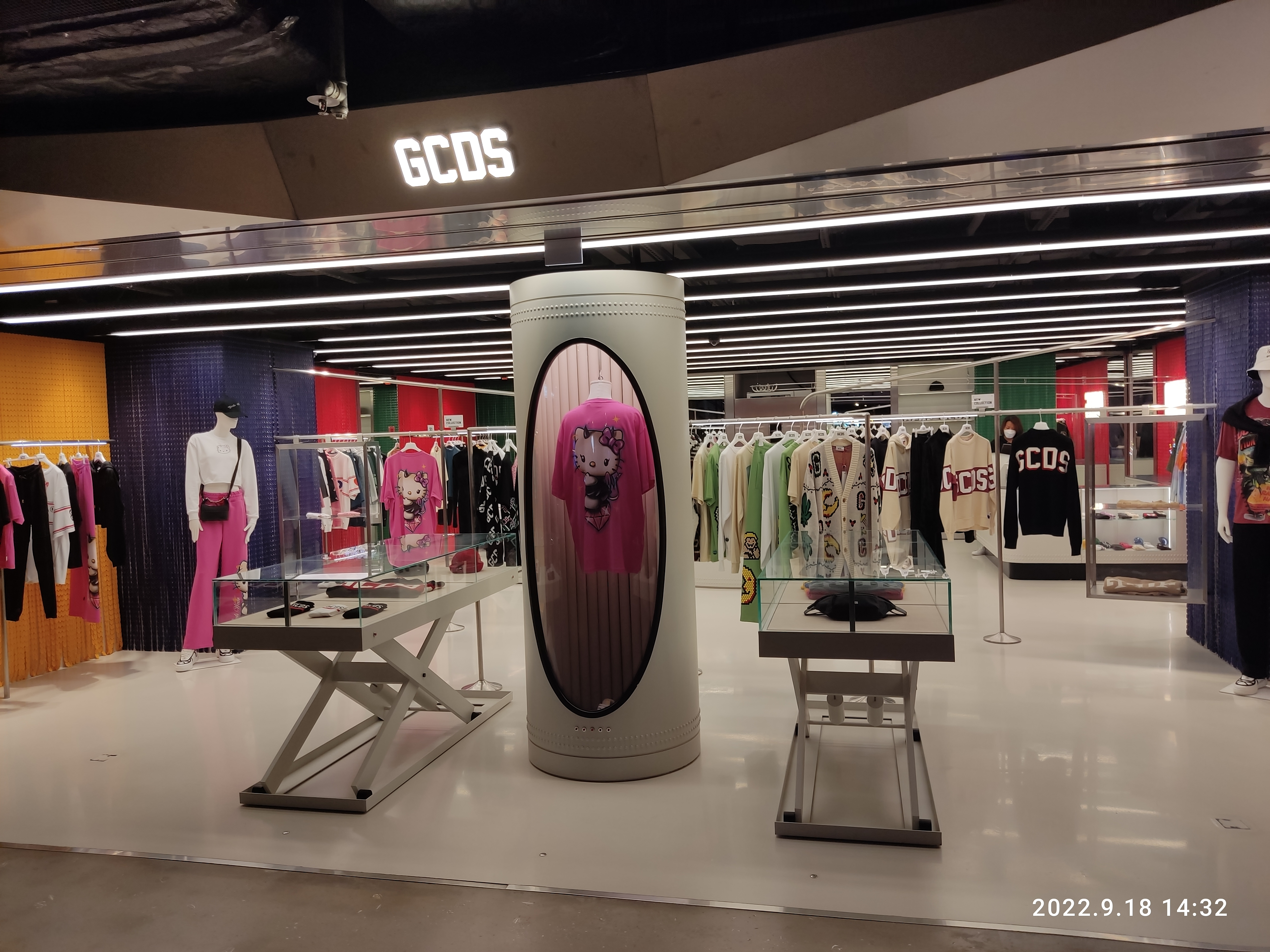

GCDS is an Italian fashion line. The name stands for Giuliano Calza Design Studio.

== History ==
GCDS was founded in 2015 by brothers Giuliano and Giordano Calza in Milan, Italy. The first pieces of clothing developed by the line were sweatshirts with the GCDS logo on the front. There were only 100 sweatshirts made in the first attempt. At the time the shirts were made in China, however the line is now made entirely in Italy. Initially the company only sold its products online, before being picked up by retail locations.

== Company overview ==
Giuliano Calza is the label's creative director, and Giordano Calza is the label's chief executive officer. In 2016 GCDS opened its first flagship store in Piazza Gae Aulenti. In 2017 sales for the company reached €5 million, growing to €10 million in 2018, and in 2018 its clothing was available in about 350 retail locations. The company has store locations in Italy, Shanghai, Hong Kong, and Beijing.

The brand name is more commonly known as “Giuliano Calza Design Studio”, "God Can't Destroy Streetwear", "Girls Can Desire Sex" “Giuliano Calza Does SpongeBob”,

== Collections ==
Soon after founding, the company expanded its clothing items to include t-shirts, jackets, raincoats, and other garments. It now creates a Spring/Summer line, Men's wear line, Fall/Winter line, its "Skater or die" collection, and some limited edition collaborations, such as its “Made in LA” line. They also create accessories and in 2018 they released their first children's wear collection GCDS Mini. GCDS exhibits its new seasons at Milan Fashion Week, and has shown at the New York Fashion Week as well. The 2019 Spring/Summer collection was inspired by a science fiction motif, specifically the 1980s and 1990s, in addition to cartoons and manga. As a part of the runway show, some models walking the catwalk were fitted with a third prosthetic breast.

In 2019 GCDS released a line of lipsticks called GCDS Beauty, which included a lipstick called THC and which contains a PH reagent that causes a chemical color change in the lips.

In November 2021, the label launched a collection in collaboration with Bratz.

In March 2022, the label collaborated with One Piece for its Spring/Summer 2022 collection.
