= Jade Goody =

English media personality (1981–2009)

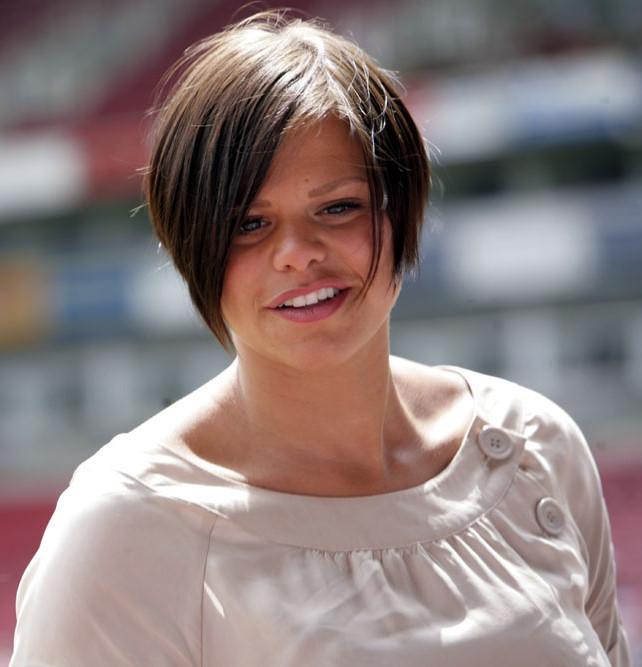
- Goody in 2007
- Born: 5 June 1981; London, England
- Died: 22 March 2009 (aged 27); Upshire, Essex, England
- Resting place: Epping Forest
- Occupations: Media personality; businesswoman
- Years active: 2002–2009
- Known for: Big Brother
- Spouse: Jack Tweed (m. 2009)
- Partner: Jeff Brazier (2002–2004)
- Children: 2, including Bobby Brazier
- Mother: Jackiey Budden

Jade Cerisa Lorraine Goody (5 June 1981 – 22 March 2009) was an English media personality and businesswoman. She rose to fame as a contestant on the third series of the Channel 4 reality show Big Brother in 2002. Following her eviction from the show, Goody went on to star in her own television programmes, which in turn led to her launching a variety of products under her own name.

Immediately criticised by the British press for her perceived lack of decorum and intelligence, Goody was dubbed by multiple outlets as "the most hated woman in Britain". The country's celebrity magazines were less derisive, publishing reports of her affable nature and competent school performance from those who knew her. Public opinion of Goody reached its most negative in January 2007, when she was involved in the Big Brother racism controversy while appearing as a housemate on Celebrity Big Brother 5. Following her eviction, she made a number of apologies, but continued to garner negative public reactions.

In August 2008, Goody participated in Bigg Boss, the Indian version of Big Brother, but left the show early and returned to the UK after finding out that she had cervical cancer. By February 2009, the cancer had metastasized and she was terminally ill. Goody died from cervical cancer in the early hours of 22 March 2009, at the age of 27. Public opinion of Goody had softened by the time of her death. Sky Living broadcast five tribute shows from 2009 to 2012, documenting her life.

== Early life ==
Jade Cerisa Lorraine Goody was born in King's College Hospital in London on 5 June 1981, the daughter of English mother Jackiey Budden and English-Jamaican father Andrew Goody. Her paternal grandfather, Winston Coyne, was from the West Indies and emigrated to the United Kingdom in 1956. Supporters of the far-right National Front (NF) verbally abused Goody's father. Her mother was a drug addict and her father was a pimp. Goody's father suffered from substance dependence and had a criminal history, including a four-year term for robbery. He and Budden separated when Goody was two; estranged from his daughter while Budden raised her, he died of a drug overdose in Bournemouth in August 2005. At the age of five, Goody made an uncredited appearance as a primary school student in the 1986 television film London's Burning, which later spawned the television series of the same name. Before entering the Big Brother house, Goody worked as a dental nurse and lived in Upshire, Essex, where she was still living when she died.

== Career ==
=== 2002–2003: Big Brother 3 ===
When Goody appeared on Big Brother 3, she was ridiculed by the British tabloid press for her lack of general knowledge. She thought the English city of Cambridge was in London; when told that it was in East Anglia, she assumed East Anglia was outside Britain and referred to it as "East Angula". She was also criticised by the tabloid press during her time in the Big Brother house for backstabbing and an evening when she cavorted drunk and naked.

=== 2003–2006: Initial fame and Sky Living series ===
Goody appeared in her own reality TV shows and, regularly, in celebrity, trivia and gossip-oriented women's magazines such as Heat and OK!. She participated in the 2006 London Marathon but did not finish (collapsing after 34 km [21 mi] of the 42.195-kilometre [26.219 mi] course), and recovered overnight at the Royal London Hospital. Before the marathon, Goody described her preparations to TV chef Gordon Ramsay: "I've been eating curry, Chinese and drinking." She said afterwards, "I don't really understand miles. I didn't actually know how far it was going to be ... I didn't want to let everyone down." Goody raised £565.20 for her chosen charity, the National Society for the Prevention of Cruelty to Children.

On 16 February 2004, Goody entered the Back to Reality house on Channel 5. The series, similar to Big Brother, featured contestants from other reality shows such as Big Brother and I'm a Celebrity...Get Me Out of Here!. She was evicted on day 20.

In 2005, Goody created and introduced her own fragrance (Shh...) with distributor Jigsaw ESL, who gave its exclusive rights to Superdrug. Shh... became Superdrug's third-bestselling fragrance, behind Kylie Minogue's and Victoria Beckham's. On 2 May 2006, Jade: My Autobiography was published. That same year she won a celebrity edition of the ITV singing game show Stars in Their Eyes as Lynn Anderson performing "Rose Garden".

=== 2007–2008: Celebrity Big Brother 5 and controversy ===
On 5 January 2007 Goody, her boyfriend Jack Tweed and her mother entered the house for Celebrity Big Brother 5. She had just attained 25th place in a Heat poll of the world's most influential people, with lifetime earnings of £8 million. A number of complaints were received by British broadcasting regulator Ofcom about the behaviour of Jo O'Meara, Danielle Lloyd and Goody towards housemate Shilpa Shetty. By 20 January Ofcom received more than 44,500 complaints from the public (a record at the time), and Channel 4 received an additional 3,000 complaints.

Among Goody's remarks were, "I've seen how she goes in and out of people's arseholes" and Shetty "makes [her] skin crawl". She also called Shetty "Shilpa Fuckawalla" and "Shilpa Poppadom". In an unaired late-night limerick game between O'Meara, Lloyd, Goody and Tweed, the word "Paki" was implied but not said. Goody allegedly wondered aloud if Lloyd used "the P-word", and referred to Shetty as "Shilpa Pashwa whoever you fucking are".

The incident triggered an international outcry, receiving extensive coverage in the Indian media (where Gordon Brown, then British Chancellor of the Exchequer, was visiting at the time). Brown condemned the programme for damaging the impression of Britain as a country of tolerance. In a 17 January statement, Channel 4 defended the programme against charges "of overt racism or racial abuse".

Goody was evicted from the Big Brother house on 19 January 2007, receiving 82 per cent of the vote when she was up against Shetty. Channel 4 prevented crowds from gathering outside the house, and cancelled her scheduled press conference. In an interview with Davina McCall shortly afterwards, Goody said she was "disgusted with [her]self" after seeing a video of the alleged bullying. Her much-publicised return to the Big Brother house was called "a terrible decision" by publicist Max Clifford: "It looks like she has ruined a very lucrative career". At this time Goody was a supporter of the anti-bullying charity Act Against Bullying, which dropped her. In an interview with the Daily Star, Goody said that her abuse of Shetty ruined her girl-next-door image.

Although Shetty did not lodge an official complaint about racist behaviour with Big Brother, her allegations compelled police to investigate the possible classification of her treatment as "racial hatred" under Part III of the Public Order Act 1986. In a statement, the Hertfordshire police said that it was "investigating allegations of racist behaviour in the Big Brother house and will be conducting enquiries, including a review of the tapes. We will continue to liaise with Ofcom and with Endemol, whom we have strongly encouraged to ensure that any form of behaviour that could raise similar concerns, does not occur. We will continue to closely monitor the situation over the next few days. Hertfordshire Constabulary will not tolerate racism in any form and is taking these allegations seriously. The constabulary has experience of investigating and resolving incidents in the Big Brother house in past seasons".

According to a Channel 4 spokeswoman, Big Brother intervened so the contestants would "realise that what they have said has been misconstrued in the house". The idea, she said, was to allow the housemates "to explain themselves" to their fellow contestants. This was followed by a series of apologies to Shetty from the housemates, and her belief that Goody was not a racist: "I don't feel there was any racial discrimination happening from Jade's end ... I think that there are a lot of insecurities from her end but it's definitely not racial". However, Shetty was unaware of all the alleged insults (often made behind her back). Channel 4 was rebuked by Ofcom, which received more than 54,000 complaints, for its handling of the scandal.

Goody initially denied that her comments were racist: "She is Indian, thinking of an Indian name and only thing I could think of was Indian food. Wasn't racial at all. It was not to offend any Indian out there." On a later trip to India she apologised for her behaviour, admitting that her remarks to Shetty could be seen as racist. In a video on the BBC News website, Goody said, "I know that things that I don't think are necessarily racist ... could be ... And I am sincerely sorry for the pain and hurt I've caused to Shilpa's family. I am wrong ... I am wrong and I know that my words and my actions were wrong and I'm not trying to justify that in any way – I am wrong, and the people who have complained are not wrong. They're just insulted by me and I completely take that criticism."

=== 2008–2009: Return to the public eye, Bigg Boss and final projects ===
Goody said in April 2008 that she planned to introduce her second fragrance line, Controversial. In mid-2008, she appeared on Bigg Boss 2, the Indian version of Big Brother, at a rumoured salary of £100,000. Goody entered the house on 17 August, saying in her opening videotape that the incident with Shetty was "in the past" and she was "not proud of it". Two days into the show she was diagnosed with cervical cancer and immediately withdrew, flying home to England. Scenes of Goody learning of her diagnosis were not broadcast in India.

A reality-television documentary, Living with Jade Goody, was shown in September 2008 as part of the Living with... series on Living TV. In October she opened her second beauty salon, "Homme Fatel" (for men), and her second autobiography (Jade: Catch a Falling Star, covering her time on Celebrity Big Brother 5) was published by John Blake Publishing. A documentary film, Jade's Cancer Battle, was aired on 11 December with further shows planned if Goody could participate. At the end of 2008, she played the Wicked Queen in a Christmas pantomime version of Snow White at the Theatre Royal, Lincoln to critical praise, but withdrew from the production in January 2009 for health reasons.

== Personal life ==
Goody had two sons during her 2002 to 2004 relationship with television presenter Jeff Brazier: Bobby, who was born in June 2003 and Freddy, who was born in September 2004. In 2006, she began a relationship with Jack Tweed, who appeared with her on Celebrity Big Brother. In June 2007, she had a miscarriage. After allegations of Tweed's infidelity they broke up, later reconciling. Tweed lived with Goody and her children in Buckhurst Hill, Essex, until his imprisonment for a December 2006 assault on a 16-year-old boy. He served four months of an 18-month sentence before his release on 27 January 2009, with electronic monitoring and a curfew.

Goody and Tweed exchanged rings on 15 February in a private, informal ceremony on the banks of the River Thames, and they married on 22 February at Down Hall country house. Goody wore a £3,500 Manuel Mota dress, a gift from Harrods owner Mohamed Al-Fayed. The couple signed an exclusive £700,000 deal with OK! magazine for photographs of the ceremony, and Tweed was exempted from his curfew for 22 and 23 February.

== Illness and death ==
Goody had a number of health scares during the 2000s. In 2002 (shortly before her Big Brother 3 appearance) a cervical smear test revealed abnormal cells, a possible indicator of cancer. She was tested for iridocyclitis in 2004 and bowel cancer in 2006, with negative results for each. Goody had hospital tests in early August 2008, after her fourth cancer scare; she had collapsed four times. On 19 August, while she was on the Indian reality show Bigg Boss, Goody was told that test results confirmed cervical cancer. According to her spokesperson, "It looks like her cancer is at an early stage but we will have to wait until she gets back to Britain and sees a specialist and has more tests".

On 1 September 2008, it was reported that Goody's cancer was "advanced and life-threatening" and she would have surgery followed by chemotherapy. Doctors gave her a 65 per cent chance of survival. Further tests and a radical hysterectomy "went well", according to her publicist, and Goody began chemotherapy and radiotherapy. In an interview with Irish broadcaster RTÉ, Goody said she had begun planning her funeral, was losing her hair and had decided not to explain her illness to her children, five-year old Bobby and four-year old Freddy, at the time.

On 4 February 2009, Goody's publicist, Max Clifford, confirmed that her cancer had spread to her liver, bowel and groin. A previous 40 per cent chance of survival was withdrawn, and she began treatment to prolong her life. On 7 February, Clifford reported that Goody had emergency surgery in London to remove a tumour on her bowel.

On 14 February, Clifford confirmed media reports that doctors at the Royal Marsden Hospital in London had classified her cancer as terminal; she could die within weeks, and at best was unlikely to survive more than a few months: "She was informed yesterday that tragically, she's terminally ill. She was obviously devastated." Goody then began drawing up a will and planning for the care of her two sons.

On 5 March in the Royal Marsden Hospital, Goody asked to be baptised; two days later, she and her sons were christened. Clifford confirmed that this was her last public appearance, and she had already said her goodbyes to her family: "We're hoping and praying that Jade pulls through, but the fact of the matter is that she now only has a short time to live." He confirmed that during the next 24 hours her doctors could assess how long Goody had to live, but she had a very short time left in any case. Jack Tweed was allowed to extend his curfew, spending a last night with his wife before she said goodbye to the rest of her family.

When the news spread that Goody's cancer was terminal, medical authorities in the UK began reporting a surge in requests from women (particularly younger women) for cervical-cancer screening. This reversed a trend which had seen demand for screening decline over the past decade, with the greatest decline among women aged 25–29.

As a result of the publicity surrounding Goody's illness, on 13 March 2009 government health ministers agreed to review the National Health Service policy not to screen for cervical cancer until age 25 in England (age 20 in the rest of the UK). That day, she issued a press release that she was "immensely proud" to have prompted the review.

Goody died in her sleep at her home in Upshire, Essex, in the early hours of 22 March 2009, at the age of 27. Her reported time of death varies by source. Her mother, husband, and family friend Kevin Adams were at her bedside when she died. Her funeral service took place at noon on 4 April at St John the Baptist Church in Buckhurst Hill, Essex, and she was buried in her wedding dress later that day near her home in Epping Forest. The funeral cortège included a Bentley. Her sons did not attend the funeral. Thousands of mourners followed the funeral service on large screens outside the church. It was broadcast live on Sky News, which followed the service from outside since Goody had wanted a private ceremony for friends and family.

== Media coverage ==
=== Tributes ===
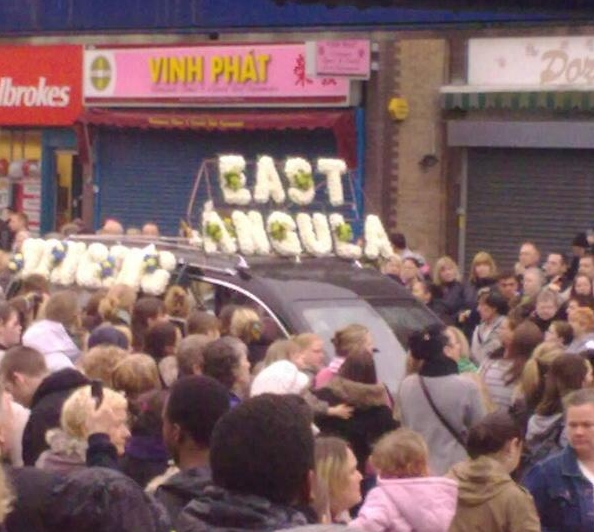
A car in Goody's funeral procession in The Blue, with East Angula [sic] spelt out in flowers

Goody's death was widely covered by the British media, and the BBC was criticised for its extensive coverage of her illness. She received tributes from many different areas of society. British Prime Minister Gordon Brown said that she was "a courageous woman both in life and death and the whole country has admired her determination to provide a bright future for her children". From 2009 to 2012, Sky Living aired five tributes to Goody, documenting her early life, fame, and final months. The final episode of Big Brother on Channel 4 featured a 15-minute tribute, praising her as the ultimate Big Brother contestant.

In April 2009, Digital Spy called Goody the "ultimate reality TV star", and plans were announced for Jade the Musical. That month Michael Parkinson wrote that Goody had become media property "to be manipulated and exploited till the day she died", representing "all that is paltry and wretched about Britain". On 29 December 2009 The Independent reported that, according to an online tribute site, Goody was the most-mourned celebrity of 2009 and received over 600 tributes, which was more than Patrick Swayze, Farrah Fawcett and Michael Jackson who had all died that year too. The premiere of Big Brother 10 was dedicated to her memory, and a tribute was shown on the last episode of Ultimate Big Brother.

A show aired from 7 to 21 August 2019 documenting her life from her rise to fame to her death featuring never before seen footage and contributors to the programme who had never discussed Jade publicly since her death, including Davina McCall, Dermot O'Leary and her ex-partner and father of her children, Jeff Brazier.

=== Cervical cancer awareness ===
The day of Goody's funeral, a spokeswoman for Cancer Research UK said:

Jade's story has raised awareness of cervical cancer which has led to hundreds of thousands of people contacting Cancer Research UK for information on the disease as the number of hits to our website, CancerHelp.org shows. Her legacy will be to help save lives.

In October 2009, it was reported that the number of women between 25 and 64 having pap testing the United Kingdom had grown by 12 per cent during the previous year, an increase (after year-to-year declines since 2002) credited to Goody's public battle with cervical cancer. Sky News health correspondent Thomas Moore said:

This is a tremendous fillip for the NHS screening programme. Jade Goody had a particular impact on the women the NHS struggles to reach—the young and the less well educated. The challenge for public health doctors now is to ensure that this rise is sustained, so that Jade has a long-lasting legacy.

According to Health Secretary Andy Burnham, "Jade's bravery and openness in her fight against cervical cancer has brought home to young women across the country the importance of regularly going for these checks." Gordon Brown stated, "Her family can be extremely proud of the work she has done to raise awareness of cervical cancer which will benefit thousands of women across the UK."

== Filmography ==
Year	Name	Role	Notes	Ref
2002	Big Brother 3	Contestant	4th place	
2002	What Jade Did Next	Presenter		
2002	Bo' Selecta!	Herself	1 episode	
2003	Celebrity Driving School	Herself		
2003	Wife Swap	Herself	1 episode	
2003	The Salon	Herself	1 episode	
2004	Back to Reality	Contestant	4th place	
2004	Big Brother Panto	Contestant		
2005	Jade's Salon	Presenter		
2005	Big Brother's Big Mouth	Guest Panelist	2 episodes	
2006	Just Jade	Herself		
2006	Weakest Link	Contestant	Celebrity edition; 1 episode	
2006	Eggheads	Contestant	Celebrity edition; 1 episode	
2006	Stars in Their Eyes	Contestant	Winner	
2006	The Friday Night Project	Guest Presenter	2 episodes	
2006	Jade's P.A	Herself		
2007	Celebrity Big Brother 5	Contestant	Evicted, Day 17	
2007	You Can't Fire Me, I'm Famous	Herself		
2008	Living with... Jade	Herself		
2008	Bigg Boss 2	Contestant	Walked, Day 2	
2008	Jade's Progress	Herself		
2009	Jade: Bride to Be	Herself	Highlights from her wedding	
2009	Jade's Wedding	Herself	Highlights from her wedding	
2009	Jade: With Love	Subject	Tribute show (archive footage)	
2009	Jade: As Seen on TV	Subject	Tribute show (archive footage)	
2010	Jade: A Year Without Her	Subject	Tribute show (archive footage)	
2010	Ultimate Big Brother: The Final	Subject	15-minute tribute (archive footage)	
2011	Jade Changed My Life	Subject	Tribute show (archive footage)	
2012	Jade Goody Saved My Life	Subject	Tribute show (archive footage)	
2019	Jade: The Reality Star Who Changed Britain	Subject	Tribute show (archive footage)	

=== Fitness DVDs ===
- Jade's All New Diet (with Steve Kemsley, 2003)
- Jade (with Steve Kemsley, 2004)
- Jade's Workout/Workout with Helen – The "Girls" from Big Brother (with Helen Adams, 2004)
- The Big Brother Collection: Jade's Dance Workout, Dance Workout with Helen Adams and Latino Dance Workout with Nadia (2005)
- Jade's Shape Challenge (2006)

== Books ==
- Jade: My Autobiography
