= Celebrity Extra =

- Starring: Tania Bryer, Liz Bonnin, Brian Dowling
- Country of origin: United Kingdom

Production
- Running time: 30 minutes

Original release
- Network: Living TV
- Release: 2002 – 2005

Celebrity Extra is a British celebrity entertainment series on Living TV. It is presented by Tania Bryer, followed by Liz Bonnin after a major revamp. Occasionally, Brian Dowling also hosted. It features a mixture of star interviews and reviews.
