= Border Security: Canada's Front Line =

- Title card
- Narrated by: Jeff Cole, Grant Bowler (for Australian and New Zealand Viewers)
- Opening theme: "Would I Lie To You?"; Performed by Eurythmics
- Country of origin: Canada
- Original language: English
- No. of seasons: 3
- No. of episodes: 65

Production
- Running time: Approx 30 minutes (including commercials)
- Production company: Force Four Entertainment

Original release
- Network: National Geographic Channel
- Release: September 6, 2012 – November 28, 2014

Related
- Border Security: Australia's Front Line; Homeland Security USA; Border Security New Zealand; UK Border Force; Customs

Border Security: Canada's Front Line is a Canadian reality television series that aired from 2012 to 2014. The series, produced by Force Four Entertainment for National Geographic Channel Canada, is a Canadian adaptation of the Australian reality series Border Security: Australia's Front Line and depicted the work of Canada Border Services Agency officers at airports, land crossings, and international mail centres.

The CBSA described the show as an educational tool to educate audiences about its duties and activities, but the series was controversial during its airing. Critics of the show claimed it was exploitative to film people in vulnerable situations, and that persons being detained by immigration officers could not properly give informed consent to being filmed. Border Security was ultimately cancelled following a ruling by the Privacy Commissioner of Canada that the CBSA had breached the privacy rights of a Mexican construction worker by allowing his interrogation to be filmed.

== Broadcast ==
Season 1 premiered in Canada on Thursday, September 6, 2012 and season 2 premiered on August 27, 2013. New episodes in seasons 1 and 2 aired on National Geographic Channel, with reruns airing on Global and DTour. Season 3 premiered on September 5, 2014, at 10 pm. On October 31, 2014, National Geographic announced that Season 3 will be the show's last.

Episodes also air on DMAX in Italy as Airport Security Canada, Seven Network in Australia as Border Security: International with narration by Eden Falk, ProSieben Maxx in Germany as Border Patrol Canada, Discovery MAX in Spain as Control de Aduanas Canadá Universo (TV channel) in the United States and on Sky Mix in the UK.

== Controversy ==
The show was criticized after filming a March 2013 immigration raid where eight workers were arrested. Criticisms included the lack of informed consent for those filmed and that the filming constituted an invasion of privacy. Also at issue was the government's involvement in the show as then-Minister of Public Safety Vic Toews had approved filming.

Some defended the show for realistically portraying many of the agency's mandates, including deterrence for undocumented immigrants while at the same time displaying the ongoing professionalism of the CBSA officers. The situation was discussed in Parliament during an exchange between the NDP Public Safety Critic, Randall Garrison, and Vic Toews, where Toews defended the show.

A campaign to cancel the show was started: a group of 175 artists and a group of 92 community organizations each published open letters denouncing the show, an online petition calling for the show to be cancelled received over 20,000 signatures, and the BC Civil Liberties Association filed a complaint with the Canadian Privacy Commissioner.

As a result of the controversy, the show's producers chose to not air the footage that had drawn criticism, the Canada Border Services Agency (CBSA) updated the sign indicating that filming was occurring to better describe how consent for filming is obtained and the CBSA limited filming sites. The procedure for obtaining informed consent from participants has also been clarified. Although Luc Portelance, president of the CBSA, recommended in October 2013 that the show should be cancelled, the show was renewed for a third season by Public Safety Minister Steven Blaney.

Mexican national Oscar Mata Duran, who was arrested in the raid, filed a complaint with the Canadian Privacy Commissioner after being filmed by the series and presented with a filming consent form. The Canadian Privacy Commissioner found that the CBSA breached the Privacy Act by filming Duran before he was advised of the purposes of filming and found that the coercive nature of being held in a detention facility would have prevented Duran from providing informed consent for his appearance.

The Privacy Commissioner ruling prompted the CBSA to end its participation in the series at the end of Season 3. CBSA spokesperson Esme Bailey announced the series would not return for a fourth season. Because it can easily be partitioned off to fill a short-notice time slot due to its short-length segments, repeats of the series continue to air across Corus Entertainment networks, mainly as a filler program meeting Canadian content regulations.

== Locations ==
Most of the episodes in seasons 1 and 2 were filmed at Vancouver International Airport, the land crossings at BC 99 (Peace Arch) and BC 15 (Pacific Highway), and marine points of entry in British Columbia. Portions of season 2 were also filmed at Toronto Pearson International Airport and the Peace Bridge (QEW). In Season 3, the number of locations expanded with the inclusion Montréal–Pierre Elliott Trudeau International Airport and of land checkpoints in Alberta.

Following a ruling by the Privacy Commissioner of Canada, the CBSA stopped allowing Force Four to film the series in Canada. Season 4 focused on American border security, namely the U.S. Customs and Border Protection agency.

== Episodes ==
Episodes typically have five or more segments; the first two to appear are described here to allow identification of the episodes

Number	Date	Segment 1	Segment 2
1	2012	Vancouver International Airport: An Australian man has two bottles of liquor and a DUI record	Vancouver International Airport: Detector dog Whisky identifies three suspicious suitcases from China
2	2012	Vancouver International Airport: A Dutch woman plans a 4-night stay to visit her boyfriend but has a massive amount of luggage	Vancouver International Airport: A traveler has three envelopes of cash
3	2012	Vancouver International Airport: A UK man is suspected of coming to Canada to work illegally	Vancouver International Airport: A Chinese businessman is belligerent about being examined
4	2012	Douglas: CBSA is suspicious of two men who switched seats while in line for primary inspection	Vancouver International Airport: A UK traveler is under suspicion because of an expired work permit
5	2012	Vancouver International Airport: An American snowboarder arrives drunk	Vancouver Mail Centre: A package bound for BC might be a gun barrel
6	2012	Vancouver International Airport: A Canadian man returning from years in Japan is belligerent	Douglas: A family from California in a rental car is suspected of carrying drugs
7	2012	Vancouver International Airport: A Korean woman is traveling with her Canadian fiancé	Port Metro Vancouver: The wife of a ship's officer lacks a visa to enter Canada
8	2012	Vancouver International Airport: Detector dog Nova is suspicious of an unclaimed bag.	Vancouver International Airport: Detector dog Nova checks out a Canadian man going to Las Vegas to get married.
9	2012	Vancouver International Airport: Outbound travelers are being checked for currency; A man going to Ecuador has a record for theft	Vancouver Mail Centre: A package declared as baby formula looks suspicious
10	2012	Vancouver International Airport: A Russian man en route to USA plans to sightsee in Vancouver	Vancouver International Airport: A Korean man claims to be going to Winnipeg for sightseeing
11	2012	Vancouver International Airport: An American IT consultant plans to travel to Toronto to visit a girlfriend	Douglas: An ailing American man seeks help from the Slovak consulate
12	2012	Sidney Harbour: An Alaska-bound American vessel has weapons and wine	Victoria International Airport: A Canadian couple return from a music festival in California
13	2012	Inland Enforcement Team: The hunt is on for two Central American drug runners	Vancouver International Airport: A Greek man claims to be making a last-minute vacation to Canada
15	2013	Vancouver International Airport: American man returning from a long stay in the Philippines wants to stay 264 days in Canada	Pacific Highway: An American man bound to Vancouver by bus has a criminal record
16	2013	Toronto Pearson International Airport: A man returning from India & Sri Lanka arouses suspicions by claiming his bag isn't his	Vancouver International Airport: A California man is traveling with a large quantity of professional photo equipment
17	2013	Vancouver International Airport: Chinese man quits his job before a vacation in Canada but has IT books with him	Douglas: American man going to Whistler has DUI conviction
18	2013	Vancouver International Airport: Canadian man returning from a 4-month tour of Americas has a baby doll leg	Douglas: American woman lacks proper ID and has a suspicious California car
19	2013	Vancouver International Airport: An Australian snowboarder has undeclared brass knuckles	Douglas: A group of U.S. musicians headed to Vancouver reek of marijuana
20	2013	Pacific Highway: An American soldier has driven a long way for a short visit	Vancouver International Airport: A British woman brings many suspicious items for a two-month visit
21	2013	Vancouver International Airport: A man arriving from Beijing is looking to cash a $10,000 cheque	Douglas: An American man comes to snowboard but has DUI issues
22	2013	Vancouver International Airport: A Canadian man returns from a backpacking trip of Central America	Vancouver International Airport: A group of American rappers arrive for shows but some members have criminal records
23	2013	Douglas: Two lost Canadians made a wrong turn into USA; one has a criminal record	Toronto Mail centre: A package from Trinidad & Tobago is declared to be African art
24	2013	Vancouver International Airport: An L.A. man claims to be sightseeing and visiting a distant cousin	Pacific Highway: A woman from Utah plans to visit a friend for a few hours
25	2013	Toronto Pearson International Airport: A Canadian man returning from Cuba tests positive for cocaine	Toronto Mail Centre: An infrared lamp coming from Germany seems to have organic matter inside
26	2013	Toronto Pearson International Airport: Currency dog Jagger sniffs out a Canadian man returning from China	Vancouver air cargo facility: A box from Asia marked paint brushes appears to contain none; instead they are markers. But are they really?
27	2013	Douglas: An American man with a visitor record seeks to have his extended so he can transit to Alaska	Vancouver air cargo facility: A package declared as a book has a hidden insert
28	2013	Toronto Pearson International Airport: A Canadian woman returning from Jamaica is suspected of smuggling cocaine when she presents a fake funeral program	Abbotsford-Huntington: American man traveling to Alaska with elderly parents and four large dogs in a large RV trailer is suspected of smuggling guns
29	2013	Vancouver International Airport: Slovak man is back soon after a 14-month stay in Canada	Toronto Pearson International Airport: Canadian returning from China with an elderly relative is found with dried worms
31	2013	Douglas: Moldovan man needs to renew expired work permit	Pender Island: CBSA inspects commercial fishing boat headed for Alaska
32	2013	Peace Bridge: Group of engineering grad students appears suspicious	Vancouver International Airport: Croatian man makes a last-minute trip to Canada
33	2013	Vancouver air cargo facility: Two packages from India declared as clothing appear to be something else	Pacific Highway: A California teen is heading for a mountain bike event in Whistler
34	2013	Pender Island: CBSA officers inspect an American fishing boat for firearms	Peace Bridge: A trucker from Alabama is being questioned about an unsealed load
35	2013	Abbotsford-Huntington: An underemployed couple in a high-value vehicle have photos of grow operations on a phone	Vancouver International Airport: A British man claims he's visiting to reconcile with his husband
36	2013	Vancouver International Airport: A Mexican man is extremely nervous	Port Metro Vancouver: The mobile x-ray unit inspects shipping containers from China
37	2013	Vancouver International Airport: A tattooer from Philadelphia is coming to meet a friend	Toronto International Mail Centre: A package from India declared as homemade snacks seems to be too heavy and contains odd shapes
38	2013	Douglas: An American man claims to have entered Canada by mistake while driving around Seattle	Vancouver Mail Centre: Agents are suspicious of a package that doesn't feel natural
39	2013	Vancouver International Airport: An American repairman formerly denied entry to Canada claims to be up on a job	Pacific Highway: Two Americans in a borrowed truck are going to visit a friend in Richmond
41	2014	Douglas: A Texas couple has undeclared weapons	Toronto Pearson International Airport: A Canadian man returning from Jamaica has an anomalous bag
42	2014	Montreal Trudeau International Airport: A man from Lebanon has been away for almost a year	Vancouver International Airport: A Canadian man returns from another of his frequent trips to Asia
43	2014	Toronto Pearson International Airport: UK man going to South America tries to avoid CBSA	Montreal Trudeau International Airport: Lebanese man has previously been caught with undeclared cash
44		Pacific Highway: Two skateboarders, one American, one Canadian, are referred to secondary inspection	Toronto Pearson International Airport: Two Canadians returning from China are suspected of exceeding their declaration
45		Vancouver air cargo facility: cargo inspectors examine four crates from Asia	Montreal Trudeau International Airport: A Canadian man returning from India doesn't know what's in his suitcase
46		Port Metro Vancouver: Marine Team Zulu inspects a freighter from Brazil	Toronto Peason International Airport: Canadian man returns from a month in China has too many cigarettes and lard
48	2014	Vancouver International Airport: A Hungarian man is suspected of looking for work in Canada	Coutts: CBSA checks the serial numbers of a shipment of guns coming into Canada
5045	2014	Toronto Pearson International Airport: A Canadian man returns with little luggage after six weeks in Africa	Aldergrove: A hunter from Washington is towing a boat on a Canadian trailer
5053	2014	Coutts: A Canadian man has livestock bound for Saskatoon	Toronto Pearson International Airport: A man from the Bahamas appears for inspection with a pro-marijuana T-shirt
5054	2014	Toronto Pearson International Airport: Currency dog Jagger sniffs out a Canadian man returning from Egypt	Pacific Highway: An American man claims to be buying a collectible camper in Vancouver
5055	2014	Douglas: A Canadian woman is back from a 6-hour shopping trip to Washington	Toronto Pearson International Airport: A dog accuses a Canadian man coming from Belarus of having undeclared agricultural products.
5056	2014	Toronto Pearson International Airport: A Canadian man returning from two months in China declares only $40 in merchandise	Coutts: A group returns from a rave in Nevada
5057	2014	Osoyoos: An American teacher on a fishing trip has a record for assaulting a police officer	Peace Bridge: Twin brothers who accidentally crossed the border are found with open beer
5058	2014	Montreal Trudeau International Airport: Detector dog Hunter discovers a couple from France has undeclared liquor	Pacific Highway: An American refrigerated truck loaded with strawberries is checked for false compartments
5059	2014	Vancouver International Airport: A Mexican woman is overly friendly and in no rush to claim her bag	Ambassador Bridge: An American man declares a long gun
5060	2015	Vancouver International Airport: A woman transiting Canada is caught with marijuana in her bra	Toronto Pearson International Airport: A Canadian woman returning from China seems unaware of how much money she's carrying
5061	2015	Port Metro Vancouver: CBSA officers inspect a suspicious shipping container bound for Asia	Montreal Trudeau International Airport: A Tunisian national returns from a visit to family but declares nothing
5062	2015	Vancouver International Airport: Canadian woman returns from a trip to US which was paid for by a lover of hers	Toronto Pearson International Airport: A Canadian woman makes a $500 declaration
5063	2015	Toronto Pearson International Airport: An Iranian student has undeclared cigarettes	Toronto air cargo facility: A pair of crates from China are inspected to determine their age and historic significance
5064	2015	Halifax Stanfield International Airport: Detector dog Roscoe finds a package	Abbotsford-Huntington: Middle-aged couple meeting in person for the first time going to Alaska via Prince Rupert
5067	2014	Vancouver International Airport: Canadian man returning from Hong Kong has $9000 in cash and packages of duck	Montreal Trudeau International Airport: An American man comes to install a trampoline for a Canadian buyer
5068	2015	Toronto Pearson International Airport: CBSA conducts an airside inspection of a flight from Trinidad	Montreal Trudeau International Airport: Australian man coming from Vegas tries to bypass immigration
5069	2015	Lunenburg: CBSA inspects a vehicle coming from St-Pierre et Miquelon that didn't report in Fortune, Newf.	Toronto Pearson International Airport: CBSA inspects two cases bound for northern Africa
5071	2015	Vancouver International Airport: Detector dog Ashton flags two suspicious unclaimed bags.	Douglas: A couple headed to Vancouver for a Katy Perry concert has a concealed weapon permit.
5072	2015	Toronto Pearson International Airport: Canadian man returning from Jamaica is angry to be asked if he knows another black man	Pender Island: CBSA boards American pleasure craft to check their stock of alcohol
unk		Douglas: Canadian man returns after losing money at a Washington Indian casino	Toronto Pearson International Airport: Outbound passenger's jacket contains concealed tubes that turn out to be live birds
