= Brian Dowling (presenter) =

Irish television presenter

- Born: Brian Patrick Robert Dowling; 13 June 1978 (age 48); Rathangan, County Kildare, Ireland
- Occupation: Television/ radio presenter
- Years active: 2001–present
- Television: Big Brother
- Spouse: Arthur Gourounlian (m. 2015)
- Children: 2

Brian Patrick Robert Dowling (born 13 June 1978) is an Irish television and radio presenter. He rose to fame after winning the second series of reality series Big Brother and went on to win Ultimate Big Brother in 2010. In 2007, he came third in Hell's Kitchen and in 2008, he was runner-up in the Irish reality television series Fáilte Towers. Dowling then guest-presented Live from Studio Five alongside Kate Walsh from 2010 until its cancellation in February 2011.

On 22 July 2011, it was confirmed that Dowling would become the new host of Big Brother upon its transfer to Channel 5, replacing Davina McCall. After Dowling had presented two editions of Big Brother and four editions of Celebrity Big Brother, Channel 5 confirmed in April 2013 that he was to be replaced by Emma Willis.

== Early life ==
Dowling was born on 13 June 1978, in Rathangan, County Kildare, Ireland. Before he entered the public eye, he trained as a holiday rep and air steward, working as a flight attendant for Ryanair. He came out as gay to his parents two days before appearing in Big Brother in 2001.

== Big Brother ==
Dowling was the winner of series 2 of Big Brother, beating Helen Adams in the final and polling 4,231,660 votes (58%) out of a total 7,255,094. In 2010, Brian returned to compete in the final Big Brother on Channel 4 and he became the Ultimate Big Brother Housemate. Brian spent a total of 82 days in the Big Brother house, 64 for his original stay and later 18 days for Ultimate Big Brother.

== Media career ==
Dowling followed Big Brother by presenting SMTV Live, becoming the first openly gay children's television presenter. He also presented his own show on ITV, Brian's Boyfriends, as well as narrating the Channel 4 reality series The Salon.

In 2002, Brian co-hosted the Elle Style Awards with BBC Radio 1 presenter Jo Whiley. In 2003, he joined Duncan James and Tara Palmer-Tomkinson in presenting the NOW Magazine Style Awards, where he also won the award for Most Stylish UK Personality.

Dowling regularly stood in for Liz Bonnin on LivingTV's Celebrity Extra show in 2004. He has also voiced numerous adverts and TV series and has presented the companion show to I'm Famous and Frightened!

In July 2005, Dowling fronted the Party in the Park concert in Leeds with Coronation Street's Nikki Sanderson. He then went on to front the Irish O2 in the Park concert, in Phoenix Park, Dublin, alongside Fran Cosgrave and Caroline Morahan in August 2005.

Dowling also hosted a showbiz slot on Vernon Kay's BBC Radio 1 Saturday morning show from October 2004 to September 2006.

In October 2005, Dowling presented a series of special Christmas features as part of Sky Digital's interactive platform programming, titled Christmas Wrapped Up, in which he reviewed and helped to promote products that were available for purchase in the shopping areas of Sky Digital's Sky Active service.

Dowling was reintroduced as a presenter on ITV in March 2006 when the network launched its ITV Play subsidiary. Along with six others, Dowling was signed up as a presenter of the network's interactive gamble based telephone show The Mint. The game show ran until 2007.

In October 2007, Dowling and his family appeared on All Star Family Fortunes, where they won £4,660 for charity.

Dowling was a contestant in the ITV reality series Hell's Kitchen during September 2007, where he finished in third place. Following on from this, in August 2008, Dowling was a contestant in the Irish reality television show, Fáilte Towers, where he and 12 other celebrities had to take on the roles of hotel staff. He came second to John Creedon. He then went on to become a contestant on TV3's Celebrity Salon, in which he and several other Irish celebrities (Pippa O'Connor, Leigh Arnold, Virginia Macari, Celia Holman Lee and Breffny Morgan) learn the tools of the beauty trade. Celebrity Salon began airing on in June 2010. Tasks included giving facials, waxing, performing cosmetic surgery, hairdressing and styling.

He also appeared in a special episode of Come Dine with Me, alongside three other previous winners of Big Brother and was declared the winner. Dowling was crowned Ultimate Big Brother housemate on 10 September 2010, at the end of the Ultimate Big Brother series that saw the end of Big Brother's transmission on Channel 4. Following this he has appeared as co-host alongside Katherine Lynch on the RTÉ2 series Wagons Den.

On 22 July 2011, after months of speculation, it was confirmed that Dowling would become the new presenter of the revived series of Big Brother on Channel 5. He presented four celebrity series in August/September 2011, January 2012, August/September 2012 and January 2013, and two series of the main show in 2011 and 2012. He was replaced as presenter of Big Brother by Emma Willis for Series 14, which started in June 2013.

Dowling has also had numerous appearances on This Morning, presenting segments on the show.

In 2014, Dowling presented the TV3 game show Sitting on a Fortune in Ireland.

Dowling has hosted The Real Housewives of Cheshire's reunion specials since the series' premiere in 2015.

In 2020, Dowling participated in the fourth series of the Irish edition of Dancing with the Stars. Dowling was paired with Laura Nolan. On 6 February 2020, Dowling and Kai Widdrington were announced by RTÉ as the first male same-sex dance partners on the show during switch-up week. Dowling was eliminated from the competition in the first dance-off of the series on 16 February 2020.

In March 2023, Dowling joined 98fm presenting a weekday morning show alongside Suzanne Kane, in November 2023, it was announced that Dowling and Katja Mia would be the new presenters of The 6 O'Clock Show on Virgin Media Television.

Also in 2023, Dowling and Gourounlian featured in a documentary titled Brian and Arthur's Very Modern Family and released a book titled Brian and Arthur's Modern Family: Births, Marriages, Deaths and Everything.

== Theatre ==
Dowling has appeared in popular Irish Christmas pantomimes, at Dublin's Tivoli Theatre. In December 2008 – January 2009, he starred as the evil Captain Hook in Anthem Productions' presentation of Peter Pan. Since then, Dowling has had the new character "Bridie" created for him, appearing in 2009's Cinderella and 2010's Beauty and the Beast.

== Television ==
Year	Programme	Role
2001	Big Brother	Contestant (winner)
2001–2003	SMTV Live	Presenter
2003	Brian's Boyfriends	Presenter
2004	The Salon	Narrator
2004–2005	I'm Famous and Frightened!	Presenter
2005	Celebrity Extra	Presenter
2005	Christmas Wrapped Up	Presenter
2006–2007	The Mint	Presenter
2007	Hell's Kitchen	Contestant
2007	Cirque de Celebrité	Presenter
2007	All Star Family Fortunes	Contestant (winner)
2008	Fáilte Towers	Contestant
2008	Come Dine with Me	Contestant (winner)
2010	Ultimate Big Brother	Contestant (winner)
2010	Wagons Den	Presenter
2011	National Television Awards Awards Party 2011	Presenter
2011	Live from Studio Five	Presenter
2011–2013	Big Brother	Presenter
2011–2013	Celebrity Big Brother	Presenter
2011–2013	Big Brother's Bit on the Side	Panelist and Relief Presenter
2011–2013	Celebrity Big Brother's Bit on the Side	Panelist and Relief Presenter
2014–?	Sitting on a Fortune	Presenter
2016–present	The Real Housewives of Cheshire	Narrator and presenter
2020	Dancing with the Stars	Contestant (8th place)
2021–present	The Real Housewives of Jersey	Narrator and presenter
