= Just Jade =

- Directed by: Jill Worsley
- Starring: Jade Goody; Tim Pigott-Smith
- Country of origin: United Kingdom
- No. of series: 1
- No. of episodes: 8

Production
- Producer: Kate Jackson
- Production location: United Kingdom
- Editors: James Harrod; Matthew Pratt
- Running time: 60 mins
- Production company: Granada Television

Original release
- Network: Living
- Release: 29 May – 17 July 2006

Related
- Jade's Shape Challenge (2006); Jade: A Year Without Her

Just Jade is a 2006 reality television show featuring Jade Goody. It was an eight-part series following Goody in her bid to launch her own perfume range. Living re-ran the series all weekend following the death of Goody on 22 March 2009.

== Episode list ==
=== Episode 1 ===
Jade considers different ways to expand her brand and decides to make her own perfume brand.

=== Episode 2 ===
Jade continues making her perfume, jade celebrates Valentine's Day with her new lover Jack tweed.

=== Episode 3 ===
Jade embarks on a shopping trip to Venice, and begins creating designs for her new perfume bottle and packaging.

=== Episode 4 ===
After looking into marketing methods for her perfume, Jade goes house-hunting for a property in Dubai.

=== Episode 5 ===
Jade has to make a very important decision about what her perfume will smell like, and she throws an Ann Summers party for her friends.

=== Episode 6 ===
Jade goes riding with a new acquaintance, and encounters some issues with a staff member.

=== Episode 7 ===
Jade hits the road to promote her autobiography, and her 25th birthday is marked by a party.

=== Episode 8 ===
Jade has agreed on the design for her perfume and has even sold it to the retailer. However, with only five days to go before the launch of Jade's new product, perfume guru Bob has to get 12,000 bottles ready in time.
