= Border Security: Australia's Front Line =

Australian television series

- Also known as: Nothing to Declare, Seguridad de Frontera: Australia, Douanes sous Haute Surveillance
- Genre: Factual
- Narrated by: Grant Bowler
- Composer: Neil Sutherland
- Country of origin: Australia
- Original language: English
- No. of seasons: 17
- No. of episodes: 238

Production
- Executive producer: Lyndal Marks
- Production location: Australia
- Running time: Approx 30 minutes (including commercials)
- Production company: Seven Studios

Original release
- Network: Seven Network
- Release: 13 October 2004 – present

Related
- Border Security: Canada's Front Line; Homeland Security USA; Border Security New Zealand; UK Border Force; Customs

Border Security: Australia's Front Line (known as Nothing to Declare in the UK and Ireland) is an Australian factual television programme in the form of an observational documentary that airs on the Seven Network. The show follows the work of officers of the Department of Home Affairs, Australian Border Force, and biosecurity officers as they enforce Australian immigration, customs, quarantine and finance laws. All three of these government agencies cooperate with filming. Officers from the Australian Fisheries Management Authority and personnel from the Australian Defence Force have also appeared on the show.

Most of the programme is filmed at Sydney, Melbourne and Brisbane airports; scenes from the Sydney international mail arrival facility are also shown. Occasionally, the programme features other locations such as Perth Airport and Adelaide Airport, seaports, international mail centres, raids on workplaces suspected of employing persons contrary to the restrictions of their visa or immigrant status and the work of Australian Border Force vessels and aircraft in the waters of Northern Australia.

The series has so far produced 17 series as of 2024.

In July 2024, the Department of Agriculture, Fisheries and Forestry announced filming of series 17 had been completed with episodes airing in the next 12 months.

== Broadcast ==
The show premiered in Australia in 2004 and became a ratings hit. The first series was hosted by Grant Bowler, who stopped appearing on camera in subsequent series; however Bowler continues to provide the voiceover for every episode. It is classified PG. The series also airs on the Australian pay TV channel Lifestyle and overseas on the ABC Australia.

The show is also broadcast internationally. In New Zealand, it airs on TVNZ's TV1, as well as eden. When LivingTV (now Sky Witness acquired broadcast rights to Border Security: Australia's Front Line in the UK from the programme's distributor Cineflix International the distribution arm of Canadian production company Cineflix on 7 June 2005 for Living's Autumn transmission, the series was retitled as Nothing to Declare in both the UK and Ireland as British government agency UK Border Force was using the "Border Security" in that region and to avoid confusion with the UK's own border service & trademark conflicts, in the United States, the series was named Seguridad de frontera: Australia) for the Spanish television network NBC Universo.

It airs on Tele 5 in Poland (in Polish), on vtm in Belgium and on Veronica in the Netherlands. Kanal 9 airs the series in Sweden, on Jim in Finland, on the TV 2 channel in Denmark, on Prosieben Maxx and Nitro in Germany dubbed into German; and also in Italy on DMAX dubbed into Italian, where it is broadcast as Airport Security, and in France on CStar, dubbed into French and broadcast as Douanes sous haute surveillance. It is broadcast as Grensevakten in Norway on TVNorge. In Spain, it is aired on DMAX (as “Control de Aduanas”).

Border Security also airs across Asia in countries such as Hong Kong, Malaysia, South Korea, Thailand and Macau. In Singapore it airs on Fox Crime. In Canada, the series airs on BBC Canada and DTour.

== Criticism ==
Writer Bob Burton in his book Inside Spin: The Dark Underbelly of the PR Industry expressed concern that the television show, by being subject to post-production editing, allows the producers to remove anything that shows any mistakes made by the government agencies concerned. Instead, Burton argues, the show gives the viewing public the sense that the government is effectively and fairly administering border security policy.

In 2009 Media Watch suggested that the Department of Immigration and Citizenship used its working relationship with Seven as leverage for an apology to its National Communications Manager, Sandi Logan, who had appeared in an unflattering light on a Today Tonight report. Media Watch's sources claimed that persons in the Department threatened to cease co-operation with Seven in the production of future Border Security episodes.

== Episodes ==
=== Season 1 (2004) ===
No. overall	No. in season	Title	Original release date	Viewers (millions)
1	1	"Episode 1"	13 October 2004	N/A
Officers question an Italian man's nationality. Swab tests cause issues for a man at Customs, and a couple arriving from New York are facing penalties after being discovered with undeclared food.
2	2	"Episode 2"	20 October 2004	N/A
A positive test result for cocaine on a passenger leads to a formal interview, a Federal Police investigation and a trip to the local hospital.
3	3	"Episode 3"	27 October 2004	N/A
An American passenger arouses suspicions due to a lack of funds. Follow Customs as they protect Australia's national parks. A woman from the United Kingdom faces removal from Australia.
4	4	"Episode 4"	3 November 2004	N/A
A holidaymaker carrying Lord of the Rings statues and a couple carrying hidden weapons are investigated. An elderly man is deported when he is caught using a false passport.
5	5	"Episode 5"	10 November 2004	N/A
A passenger is detained by Customs after his travel movements and lack of luggage cause suspicions. Suspected drug traffickers have their luggage examined.
6	6	"Episode 6"	17 November 2004	N/A
A Japanese traveller arouses suspicions after arriving in Australia shortly after purchasing his ticket. A South African passenger is questioned by Immigration, and a suitcase full of suspected weapons delays the border clearance of another passenger at Customs.
7	7	"Episode 7"	24 November 2004	N/A
A South African passenger continues to be questioned about their visa status. Immigration officers commence an operation in western Sydney, where an illegal worker is detained.
8	8	"Episode 8"	1 December 2004	N/A
Cans of soup are examined in the Customs mail facility. A Korean woman is questioned by Immigration. Customs protect Australian's fishing industry.
9	9	"Episode 9"	8 December 2004	N/A
A Chinese passenger with an excellent credit rating is unable to quash immigration concerns about his identity. Both a Ferrari and cans of soup cause concern for officers.
10	10	"Episode 10"	15 December 2004	N/A
Customs is on alert after the American authorities inform them of a suspicious traveller. The Chinese passenger's secret identity is uncovered.

=== Season 2 (2005) ===
No. overall	No. in season	Title	Original release date	Viewers (millions)
11	1	"Episode 1"	10 February 2005	N/A
A disgruntled passenger causes disruptions at Immigration when he refuses to join a queue for passport checks. An American is facing cancellation of their visa after erring in their application, and Customs officers search a passenger arriving on a flight from Buenos Aires.
12	2	"Episode 2"	17 February 2005	N/A
A previous warning for smuggling food into Australia without declaring it on their arrival card has failed to work on a Chinese passenger who once again is caught up by Quarantine officers. A passenger who spent time teaching English in Japan lands to a cold reception from Customs officers after failing to declare a large amount of cash.
13	3	"Episode 3"	24 February 2005	N/A
Customs are concerned with a passenger after finding cash concealed in his suitcase, and another traveller cannot find their passport.
14	4	"Episode 4"	3 March 2005	N/A
A Hong Kong arrival is closely monitored on suspicion of carrying drugs. A passenger caught with weapons may fall on their sword. Immigration officers are concerns about the intentions of a passenger arrived from Malaysia.
15	5	"Episode 5"	10 March 2005	N/A
Quarantine officers investigate a concealment revealing prohibited goods. Immigration run an operation in Sydney to detect illegal workers in the passenger transportation industry.
16	6	"Episode 6"	17 March 2005	N/A
An American passenger off a flight from the United States is questioned by immigration, meanwhile Customs are investigating the luggage of passengers from Korea and South America.
17	7	"Episode 7"	24 March 2005	N/A
Two passengers arriving on a flight from Vietnam attract suspicion after intentionally separating at the border. Follow Customs officials as they show viewers the destruction process for goods confiscated at the border. Quarantine finds undeclared food in the luggage of a Burmese arrival.
18	8	"Episode 8"	31 March 2005	N/A
Cuban newly weds face confiscation of gifts due to quarantine risk and unpaid duties. Customs suspect they may be hiding prohibited items.
19	9	"Episode 9"	7 April 2005	N/A
Customs interview a suspect arrival.
20	10	"Episode 10"	14 April 2005	N/A
Smuggled flowers are detected by Quarantine and questioning by Immigration reveals an identity crisis for one passenger.
21	11	"Episode 11"	21 April 2005	N/A
Customs search for undeclared Tobacco importations leading to a major investigation into this budding trend. A passenger is facing difficulties after his luggage tests positive to cocaine.

=== Season 3 (2006) ===
No. overall	No. in season	Title	Original release date	Viewers (millions)
22	1	"Episode 1"	16 May 2006	N/A
Customs officers at the international mail facility in Sydney are on alert after a chess set arrives from India.
23	2	"Episode 2"	23 May 2006	N/A
Will a cup of coffee be the start of a good, or very bad day for a passenger arriving with nothing to declare at Quarantine?
24	3	"Episode 3"	30 May 2006	N/A
A man faces difficulty after arriving without a passport. Meanwhile, Customs officers investigate suspicious mail.
25	4	"Episode 4"	6 June 2006	N/A
Immigration officers pull a male passenger aside for interview when his movements suggest an intention to work in Australia illegally. An English passenger is questioned by Customs on suspicion he may be smuggling narcotics.
26	5	"Episode 5"	13 June 2006	N/A
A Filipino passenger catches the attention of Customs due to his intentions of a short holiday.
27	6	"Episode 6"	20 June 2006	N/A
A New Zealand man with an undeclared criminal past is questioned by Immigration. Customs eye the arrivals hall for suspect passengers.
28	7	"Episode 7"	27 June 2006	N/A
Customs scan the arrivals hall and two passengers from Vietnam catch their attention.
29	8	"Episode 8"	4 July 2006	N/A
Quarantine fight to keep pests and diseases out of Australia, and Customs are protecting Australia's border.
30	9	"Episode 9"	11 July 2006	N/A
A German man is questioned about his luggage. Immigration question two passengers from Portugal.
31	10	"Episode 10"	18 July 2006	N/A
Thousands of arrivals lead Customs to be on high alert as suspicious passengers mix with the peak rush.
32	11	"Episode 11"	25 July 2006	N/A
A man arriving from Sudan is detained for an extensive luggage search after suspect behaviour in the arrivals hall.
33	12	"Episode 12"	1 August 2006	N/A
Customs are on the lookout for contraband.
34	13	"Episode 13"	8 August 2006	N/A
35	14	"Episode 14"	15 August 2006	N/A
36	15	"Episode 15"	22 August 2006	N/A
37	16	"Episode 16"	29 August 2006	N/A
38	17	"Episode 17"	5 September 2006	N/A
39	18	"Episode 18"	12 September 2006	N/A
40	19	"Episode 19"	19 September 2006	N/A

=== Season 4 (2006–2007) ===
No. overall	No. in season	Title	Original release date	Viewers (millions)
41	1	"Episode 1"	2 November 2006	N/A
42	2	"Episode 2"	9 November 2006	N/A
43	3	"Episode 3"	16 November 2006	N/A
44	4	"Episode 4"	23 November 2006	N/A
45	5	"Episode 5"	7 February 2007	N/A
46	6	"Episode 6"	14 February 2007	N/A
47	7	"Episode 7"	21 February 2007	N/A
48	8	"Episode 8"	28 February 2007	N/A
49	9	"Episode 9"	7 March 2007	N/A
50	10	"Episode 10"	14 March 2007	N/A

=== Season 5 (2007) ===
No. overall	No. in season	Title	Original release date	Viewers (millions)
51	1	"Episode 1"	2 July 2007	N/A
52	2	"Episode 2"	9 July 2007	N/A
53	3	"Episode 3"	16 July 2007	N/A
An Englishman attracts the attention of Customs, and a Malaysian cook attracts the attention of Immigration.
54	4	"Episode 4"	23 July 2007	N/A
55	5	"Episode 5"	30 July 2007	N/A
56	6	"Episode 6"	6 August 2007	N/A
57	7	"Episode 7"	13 August 2007	N/A
58	8	"Episode 8"	20 August 2007	N/A
59	9	"Episode 9"	27 August 2007	N/A
60	10	"Episode 10"	3 September 2007	N/A
61	11	"Episode 11"	10 September 2007	N/A
62	12	"Episode 12"	17 September 2007	N/A
63	13	"Episode 13"	24 September 2007	N/A
64	14	"Episode 14"	1 October 2007	N/A
65	15	"Episode 15"	8 October 2007	N/A
66	16	"Episode 16"	15 October 2007	N/A
67	17	"Episode 17"	22 October 2007	N/A
68	18	"Episode 18"	29 October 2007	N/A
69	19	"Episode 19"	5 November 2007	N/A
70	20	"Episode 20"	12 November 2007	N/A
71	21	"Episode 21"	19 November 2007	N/A
72	22	"Episode 22"	26 November 2007	N/A

=== Season 6 (2008) ===
No. overall	No. in season	Title	Original release date	Viewers (millions)
73	1	"Episode 1"	11 February 2008	N/A
Unusual travel movements cause Customs to question the motives of a new arrival. Immigration officers run a special operation focusing on ensuring compliance on visa working conditions in Sydney. Quarantine are unimpressed with the undeclared goods brought in by two Canadians.
74	2	"Episode 2"	18 February 2008	N/A
A Hong Kong banker is irate at being detained by Customs, meanwhile a New Zealand arrival makes her case to Immigration. Customs at the international mail arrival facility in Sydney examine a package from India.
75	3	"Episode 3"	25 February 2008	N/A
Customs hunt for drugs suspected to be carried by two Vietnamese passengers. A British passenger faces removal from Australia after arriving with a declared criminal record. Quarantine officers are stunned by the animal cruelty found in two packages from China.
76	4	"Episode 4"	3 March 2008	N/A
Officers patrol Australian waters north of Darwin for illegal activity.
77	5	"Episode 5"	10 March 2008	N/A
In Sydney, a random bag search of two passengers returning to Australia turns nasty. Customs fight to stop a multi-million dollar black market trade in sharks off the north-western coast of Australia. Quarantine discover a dangerous threat in the luggage of some passengers from Lebanon.
78	6	"Episode 6"	17 March 2008	N/A
When Customs find traces of narcotics on an American passenger's surfboard, the passenger pops some pills, becomes abusive and collapses. A stash of food in the bags of some Indonesian passengers holds a surprise for Customs. Customs officers find that 50 jars of pills in a package from India are not the natural remedies claimed on the jars.
79	7	"Episode 7"	24 March 2008	N/A
When a British passenger makes an astonishing admission, Customs officers become very interested in him. A hunt for a Chinese woman suspected of being in Australia illegally sparks an angry showdown with Immigration. A passenger returning from Iran is stopped at the border.
80	8	"Episode 8"	31 March 2008	N/A
A New Zealand passenger is not happy that he is separated from his wife and children after Immigration discover that he has a criminal history. An incredible situation in Customs could put a Vietnamese passenger's life in danger. Immigration compliance officers work with police and the Department of Transport in a crackdown targeting illegal taxi drivers in Sydney's southern suburbs.
81	9	"Episode 9"	7 April 2008	N/A
A Vietnamese passenger gets upset when Customs take a large interest in his few belongings. A mystery box from Peru sparks a Customs investigation. Immigration think that a Malaysian passenger's story doesn't add up.
82	10	"Episode 10"	14 April 2008	N/A
Immigration face a huge security concern with a German passenger. Two funny looking Vietnamese passengers carry something that is deadly serious. The discovery of two packages from South Africa triggers a raid on a black market smuggling ring.

=== Season 7 (2009) ===
No. overall	No. in season	Title	Original release date	Viewers (millions)
83	1	"Episode 1"	8 February 2009	N/A
A sweet-sounding French student is suspected by Customs to be concealing drugs. A Malaysian passenger is betrayed by his wife in Immigration. Customs search the contents of a couple of plastic bottles with something concealed in them.
84	2	"Episode 2"	15 February 2009	N/A
An Australian passenger returning from the Philippines tries a few moves on Customs. A Malaysian person doesn't let the truth get in the way of his story in Immigration. A woman from Hong Kong becomes very nervous when Customs officers discover suspicious documents.
85	3	"Episode 3"	22 February 2009	N/A
A drug swab could tell Customs a different story. Document experts find multiple cases of identity fraud .. have they uncovered a crime syndicate? And someone has gone through a lot of trouble for a box of cheap toys.
86	4	"Episode 4"	1 March 2009	N/A
A days traveller struggles to answer Customs' questions. Is he involved with an international drug running operation? A surprise dawn raid sends workers into hiding. And officers discover that the most innocent items can be the most dangerous.
87	5	"Episode 5"	8 March 2009	N/A
Immigration is not interested in emotional baggage, but this passenger's violent love life is raising alarms. A horrifying and potential deadly discovery has arrived in the mail. And finally, we discover the truth behind this day's traveller.
88	6	"Episode 6"	15 March 2009	N/A
A high-flying socialite with royal connections has a lot of explaining to do. A police report triggers a disturbing confession. An athlete with nowhere to run.
89	7	"Episode 7"	22 March 2009	N/A
A professional wrestler faces an unexpected opponent. Customs are stunned when they see what a Frenchman is really up to. And a bag inspection turns nasty.
90	8	"Episode 8"	29 March 2009	N/A
Drug detecting dogs are used to screen thousands of airport passengers moving through custom passport checks and waiting at the baggage carousel.
91	9	"Episode 9"	5 April 2009	N/A
Thai nationals get dawn raided by immigration officials.
92	10	"Episode 10"	12 April 2009	N/A

=== Season 8 (2009) ===
No. overall	No. in season	Title	Original release date	Viewers (millions)
93	1	"Episode 1"	13 September 2009	N/A
Unusual clues could mean there's trouble ahead for an American designer. Officers have serious questions for a very flamboyant traveller. And a passenger tries to start a food fight.
94	2	"Episode 2"	20 September 2009	N/A
A former Miss USA contestant has officers suspicious, and officers find bizarre contents inside a bag. Plus, a romantic reunion on hold, and one of the most brazen attempts at smuggling contraband into the country.
95	3	"Episode 3"	27 September 2009	N/A
Staff are given enough reason to suspect a bomb is in someone's luggage and the entire airport is shut down. Elsewhere, travellers challenge the highly trained intuition of Customs officers and a businessman's ambitions hit a snag.
96	4	"Episode 4"	28 September 2009	N/A
A nervous traveller arriving from China raises suspicion. A family from the US have nothing to declare, but their luggage suggest otherwise. And a Romanian man struggles to get his story straight.
97	5	"Episode 5"	11 October 2009	N/A
Customs officers look closely at a curious keyboard. Then, a delay at Quarantine results in a lovers quarrel, and suspicious letters from India have the Mail Centre on alert.
98	6	"Episode 6"	18 October 2009	N/A
The conclusion to the Romanian keyboard mystery, an Aussie's questioned after partying hard in Mexico and a traveller argues that he's not who officials believe him to be.
99	7	"Episode 7"	25 October 2009	N/A
An Italian man may want to clown around illegally, a German passenger's nervous behaviour raises alarm and a couple is suspected of sneaking in treats.
100	8	"Episode 8"	1 November 2009	N/A
A passenger is removed from a plane before take-off, a couple makes a desperate plea, and a New York graffiti artist claims he has been framed.
101	9	"Episode 9"	4 November 2009	N/A
A New Zealand passenger is unhappy about being questioned about his visa, an incredible situation in customs and a passengers life could be in danger. Three agencies join forces to target illegal taxi drivers.
102	10	"Episode 10"	8 November 2009	N/A
Tonight on Border Security, a heated standoff after the discovery of an illegal weapon, a first time traveller is on a high and seems oblivious to what is at stake. And a shoe concealment has a passenger lost for words.
103	11	"Episode 11"	11 November 2009	N/A
Why are drug detector dogs reacting to these two passengers? The discovery of an extremely expensive and highly prohibited item. This New Zealand passengers violent criminal past poses a threat.
104	12	"Episode 12"	15 November 2009	N/A
105	13	"Episode 13"	18 November 2009	N/A
106	14	"Episode 14"	22 November 2009	N/A
A strange bulge on a passenger's body raises suspicions; and there's a major problem with a shipment of cosmetics.
107	15	"Episode 15"	25 November 2009	N/A

=== Season 9 (2010) ===
No. overall	No. in season	Title	Original release date	Viewers (millions)
108	1	"Episode 1"	14 February 2010	N/A
A Singaporean passenger arrives for a holiday, but Customs officers are more interested in the declared food that he has brought with him. A dawn raid by Immigration takes a few people by surprise. A woman returning from Italy has to get past Quarantine officers before she can meet her husband.
109	2	"Episode 2"	21 February 2010	N/A
An Australian passenger returning from Lebanon brings a bag that, when its contents are emptied, turns out to be full of surprises. A young American finds out the hard way that you never really know someone. Quarantine find a box of noodles with a very expensive price tag.
110	3	"Episode 3"	28 February 2010	N/A
Three men arrive with clues in all their bags, it might prove one thing. A search ends with a dramatic walkout. And officers think this laptop hides evidence of a massive scam, but the passenger claims he is innocent.
111	4	"Episode 4"	7 March 2010	N/A
A passenger admits to using narcotics, but officers make a find that he'll struggle to explain. This man was living a life of crime, but the right girl is now on the wrong side of the border. And the discovery of a mysterious substance puts officers on the highest alert.
112	5	"Episode 5"	14 March 2010	N/A
A woman attempts to blough her way across the border, but officers will find all the answers they need. This is not the first time immigration has had a problem with this passenger. And a surprise find ends in tears.
113	6	"Episode 6"	21 March 2010	N/A
He's had a holiday with his mates in Bali and returned with a bag full of mischief. The fashion world is in for a shock with this incredible concealment. And the investigation which may prove this Irish backpacker is involved in a massive scam.
114	7	"Episode 7"	2010	TBD
A Malaysian traveller has arrived at the Gold Coast Airport with a strange object strapped to his body. A package sent from Brazil ostensibly containing a jewellery box alerts the suspicions of customs officers.
115	8	"Episode 8"	2010	TBD
A black bag containing flick knives, has arrived in Perth without its owner. A package containing fuel filters arrives at the mail centre from Ecuador and officers notice something unusual about it. A Chinese couple say that they have no food in their luggage, but they are loaded with prohibited items such as fresh ginger, 2 whole chickens and a feather duster made out of real bird feathers.
116	9	"Episode 9"	2010	TBD
Compliance Raid in Adelaide uncovers two illegal workers who are owed $10,000 in back pay from their employer. An English passenger arrives at Brisbane airport on a working holiday. Customs find a small amount of cannabis in his luggage. A parcel from Canada is being x-rayed and shows that a jackhammer is inside, but there are some abnormalities.
117	10	"Episode 10"	2010	TBD
A father and son arrive back from a holiday in Thailand, carrying an insect in a tube for good luck. When their bags are swabbed they come back positive for heroin and amphetamine. A detector dog has picked out a package from Argentina. An angry Chinese Australian returning home has declared nothing on his card.. But when his bags are inspected they find pet food for fish and birds.
118	11	"Episode 11"	2010	TBD
An American DJ arrives in Sydney with only $50. A swab comes back positive for meth & cocaine. He admits that he did drugs a couple of days earlier in the US. Two Philippine men arrive in Australia as tree quality checkers. A shipment of doors has come in from Hong Kong. After weighing them – it is discovered that one is heavier than the others.
119	12	"Episode 12"	2010	TBD
A man arrives from Bangkok with a false passport and an old ratty children's book. A man arriving from Lebanon gets very angry at his wife for hiding undeclared food from him. DAF officers scan a parcel from Germany that contains an animal once thought to be extinct.
120	13	"Episode 13"	2010	TBD
A couple who broke up during a holiday to the US have arrived in Brisbane where a detector dog has a reaction to one of their bags. A Japanese woman, under an exclusion period tries to enter Australia under a married name.
121	14	"Episode 14"	2010	TBD
An Australian boxer just arrived from Dubai is found to be carrying 16 vials of Testosterone. A Korean man arrives wishing to re-enter Australia. A Thai lady arrives with almost 10 kg of food in her bags.
122	15	"Episode 15"	2010	TBD
A man arrives at Brisbane airport with plant material in his bags that he claims are for 'black magic'. A young US passenger has come to Australia on a 3 month tourist visa to do a course on life coaching. But her Australian boyfriend tells a different story.
123	16	"Episode 16"	2010	TBD
A man's erratic behaviour has caught the eye of officers. He says he is here to see his sick father and has no money as he lost it all gambling in Las Vegas. Two teenager 'computer technicians' arrive at Gold coast claiming to be here on a holiday. A container full of fish is opened at Melbourne Cargo.
124	17	"Episode 17"	2010	TBD
A NZ welder is coming into the country to work and Customs need to make sure that he is not bringing contraband into the country. Two young Israeli guys arrive in Sydney from NZ and DIAC officers suspect that they are here to work, either selling paintings or selling beauty products in shopping malls. A Vietnamese man is in danger of missing his connecting flight, after undeclared food is found in his bag.
125	18	"Episode 18"	2010	TBD
A pregnant woman arrives at Melbourne airport for a 3 day holiday. Quinland the detector dog does a hard days work searching for contraband hidden in letters at the mail centre in Melbourne.
126	19	"Episode 19"	2010	TBD
A pregnant woman travels to Melbourne for a 3 day holiday, but officers aren't convinced she's only here for shopping. A package arrives at the mail centre with a terrible smell.
127	20	"Episode 20"	2010	TBD
A passenger arriving from Vietnam becomes aggressive when Customs officers drill into his wooden statues. A container ship of sweet smelling dates has arrived and after an x-ray there are some inconsistencies in the scan.

=== Season 10 (2015) ===
No. overall	No. in season	Title	Original release date	Viewers (millions)
128	1	"Episode 1"	24 June 2015	794,000
Officers are concerned by a passenger's bizarre behaviour when traces of a drug known as 'Charlie Sheen' are found. A gruesome find in the mail room may be linked to witchcraft. Immigration suspect a baby-faced tourist may be an imposter.
129	2	"Episode 2"	1 July 2015	741,000
A bungling drug mule tries every trick to avoid being caught. An elderly gambler's luck runs out when Immigration uncover his ongoing scam. Biosecurity intercept a delivery from Russia which is suspected to be part of the illegal trade in endangered animals.
130	3	"Episode 3"	8 July 2015	697,000
A bunch of Aussies returning from Thailand are all packing a shocking concealment. A man on the run from Immigration detention tries to escape capture. Officers smash a sophisticated drug syndicate.
131	4	"Episode 4"	15 July 2015	693,000
When a woman pushes away a sniffer dog, officers home in on what she has stuffed in her undies, a young man's past is exposed and two Indian passengers will say just about anything to get out of a fine.
132	5	"Episode 5"	22 July 2015	743,000
Officers search an aircraft when it is feared that a jumpy, sweating passenger has dumped contraband on board. A gang of hustlers are stopped at the border and their scam is soon uncovered. When a doctor is caught falsifying a legal document he tries to blame it all on his wife.
133	6	"Episode 6"	5 August 2015	753,000
In Border's biggest drug bust, a shipment of narcotics is discovered in the most unlikely of places. Also, the discovery of a mystery bag finally reveals the truth behind an imposter's lies. Note: Episodes 6 and 7 originally played as a double episode.
134	7	"Episode 7"	5 August 2015	753,000
In Border's biggest drug bust, a shipment of narcotics is discovered in the most unlikely of places. Also, the discovery of a mystery bag finally reveals the truth behind an imposter's lies. Note: Episodes 6 and 7 originally played as a double episode.
135	8	"Episode 8"	12 August 2015	747,000
An elderly man is caught delivering a suitcase with a shocking concealment. A father travels to save his daughter in an abusive relationship. A Chinese couple is caught with much food in their bags.
136	9	"Episode 9"	19 August 2015	811,000
Officers take chase when some illegal foreigners make a daring escape. Three young men are caught being paid to be couriers for illegal smugglers. A traveller finds himself in a sticky situation.
137	10	"Episode 10"	26 August 2015	770,000
When traces of cocaine are found on the belongings of a family returning from South America, one of them makes a confession. Officers suspect a Ukrainian man isn't just there for a business trip.
138	11	"Episode 11"	2 September 2015	758,000
A passenger who is carrying clumps of human hair becomes hysterical when her luggage returns positive readings for drugs. Immigration has concerns about an Indonesian man who is travelling with several disturbing documents and officers are suspicious about a child's car seat.
139	12	"Episode 12"	9 September 2015	799,000
Immigration detain a bus load of illegal workers but their organiser is not giving in without a fight. An Aussie is far from happy about having her bag searched and begins to mouth off.
140	13	"Episode 13"	7 October 2015	774,000
141	14	"Episode 14"	14 October 2015	860,000
142	15	"Episode 15"	21 October 2015	881,000
Border Force officers are left in shock when inspecting the luggage of a Vietnamese woman suspected to be involved in drugs. Later, biosecurity try to teach a stubborn student an important lesson.
143	16	"Episode 16"	28 October 2015	857,000
Detector dogs stop an elderly man with an extremely high risk item and he's far from happy about it. An evasive passenger tries everything to avoid questioning about his reason for crossing the border.

=== Season 11 (2016) ===
No. overall	No. in season	Title	Original release date	Viewers (millions)
144	1	"Episode 1"	17 July 2016	705,000
An American couple admit to using medicinal marijuana at home in California and officers suspect they may be trying to smuggle drugs into Australia.
145	2	"Episode 2"	20 July 2016	767,000
An Asian woman stuns officers with her outrageous behaviour, shedding tears and throwing a tantrum. Also, traces of a date-rape drug are found on a Chinese man's luggage.
146	3	"Episode 3"	24 July 2016	732,000
Officers must establish whether an Indonesian woman is lying or the victim of identity theft. Also, officers catch a Vietnamese student with a stash of seafood infested by exotic pests.
147	4	"Episode 4"	27 July 2016	699,000
High Traces of Methamphetamines are detected on an American woman's luggage and officers suspect a pregnant Japanese woman is trying to courier drugs.
148	5	"Episode 5"	31 July 2016	780,000
A passenger travelling with a snow board during summer has officers concerned he's got something hidden inside. Later, a Hong Kong fisherman is found to be carrying live bait.
149	6	"Episode 6"	3 August 2016	656,000
A Malaysian man says he's here for a holiday but officers suspect he's here to work. Also, a shipment of water looks to be loaded with an illicit substance.
150	7	"Episode 7"	31 August 2016	732,000
Officers question an American woman when they suspect she's arrived to perform unlawful work in the sex trade. Also, a Chinese mother and son get caught red-handed with high-risk concealment.
151	8	"Episode 8"	7 September 2016	728,000
Officers fear a cocaine user may be smuggling drugs in a dangerous place after his quick trip to South America.
152	9	"Episode 9"	14 September 2016	619,000
Officers are on high alert when an Italian man's luggage appears to have been tampered with and they suspect they're dealing with a drug courier.
153	10	"Episode 10"	21 September 2016	660,000
An English Ex-Con tries to hide his dangerous past and it could stop him from entering to meet his new born granddaughter.
154	11	"Episode 11"	28 September 2016	635,000
Officers spot a traveller behaving very strangely and he acts up when he's caught out breaking the law. Also, a US citizen is detained when officers suspect he's been working unlawfully in the country.
155	12	"Episode 12"	25 October 2016	657,000
A Vietnamese man causes concern when he claims he doesn't know what's in his bag. Officers fear the worst when an x-ray shows something suspicious. Officers find a deadly concealment in a kid's toy.

=== Season 12 (2017) ===
No. overall	No. in season	Title	Original release date	Viewers (millions)
156	1	"Episode 1"	14 June 2017	N/A
157	2	"Episode 2"	5 July 2017	N/A
158	3	"Episode 3"	16 July 2017	N/A
159	4	"Episode 4"	19 July 2017	N/A
160	5	"Episode 5"	23 July 2017	N/A
161	6	"Episode 6"	26 July 2017	N/A
162	7	"Episode 7"	2 August 2017	N/A
163	8	"Episode 8"	16 August 2017	N/A
164	9	"Episode 9"	23 August 2017	N/A
165	10	"Episode 10"	30 August 2017	N/A
166	11	"Episode 11"	6 September 2017	N/A
167	12	"Episode 12"	20 September 2017	N/A
168	13	"Episode 13"	4 October 2017	N/A
169	14	"Episode 14"	11 October 2017	N/A

=== Season 13 (2018) ===
No. overall	No. in season	Title	Original release date	Viewers (millions)
170	1	"Episode 1"	31 July 2018	423,000
A nervous passenger gets the attention of officers when a vile stench is detected in his luggage. A Chinese couple try to blame their children for bringing a major biosecurity risk.
171	2	"Episode 2"	16 August 2018	426,000
172	3	"Episode 3"	23 August 2018	426,000
173	4	"Episode 4"	28 August 2018	418,000
174	5	"Episode 5"	6 September 2018	N/A
175	6	"Episode 6"	8 October 2018	N/A
Officers know a male passenger is lying to them, they just need to work out what he is hiding. A grisly package containing animal parts has biosecurity officers on edge.
176	7	"Episode 7"	15 October 2018	513,000
A nervous man alarms officers. Two Brazilian men claim to be best friends but officers suspect it's a cover for illegal activity. A huge amount of prohibited food shocks Biosecurity.
177	8	"Episode 8"	22 October 2018	567,000
A young designer from LA arrives with a suspicious bag. Biosecurity officers uncover a huge quantity of high-risk items in the luggage of a Chinese student.
178	9	"Episode 9"	21 November 2018	642,000
A nervous man has brought a bag of tea and coffee which turns out to be much more than a beverage. A couple returning to Australia have a very creepy collection they've brought home with them.
179	10	"Episode 10"	28 November 2018	N/A
Officers are concerned a passenger may be up to a lot more than he's letting on. A container from China that will blow the lid off a massive criminal syndicate. Also, a huge threat to our biosecurity.

=== Season 14 (2019–2020) ===
No. overall	No. in season	Title	Original release date	Viewers (millions)
180	1	"Episode 1"	3 July 2019	459,000
A young designer from LA arrives with a suspicious bag. Biosecurity officers uncover a huge quantity of high risk items in the luggage of a Chinese student.
181	2	"Episode 2"	10 July 2019	409,000
A nervous man has brought a bag of tea and coffee which turns out to be much more than a beverage. A couple returning to Australia have a very creepy collection they've brought home with them.
182	3	"Episode 3"	17 July 2019	521,000
Officers come across a box from Malaysia that seems a little unusual and reveals something frightening. Officer Shane investigates a delivery of chip packets that contain something less than savoury.
183	4	"Episode 4"	17 September 2019	458,000
Go behind the scenes of Australia's customs, quarantine and immigration departments.
184	5	"Episode 5"	20 October 2019	361,000
Officers are concerned a passenger may be up to a lot more than he's letting on. A container from China that will blow the lid off a massive criminal syndicate. Also, a huge threat to our biosecurity.
185	6	"Episode 6"	22 March 2020	767,000
Go behind the scenes of Australia's customs, quarantine and immigration departments.
186	7	"Episode 7"	30 March 2020	Not in Top 20
A Brazilian woman arriving from New Zealand is caught with what looks like an implement to snort cocaine. Border Force execute a warrant in search of a Sri Lankan man they think is here illegally.
187	8	"Episode 8"	31 March 2020	345,000
A convicted drug smuggler returns to Australia for the first time since his arrest 15 years ago. The special investigations unit execute a dramatic raid on a storage facility.
188	9	"Episode 9"	5 April 2020	470,000
An American man makes a shocking confession in one of Borders most dramatic busts. A strange package from Russia is found to contain an extremely rare and unusual item.
189	10	"Episode 10"	19 May 2020	475,000
When a Chinese man is reluctant to answer officer's questions, they soon realise he's covering for a partner in crime. What a man has hidden in his bag could have a devastating effect on biosecurity.
190	11	"Episode 11"	12 October 2020	N/A
Officers want to know the reason for a French traveller's extremely nervous behaviour. Biosecurity officers find a disgusting concealment in the luggage of a woman arriving from Vietnam.
191	12	"Episode 12"	12 October 2020	N/A
A passenger has declared only tobacco but it's clear straight away he isn't telling the whole truth. Border Force officers at the Sydney Mail Centre make an interesting find inside hydraulic pumps.
192	13	"Episode 13"	2020	TBD
Biosecurity stop a woman entering the country with some extremely dangerous and prohibited goods. A Chinese teacher says he is here for an 11 day holiday but his suitcase is void of clothing.
193	14	"Episode 14"	2020	TBD
Biosecurity dog Cody makes a fishy discovery in the bags of a mother daughter couple returning from Vietnam. An x-ray image on a package from Tanzania shows something that looks like a head.
194	15	"Episode 15"	2020	TBD
When officers stop a woman from Canada, they suspect she's not here for business as she claims. This investigation unravels one of the most elaborate concealments ever seen at the Border.

=== Season 15 (2021) ===
No. overall	No. in season	Title	Original release date	Viewers (millions)
195	1	"Episode 1"	TBA	TBD
196	2	"Episode 2"	TBA	TBD
197	3	"Episode 3"	TBA	TBD
198	4	"Episode 4"	TBA	TBD
199	5	"Episode 5"	TBA	TBD
200	6	"Episode 6"	TBA	TBD
201	7	"Episode 7"	TBA	TBD
202	8	"Episode 8"	TBA	TBD
203	9	"Episode 9"	TBA	TBD
204	10	"Episode 10"	TBA	TBD
205	11	"Episode 11"	March 8, 2021	N/A
206	12	"Episode 12"	March 9, 2021	N/A
207	13	"Episode 13"	March 9, 2021	N/A
208	14	"Episode 14"	March 9, 2021	N/A
209	15	"Episode 15"	March 10, 2021	N/A
210	16	"Episode 16"	March 10, 2021	N/A
211	17	"Episode 17"	March 11, 2021	N/A
212	18	"Episode 18"	March 11, 2021	N/A
213	19	"Episode 19"	March 12, 2021	N/A
214	20	"Episode 20"	March 12, 2021	N/A
215	21	"Episode 21"	May 3, 2021	N/A
216	22	"Episode 22"	May 3, 2021	N/A

=== Season 16 (2022) ===
No. overall	No. in season	Title	Original release date	Viewers (millions)
217	1	"Episode 1"	TBA	TBD
218	2	"Episode 2"	TBA	TBD
219	3	"Episode 3"	TBA	TBD
220	4	"Episode 4"	TBA	TBD
221	5	"Episode 5"	TBA	TBD
222	6	"Episode 6"	TBA	TBD

== Series ratings ==
Season	Episodes	Originally aired		Viewership			
Season	Episodes	Season premiere	Season finale	Viewers (viewers)	Rating	Rank	Ref
1	10	13 October 2004	15 December 2004	—N/a			
2	11	10 February 2005	21 April 2005	1.822	13.2	#1	
3	19	16 May 2006	19 September 2006	2.119	15.2	#1	
4	10	2 November 2006	14 March 2007	1.569	11.2	#3	
5	22	2 July 2007	26 November 2007	1.828	13.0	#2	
6	20	11 February 2008	22 June 2008	1.610	11.3	#3	
7	10	8 February 2009	12 April 2009	1.499	10.3	#1	
8	17	13 September 2009	14 October 2009	1.480	10.2	#3	
9	20	14 February 2010	4 April 2010	1.229	8.3	#5	
10	16	22 September 2010	10 November 2010	1.229	8.3	#5	
11	12	6 February 2011	10 April 2011	1.090	7.1	#2	
12	14	5 February 2012	31 March 2012	0.976	6.2	#7	
13	17	3 February 2013	17 September 2013	0.966	6.1	#4	
14	18	27 February 2014	5 October 2014	0.818	5.1	#5	
15	22	24 June 2015	28 October 2015	TBA	TBA	TBA	

== International versions ==
A Canadian version of the show, titled Border Security: Canada's Front Line, began airing in 2012 in Canada. It was cancelled after three seasons, due to the Canadian Privacy Commissioner ruling that the show and the CBSA had breached the privacy act.

An American version of the show, titled Homeland Security USA, began airing in 2009 in the United States. It ran for 13 episodes, two of which have never been aired.

A British version of the show, titled Nothing to Declare UK, aired in 2011 in the United Kingdom.

A Latin American version of the show, titled Alerta Aeropuerto filmed at El Dorado Airoport in Bogota, Colombia and Jorge Chavez Airoport in Lima, Peru began airing 2016 in Latin America on National Geographic Channel.

A second American version called Border Security: America's Front Line started airing on ABC in September 2016.

== See also ==
- Border Patrol (TV series)
