= UK Border Force (TV series) =

- Second series title card.
- Narrated by: Timothy Spall (2008); Bill Nighy (2009)
- Country of origin: United Kingdom
- Original language: English
- No. of series: 2
- No. of episodes: 18

Production
- Running time: 60 minutes (including advertisements)

Original release
- Network: Sky1
- Release: 9 September 2008 – 11 November 2009

Related
- Border Security: Australia's Front Line; Border Security: Canada's Front Line; Homeland Security USA; Border Patrol New Zealand; Customs

UK Border Force is a documentary series that focused on the work of the UK Border Agency of the United Kingdom, and revealed the action behind the scenes of immigration to the country.

The series follows officers at Heathrow Terminal 3 and the ports of Dover and Calais, and follows enforcement teams operating within the UK to detect illegal workers. The series also highlights the work of entry clearance officers at British diplomatic missions overseas.

The series contained 8 episodes.

== See also ==
- Border Security: Australia's Front Line
- Border Security: Canada's Front Line
- Border Patrol (New Zealand TV series)
