= Scream Team =

British reality television series

- Scream Team
- Genre: Paranormal television
- Directed by: Simon George
- Narrated by: Crispin Redman
- Composer: Christian Henson
- Country of origin: United Kingdom
- Original language: English
- No. of seasons: 1
- No. of episodes: 13

Production
- Executive producers: Richard Woolfe (for LivingTV); Jane Millichip (for LivingTV); Ben Devlin; Nigel Leigh
- Producer: David Robb
- Production company: Making Time Productions

Original release
- Network: Living TV
- Release: 13 September – 8 December 2002

Scream Team (stylised as ScreamTeam) is a paranormal reality TV series, produced by Making Time, which was broadcast on Living TV in 2002.

== Premise ==
A reality TV show in which six young people travelled around the UK in a large Silver campervan, investigating ghosts, folklore and supernatural locations. They were selected from over eight hundred hopefuls at auditions in the summer of 2001 in London. The team consisted of believers and sceptics of the paranormal.

Scream Team was described by its creators as a cross between The Blair Witch Project and Scooby-Doo.

It's often repeated on British satellite and cable television channels Ftn and Living TV.

An introductory episode titled Meet the Team was broadcast on 13 September 2002.

== Cast ==
- Phil Whyman (went on to become a paranormal investigator on Living TV's Most Haunted)
- Becky Kitter
- Sheyla Shehovich
- Amy Jones
- Dan Ainsworth
- Sam Witcher

== Episodes ==
Episode	Title	Description	Broadcast Date
Pilot	Meet the Team	Introduction to the team members.	13 September 2002
Episode 1	Witchcraft in Clapham Woods	Is this East Sussex Wood really haunted?	24 September 2002
Episode 2	Blue Bell Hill	The team investigate the case of ghostly hitchhiker, causing chaos on a dual carriageway in Kent.	1 October 2002
Episode 3	Bristol Poltergeist	The team investigate a poltergeist in a Bristol family's home, and visit the Ram Inn, Wotton-under-Edge, Gloucestershire.	8 October 2002
Episode 4	The Crying Boy	The team investigate a legend of a cursed painting causing fires in Northern England.	15 October 2002
Episode 5	UFOs on Ilkley Moor	Alien abduction experiences come under scrutiny on Ilkley Moor.	22 October 2002
Episode 6	Animal Mutilation	Cryptozoology provides the theme for this episode, in Loftus, North Yorkshire.	29 October 2002
Episode 7	Edinburgh Vaults	Mary King's Close and the Edinburgh Vaults, beneath the Edinburgh streets, are investigated by the team.	5 November 2002
Episode 8	Robin Hood's Grave	The team investigate Robin Hood's Grave at Kirklees Hall, in Brighouse, West Yorkshire.	12 November 2002
Episode 9	Woodchester Mansion	The team investigate a Gloucestershire mansion, which is reputed to be haunted.	19 November 2002
Episode 10	Jack the Ripper	The Devil's Pyramid in Brighton and Jack the Ripper are examined by the team.	26 November 2002
Episode 11	Carry on Screaming: The Best of Scream Team - Part 1	First part of The Best of Scream Team showing highlights from the series.	3 December 2002
Episode 12	Carry on Screaming: The Best of Scream Team - Part 2	Second part of The Best of Scream Team showing highlights from the series.	8 December 2002
