= Sky Living =

British pay television channel

- Final logo until 2018

Programming
- Picture format: 1080i HDTV (downscaled to 16:9 576i for the SDTV feed.)
- Timeshift service: Sky Living +1

Ownership
- Owner: Sky Group
- Sister channels: List of Sky UK channels

History
- Launched: 1 September 1993; 32 years ago
- Closed: 6 August 2018
- Replaced by: Sky Witness
- Former names: UK Living (1993–1997); Living (1997–2001, 2007–2011); LivingTV (2001–2007)

Sky Living was a British pay television channel owned and operated by Sky. The channel's programming was aimed mainly at women and young adults. Originally launched as UK Living, it became Sky Living by 2011.

== History ==
UK Living began broadcasting on 1 September 1993, as part of the Sky Multichannels network, broadcasting for 18 hours a day, between 7 am and 1 am (changing in 1995 to 6 am until midnight). It was originally owned by a three way partnership; former ITV London franchise holder Thames Television, Tele-Communications Inc. and fellow cable communications company Cox Enterprises, and had a budget of £25million.

By January 1994, Flextech (later known as Virgin Media Television and Living TV Group), took over TCI's shares in UK Living as part of a deal between the two companies

By 1996, Telewest's Flextech division gained full control, after buying out the now-defunct Thames and Cox Enterprises. Shortly afterwards the channel moved away from its reliance on BBC programming, and increased its output of American programming.

In 1997, when the BBC and Flextech launched the UKTV Network: UK Style, UK Horizons and UK Arena, it was decided that UK Living would remain a separate channel. As such, it had to remove the 'UK' branding to avoid being confused with the UKTV services; thus UK Living became Living.

Living launched its website in 2001 as livingtv.co.uk, prior to the channel being renamed LivingTV in December 2001. This was initially represented on-screen by the addition of the letters 'TV' to the established logo. In a 2004 branding relaunch, the way the name was displayed changed to LIVINGtv.

On 28 October 2002, LivingTV launched its first timeshift, LivingTV +1. The channel was a 1-hour timeshift of LivingTV.

In a further change in 2007, the channel name reverted from LIVINGtv back to LIVING (still officially spelt all in capitals, though some media write the name in normal case). In 2009, the idents were changed to a 3D logo, with glass on the side of the 'L' in either pink or blue. Other idents show the logo covered in paint, while Livingit adopted a slightly different appearance.

On 1 April 2009, Living +2, a two-hour timeshift of the channel, launched. It lasted for 15 months and was replaced on 1 July 2010, ahead of the launch of Living Loves.

On 12 June 2009, a high-definition version of the channel was announced as part of a cross-platform strategy to boost the channel's brand.

The channel launched on 6 October 2009 exclusively on Virgin Media. and on 2 September 2010, it launched on Sky channel 224.

On 1 February 2011, the Living HD channel was relaunched as Sky Living HD.

=== Sky ownership ===
BSkyB announced on 25 October 2010, that Living would be rebranded as Sky Living in early 2011 and moving EPG positions on Sky from channel 112 to 107, between Sky One and Sky Atlantic, to improve their entertainment line-up. As part of an attempt to appeal more to men, the channel's pink branding was replaced by a blue and silver logo in September 2013.

On 8 June 2018, Sky announced that the channel would be rebranded as Sky Witness on 6 August 2018.

== Programming ==
The channel was mainly aimed at women aged between 25 and 45, broadcasting films, dramas, chat shows, quiz shows and soap operas. Most of its original programming came from the programme libraries of Thames Television and the BBC. A unique aspect was the repeats of programmes such as Kilroy, Good Morning with Anne and Nick, and Floyd, which were all shown within a week of being transmitted on mainstream television.

In addition, the channel produced its own programmes, including a weekday flagship lifestyle show Live at Three, as well as various agony-style shows which were broadcast in the early afternoon or late at night.

In 2001, the channel helped to launch a whole new genre of paranormal programming with such shows as Crossing Over with John Edward, 6ixth Sense with Colin Fry, Scream Team, Jane Goldman Investigates, Dead Famous, I'm Famous and Frightened! and Most Haunted, which continued to be popular. The channel has also aired Yvette Fielding's Most Haunted and Most Haunted Live!, in which Fielding and the team, that at one point included medium Derek Acorah, investigate haunted locations in the UK and abroad. The show had brought some of the channel's biggest ratings to date.

The channel also launched a number of successful US television shows in the UK market. Past successes include America's Next Top Model, Charmed, Will & Grace, Queer Eye for the Straight Guy, Miss Match, The Golden Girls, Joan of Arcadia, CSI: Crime Scene Investigation, CSI: Miami, Just Shoot Me!, Boston Legal, Criminal Minds, Blindspot, Grey's Anatomy, Ghost Whisperer, The L Word, Men in Trees and the Australian comedy Kath & Kim. In 2008, the channel also debuted the first seasons of Army Wives, Lipstick Jungle, Private Practice, and Viva Laughlin.

Brian Dowling was put forward as one of the public figures to represent the channel – by presenting programming including Celebrity Extra, Trolley Dollies, and a spin-off to I'm Famous and Frightened!. Later, fellow Big Brother contestant Jade Goody became the channel's newest public face, with three different shows devoted to her life, Jade's Salon, Just Jade and Jade's PA, but in January 2007, she was dropped due to the racism row on Celebrity Big Brother. In 2009, when Jade discovered that she had terminal cancer, the channel acquired the exclusive rights to film a documentary through her final days followed by the show producing two-hour-long tribute shows a week after her death followed by a further two tribute shows in 2010 and 2011.

Other reality TV stars which hosted programmes on the channel at this time included Abigail Clancy, the runner up of Britain's Next Top Model (cycle 2) and model Katie Price.

=== Tiny Living ===
In 1995, sister network The Children's Channel introduced a morning strand for younger children called Tiny TCC. It aired every morning from 6 am until 9 am. This block was transferred to Living on 3 February 1997 and renamed Tiny Living (later Tiny Living TV) to fit with the channel's name. Its air times changed to 7 am-9 am on weekdays, and 7 am-10 am during the weekends. The strand was withdrawn at the end of September 2005.

== Most watched programmes ==
The following is a list of the ten most watched programmes on Sky Living, based on Live +7 data supplied by BARB up to 9 April 2017. The number of viewers does not include repeats or airings on +1.

Rank	Programme	Episode	Viewers	Date
1	The Enfield Haunting	1.01 - Episode One	1,871,000	3 May 2015
2	The Enfield Haunting	1.02 - Episode Two	1,302,000	10 May 2015
3	The Enfield Haunting	1.03 - Episode Three	1,262,000	17 May 2015
4	The Blacklist	1.06 – "Gina Zanetakos"	1,197,000	8 October 2013
5	Elementary	2.04 – "Poison Pen"	1,193,000	12 November 2013
6	The Blacklist	1.04 – "The Stewmaker"	1,142,000	25 October 2013
7	Elementary	1.02 – "While You Were Sleeping"	1,119,000	30 October 2012
8	Blindspot	1.02 – "A Stray Howl"	1,117,000	1 December 2015
9	Elementary	1.14 – "The Deductionist"	1,103,000	19 March 2013
10	Elementary	2.06 – "An Unnatural Arrangement"	1,099,000	26 November 2013
10	Elementary	2.01 – Step Nine	1,099,000	22 October 2013

== On Demand ==
The channel had an on demand service which was available on satellite and cable. It offered access to a number of shows which viewers may have missed first time around.

On demand content was added to BT Vision's library on 15 January 2009. 38 hours of programming from six of the channel's shows; Extreme: Skinny Celebrities, Dirty Dancing, Living with the Cheeky Girls, Ibiza 2008 and Most Haunted were available from launch. Subscribers to BT Vision taking the TV and Value Packs were able to access the content with no additional cost; others were able to view it on a pay per view basis with prices starting at 77p. Programming was removed from BT Vision on 13 January 2010.

The channel's on-demand offering was revamped during Autumn 2009 as Living Player on Virgin Media. Living Player offered dedicated seven-day catch-up on shows such as Ghost Whisperer and Grey's Anatomy, as well as hours of archive content previously shown on the channel. Living Player was available on PCs, and the player also offered HD programming for free to all customers on the Virgin Media's XL TV package. Original commissions were to be made available longer term.

== Controversy ==
In 2005, Living TV faced controversy when a poster for their broadcast of The L Word, featuring scantily-dressed women, was the subject of 650 complaints to the Advertising Standards Authority from people who felt it was degrading to women and unsuitable for children. The ASA did not uphold the complaints.

== See also ==
- Sing Date: 2012 dating show shown on Sky Living
