= Jade (disambiguation) =

Jade is an ornamental stone.

(The) Jade(s), JADE(S), may also refer to:

== People and characters ==
- Jade (given name), including lists of fictional characters and real people

=== Mononym ===
- Jade (producer) (born c. 1978), Hungarian musical artist
- Jade Thirlwall (born 1992), English singer known mononymously as Jade
- Mia Yim (Stephanie Bell; born 1989), professional wrestler also known as Jade

=== Surname ===
- Ms. Jade (born c. 1978), American rapper
- Ashley Jade (born 1987), UK singer-songwriter
- Biro Jade, futsal player
- Celina Jade (born 1985), HK actress and celebrity
- Chelsea Jade (born 1989), singer-songwriter
- Claude Jade (1948–2006), stage name of French actress Claude Marcelle Jorré
- Cora Jade, professional wrestler
- Ellyn Jade, Canadian actress
- Hollywood Jade (born 1984), Canadian dancer
- Isobella Jade (born 1982), U.S. author
- Mel Jade, Australian singer-songwriter
- Mikaela Jade, Australian entrepreneur
- Olivia Jade (born 1999), U.S. internet personality
- Samantha Jade (born 1987), Australian singer
- Srivani Jade, Indian singer
- Unjaded Jade (born 2000), UK internet personality

=== Legendary, mythological, religious figures ===
- Jade Emperor, a Taoist god

=== Fictional characters ===
- Jade ("Bratz"), one of the four original Bratz dolls
- Jade (Beyond Good & Evil), videogame character
- Jade (DC Comics), Jennifer-Lynn Hayden, comic book superheroine
- Jade (El Clon), telenovela character
- Jade (Mortal Kombat), videogame character
- Jade West, a main character in Victorious TV sitcom
- Mara Jade, in Star Wars literature
- Princess Jade, a character in Dragon Quest XI

== Places and fictional locations ==
- Jade, Karnataka, a village in India
- Jade City, British Columbia, Canada
- Jade Coast (Côte de Jade), Pays de Retz, Loire-Atlantique, France; a region of western France
- Jade Cove, Big Sur, California, USA; a cove
- Jade District, Portland, Oregon, USA
- Jade Island, Beihai Park, Beijing, China; an island
- Jade Lake, King County, Washington, USA; a lake
- Jade Mountain (disambiguation)
- Jades, Deris Rural District, Central District, Kazerun County, Fars province, Iran; a village

=== Germany ===
- Jade (river), a river in northern Germany
- Jade, Germany, a municipality
- Jade Bight, a bay in Germany (also called the Jade)

=== Facilities, structures ===
- The Jade, Adelaide, South Australia, Australia; a music venue
- Jade's Crossing, Deitling, Kent, England, UK; a footbridge
- Jade Gate, Yumen Pass, Gansu, China; in the Great Wall of China
- Jade Pagoda, Amarapura, Mandalay, Myanmar

== Organizations ==
- Jade Cargo International, a cargo airline
- Florida Jades, Boca Raton, Florida, USA; a pro basketball team in the World Basketball League

== Arts, entertainment, media ==
- Jade: My Autobiography, a 2006 autobiography by Jade Goody
- Jade: With Love, a 2009 UK TV special about Jade Goody

=== Film, stage, television ===
- Jade (1995 film), a 1995 William Friedkin film
- Jade (2024 film), a 2024 film starring Mickey Rourke
- My Binondo Girl also known as Jade, a 2011 Philippine romantic comedy television drama
- TVB Jade, a television channel in Hong Kong
- Jade Solid Gold, a Hong Kong music television programme

=== Music ===
==== Bands ====
- Jade (British band), a 1970s folk-rock band
- Jade (group), a 1990s R&B group
- The Jades, a 1950s doo-wop American group, featuring Lou Reed
- The Jades (American band), 1960s garage rock band
- The Jades (Irish band), a 2000s all-female rock group

==== Albums ====
- Jade (Corey Hart album), 1998
- Jade (Flowing Tears album), 2000
- Jade (Sweetbox album), 2002
- Jade, an album by Jimsaku, 1992

==== Songs ====
- "Jade" (song), a 2011 song by X Japan
- "Jade", a 1973 single by Ronnie Hazlehurst
- "Jade", a 1981 B-side by China Doll
- "Jade", a song from Jade (Corey Hart album)
- "Jade", a song from Jade (Flowing Tears album)
- "Jade", a 1996 song by Hans Zimmer from The Rock soundtrack
- "Jade", a 2016 song by Mike Posner from At Night, Alone

== Computing, electronics, communications ==
- JADE (cypher machine), a Japanese cipher-machine of the early 1940s
- Jade (DSSSL processor), a processor for the Document Style Semantics and Specification Language (DSSSL)
- JADE (planning system) (Joint Assistant for Development and Execution), an automated planning system of the U.S. military
- JADE (programming language), an object-oriented platform developed by the Jade Software Corporation
- Jade, the former name of the Pug JavaScript templating engine; see Comparison of web template engines
- Java Agent Development Framework
- Jade engine, a video-game software developed by Ubisoft
- JSON Advanced Electronic Signatures (JAdES), a type of advanced electronic signature

== Science ==
- JWST Advanced Deep Extragalactic Survey (JADES)
- JADE (particle detector), a particle detector at DESY, Hamburg
- Joint Approximation Diagonalization of Eigen-matrices, an algorithm for independent component analysis by JF Cardoso
- Jovian Auroral Distributions Experiment, an instrument suite on the Juno Jupiter orbiter

== Plants and animals ==
- Semachrysa jade (S. jade), an insect
- Jade / Jade II, a variety of green beans
- Jade plant (Crassula ovata)
- Jade Tree (disambiguation)
- Strongylodon macrobotrys, blue jade vine

== Transportation and vehicular ==
- Honda Jade (motorcycle)
- Honda Jade (automobile)
- USS Jade (PY-17), a WWII U.S. Navy patrol yacht
- Jade-class aircraft carrier, a WWII German ship class

== Other uses ==
- Jade (color), a variation of green
- Jade radical, an element in written Han glyphs
- Jade Treaty (1853) between Prussia and Oldenburg

== See also ==
- Jade Dynasty (disambiguation)
- Jade Green (disambiguation)
- Jadeite (disambiguation)
