= Jade Mountain =

Jade Mountain may refer to:

- Jade Mountain (mythology), mythological mountain in Chinese mythology
- Jade Mountain (North Slope Borough, Alaska), mountain in Alaska
- Jade Mountains, a small offshoot range of the larger Baird Mountains
- Yu Shan, also known as Jade Mountain, the highest mountain in Taiwan

== See also ==
- Jade Dragon Snow Mountain
- Jade Mountain Illustrating the Gathering of Scholars at the Lanting Pavilion
- Temple of the Jade Mountain
- Yushan (disambiguation)
- Jade (disambiguation)
