= Yushan =

Yushan or Yu Shan may refer to:

== People ==
- Zhuang Yushan (born 2003), Chinese volleyball player

== Places ==
- Yushan (玉山), highest point in Taiwan
- Yushan Range (玉山山脈), a mountain range in Taiwan
- Yushan National Park (玉山國家公園), Taiwan
- Yushan County (玉山县), Jiangxi
- Yushan District (雨山区), Ma'anshan, Anhui
- Yushan (Changshu) (虞山), Changshu, Jiangsu
- Yushan Island (漁山列島), Xiangshan, Zhejiang

Towns

- Yushan, Fuding (zh; 嵛山镇), in Fuding, Fujian
- Yushan, Hubei (zh; 峪山镇), in Xiangzhou District, Xiangyang, Hubei
- Yushan, Hunan (禹山镇), in Huarong County
- Yushan, Dong'e County (zh; 鱼山镇), in Dong'e County, Shandong
- Yushan, Jinxiang County (zh; 鱼山镇), in Jinxiang County, Shandong

Written as "玉山镇":

- Yushan, Jian'ou (zh), subdivision of Jian'ou, Fujian
- Yushan, Guizhou (zh), subdivision of Weng'an County, Guizhou
- Yushan, Henan (zh), subdivision of Suiping County, Henan
- Yushan, Kunshan (zh), subdivision of Kunshan, Jiangsu
- Yushan, Shaanxi (zh), subdivision of Lantian County, Shaanxi
- Yushan, Linshu County (zh), subdivision of Linshu County, Shandong
- Yushan, Sichuan (zh), in Bazhou District, Bazhong, Sichuan
- Yushan, Pan'an County (zh), subdivision of Pan'an County, Zhejiang

== Other ==
- Jade Mountain in Chinese mythology
- Yushan-class landing platform dock, named after the mountain in Taiwan

== See also ==
- Jade (disambiguation)
