= Xingfu Temple =

Xingfu Temple (simplified Chinese: 兴福寺; traditional Chinese: 興福寺; pinyin: Xīngfú Sì) may refer to:

- Wuying Pagoda, a Chinese pagoda at Xingfu Temple in Wuchang, Hubei, China
- Xingfu Temple (Changshu), in Changshu, Jiangsu, China
