= Jaded =

Jaded may refer to:

- Jaded (album), a 2003 album by To/Die/For
- Jaded (film), a 1998 film starring Carla Gugino
- Jaded, a 2002 skateboard film from Thrasher Magazine

== Songs ==
- "Jaded" (Aerosmith song), 2000
- "Jaded" (Disclosure song), 2015
- "Jaded" (Drake song), 2018
- "Jaded" (Miley Cyrus song), 2023
- "Brain Stew" / "Jaded", by Green Day, 1996
- "Jaded", by Blindspott, from Blindspott
- "Jaded", by the Crystal Method from Vegas
- "Jaded", by deadmau5, B-side of "Faxing Berlin"
- "Jaded", by Kaash Paige, 2020
- "Jaded", by One Ok Rock from Ambitions, 2017
- "Jaded", by Operation Ivy from Energy
- "Jaded", by Paradise Lost from Draconian Times
- "Jaded", by Spiritbox from The Fear of Fear
- "Jaded", by Takida from ...Make You Breathe
- "Jaded (These Years)", by Mest from Mest

== See also ==
- Jade (disambiguation)
