= Changshu Christian Church =

Church in Jiangsu, China

- 常熟基督教堂
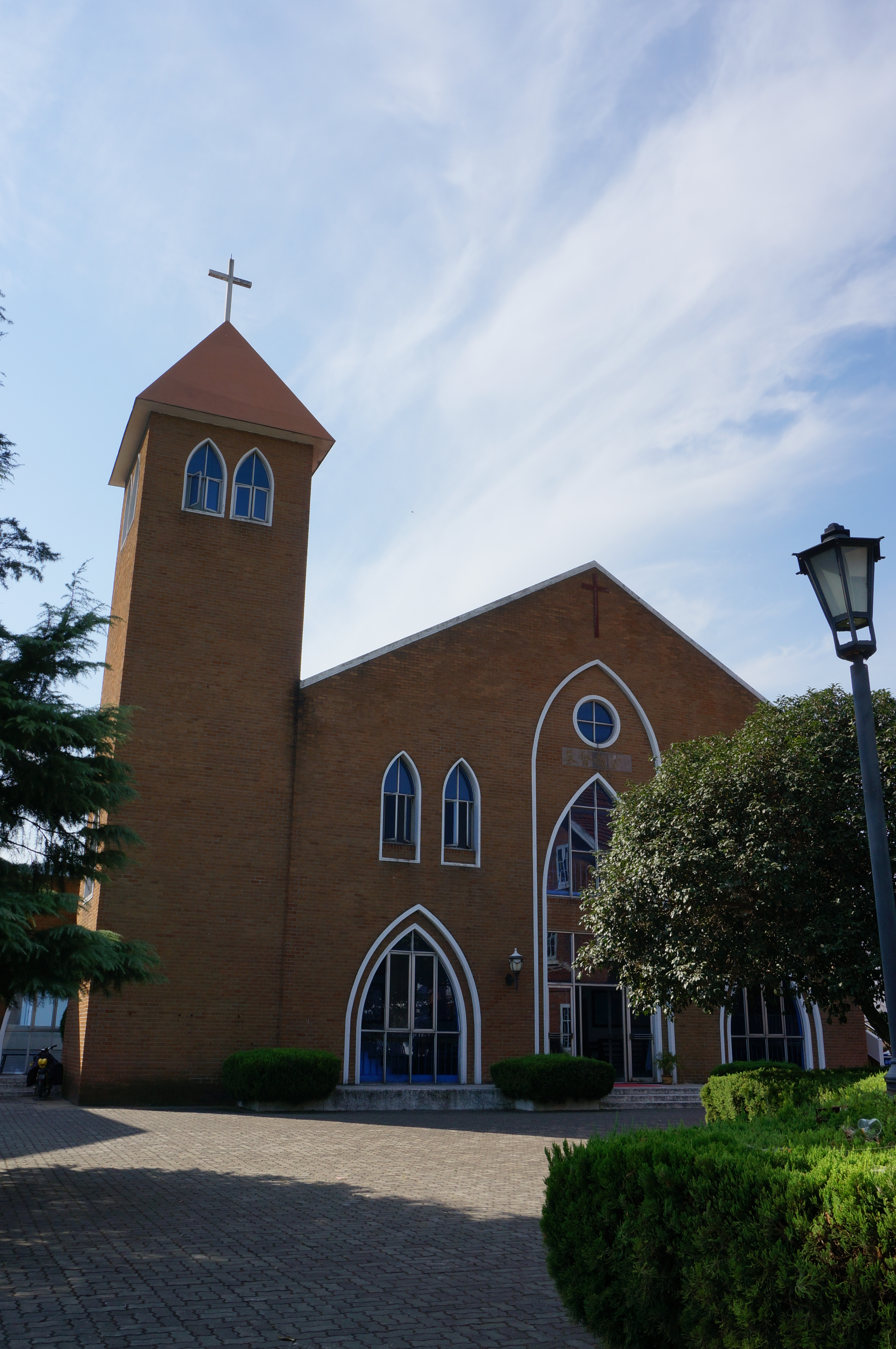
- Changshu Christian Church in October 2014.

- Location in Jiangsu. Changshu Christian Church (China)
- 31°39′04″N 120°44′35″E
- Location: Changshu, Jiangsu, China
- Country: China
- Denomination: Protestantism

History
- Status: Parish church
- Founded: 1902

Architecture
- Functional status: Active
- Architectural type: Church building
- Completed: 1995

Specifications
- Materials: Bricks

Changshu Christian Church (Chinese: 常熟基督教堂; pinyin: Chángshú Jīdūjiàotáng) is a Protestant church located in Changshu, Jiangsu, China.

== History ==
Changshu Christian Church was built in 1902, during late Qing dynasty (1644–1911). In 1937, American Pastor Smith designed the buildings and was completed in 1948. The current building was built in novelist 1995, covering a building area of 1,342 square metres (14,450 sq ft). In May 2005, it was designated as a "Municipality Protected Historic Site" by Changshu government.

== Gallery ==
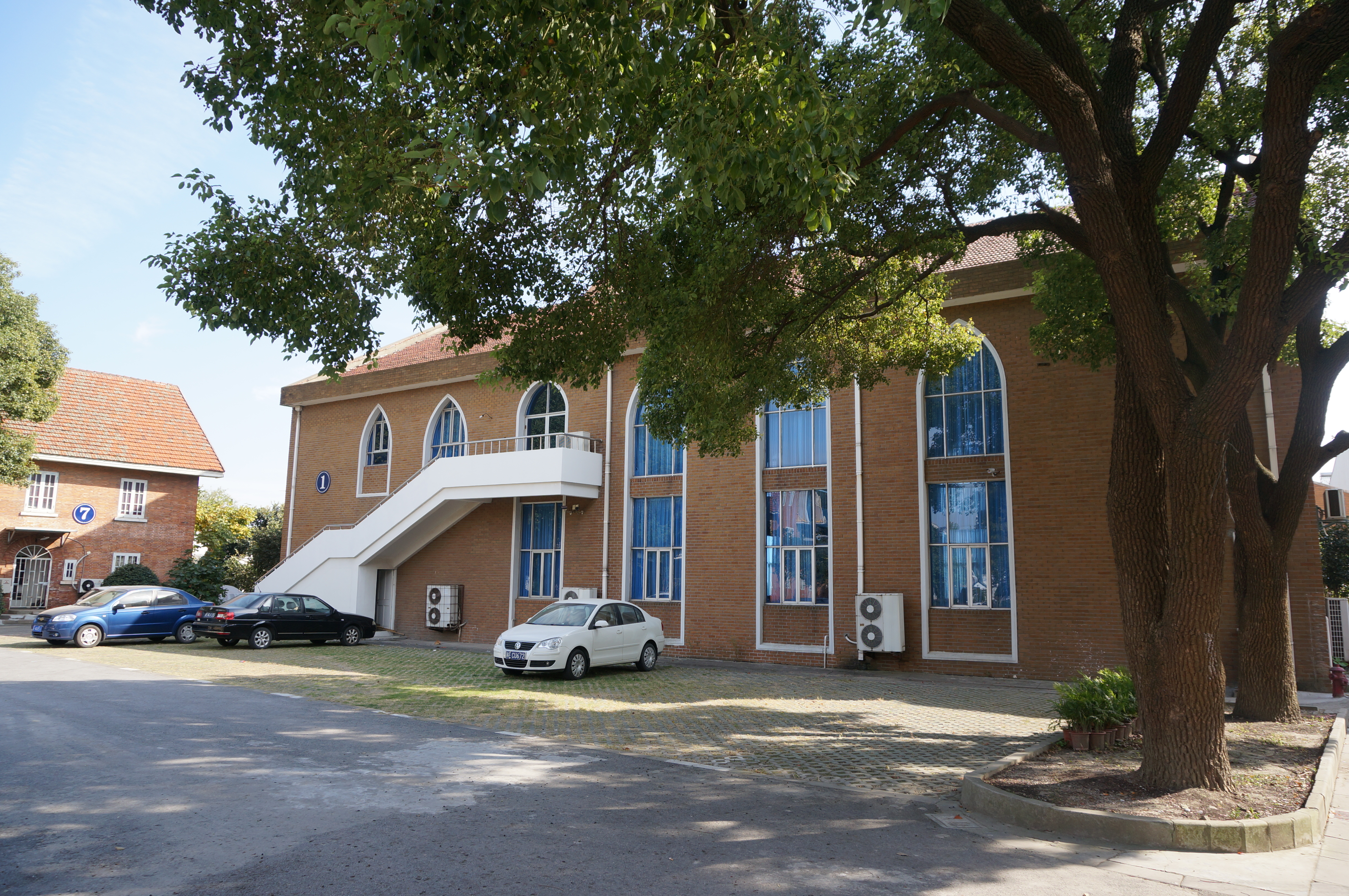
No. 1 building.

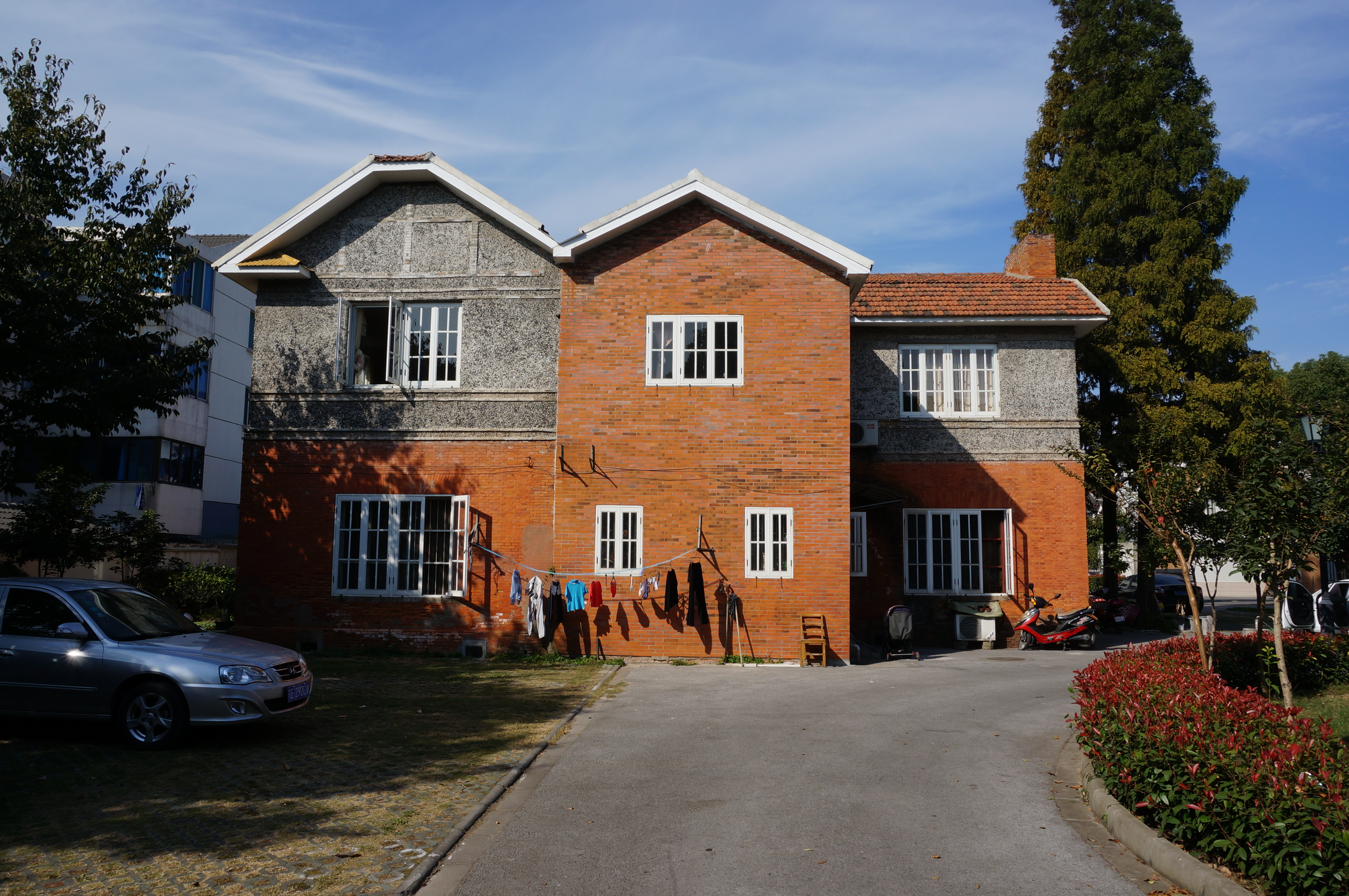
No. 5 building.

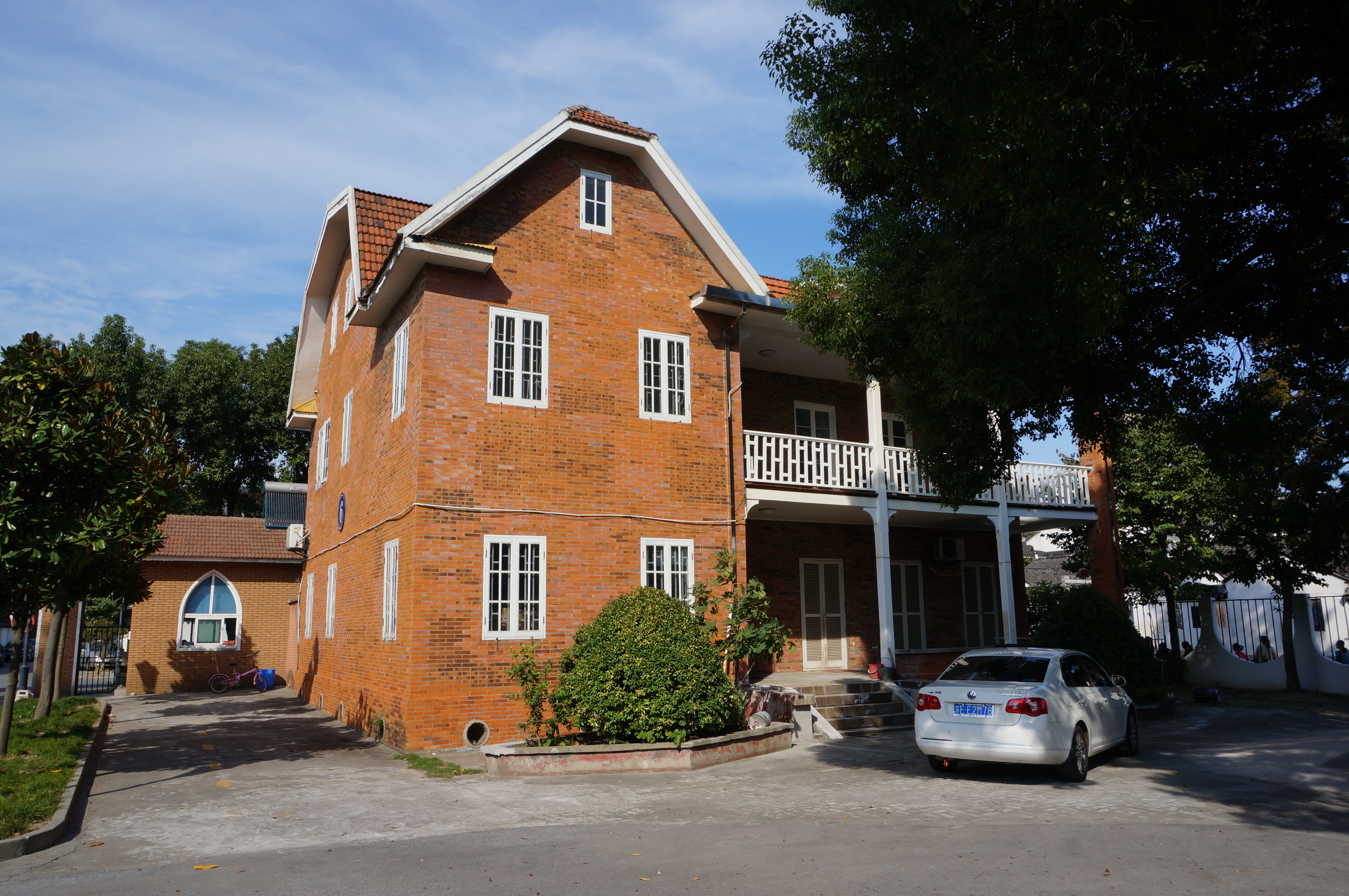
No. 6 building.

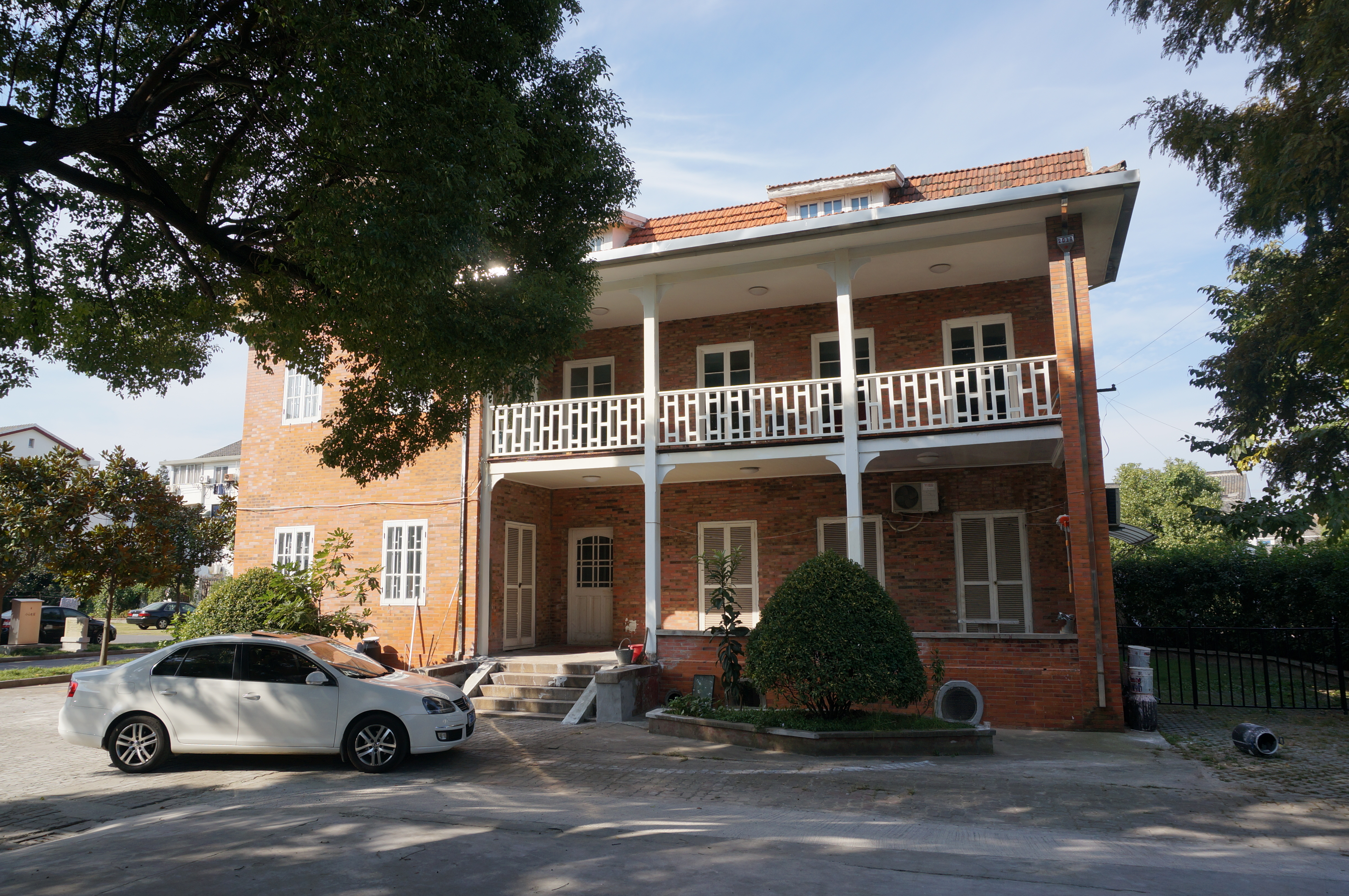
No. 6 building.

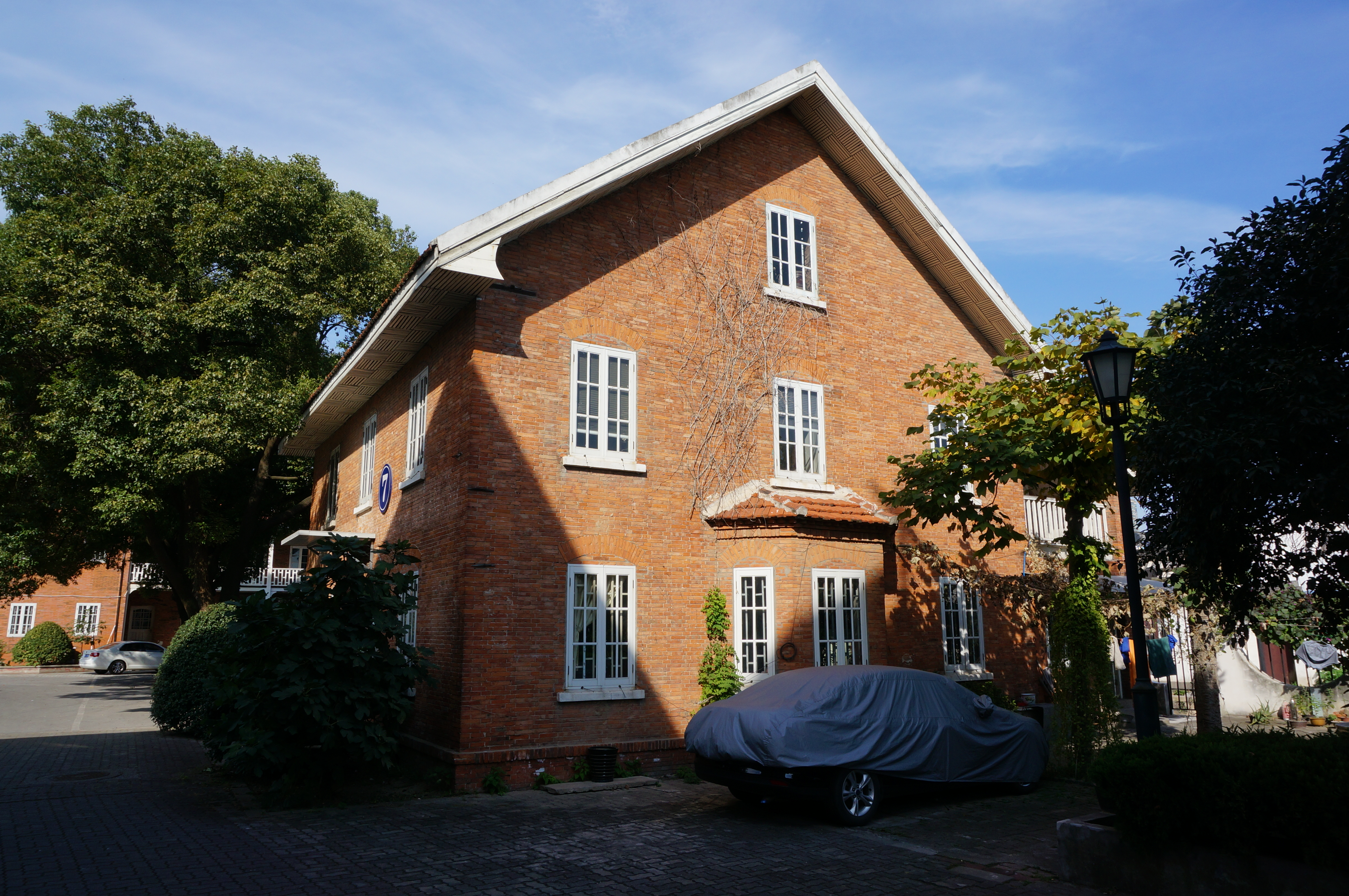
No. 7 building.

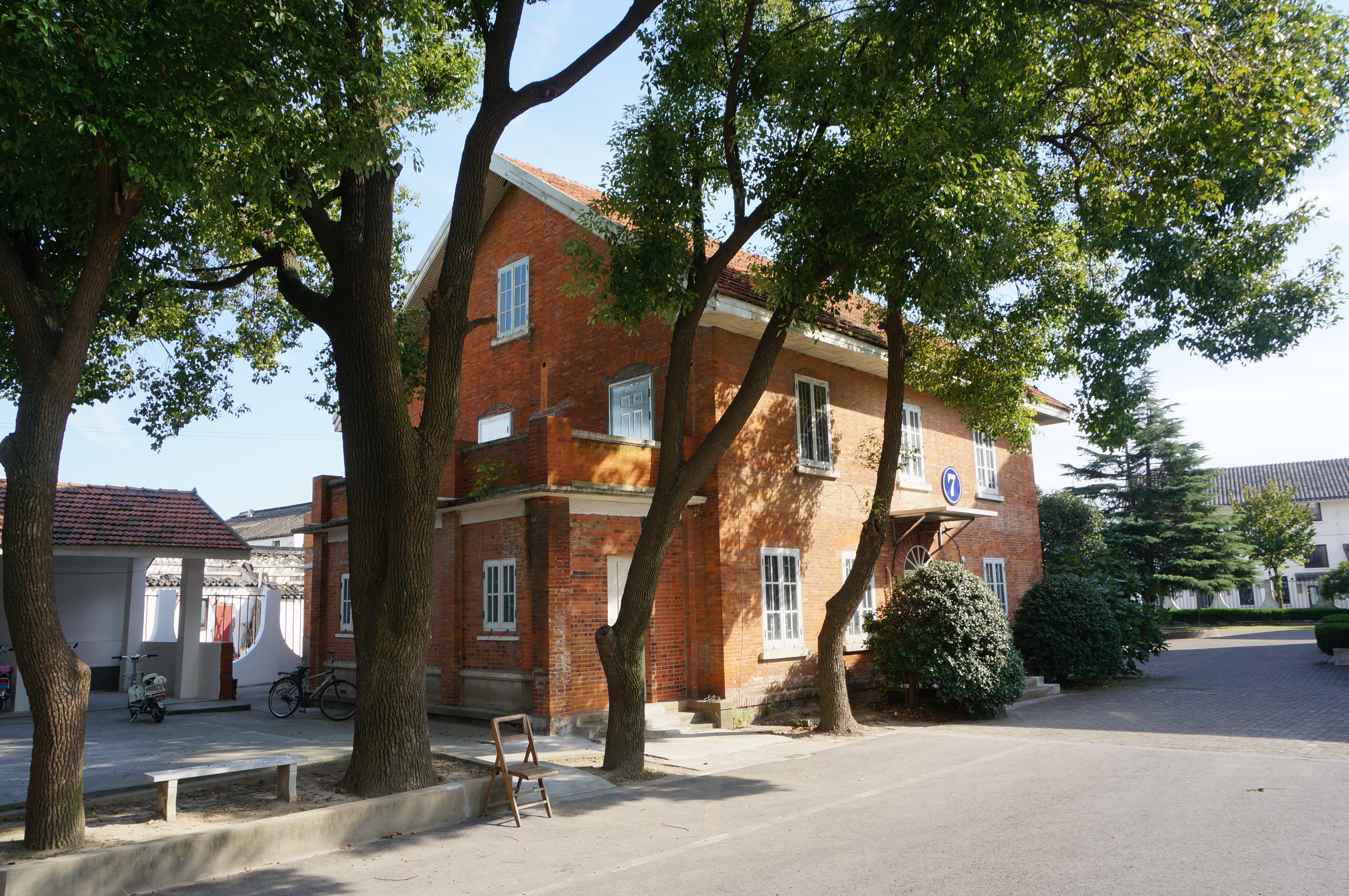
No. 7 building.
