= Shajiabang, Jiangsu =

Town in China

Coordinates: 31.5477°N 120.8430°E

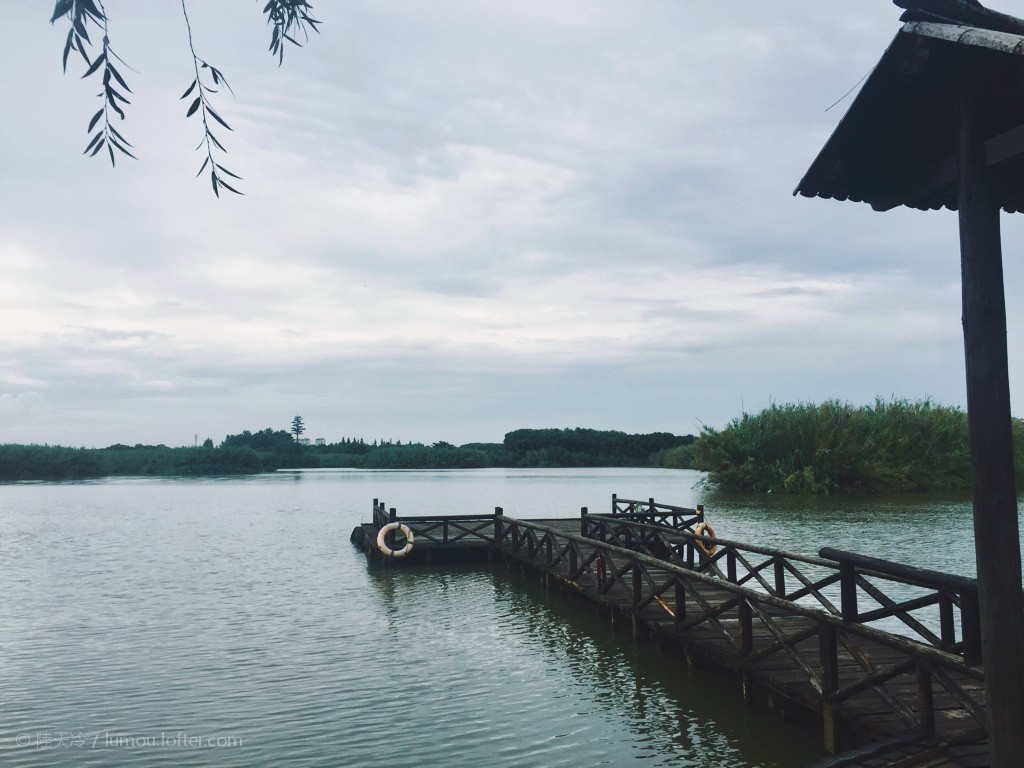
A lake in Shajiabang in July 2017

Shajiabang (Chinese: 沙家浜镇) is a town in Changshu, Suzhou, China; a tourist village located adjacent to Yangcheng Lake in Jiangsu Province, China. There is a scenic area in the town named Shajiabang Resort.

== Tourism attractions ==
Shajiabang Resort covers an area of 5,000 acres (2,000 ha). It comprises various tourist attractions such as the Revolutionary Traditional Education Area, the Redstone folk culture village, the National Defense Education Park, and a reed maze.

== Cultural reference ==
- Shajiabang has found fame as the subject of the Chinese opera Shajiabang which was nationally popular in the 1960s to 1970s (previously written Shachiapang).
- There is a TV series named "Sha Jia Bang" which is acted by Chen Daoming and Xuqing. It tells the story of Aqing, a woman who helps the Chinese army fight against the Japanese army with the aid of some local residents.

== Local products ==
- Yangcheng Lake hairy crab, the best known.
- Duck blood-black glutinous rice sushi
- Green dumplings
- Pictures made from reeds
