= Jade Green =

Jade Green may refer to:

- Jade Green (EastEnders), fictional character
- "Jade Green" (song), a 2024 song by Kacey Musgraves from the album Deeper Well
- Jade (color), a shade of green

== See also ==
- Green Jade, a ship, a crane vessel
- Jade (disambiguation)
- Green (disambiguation)
