= Tomb of Yanzi =

Tomb in Yushan, Changshu, Jiangsu Province, China

Coordinates: 31°38′52.5″N 120°44′27.3″E

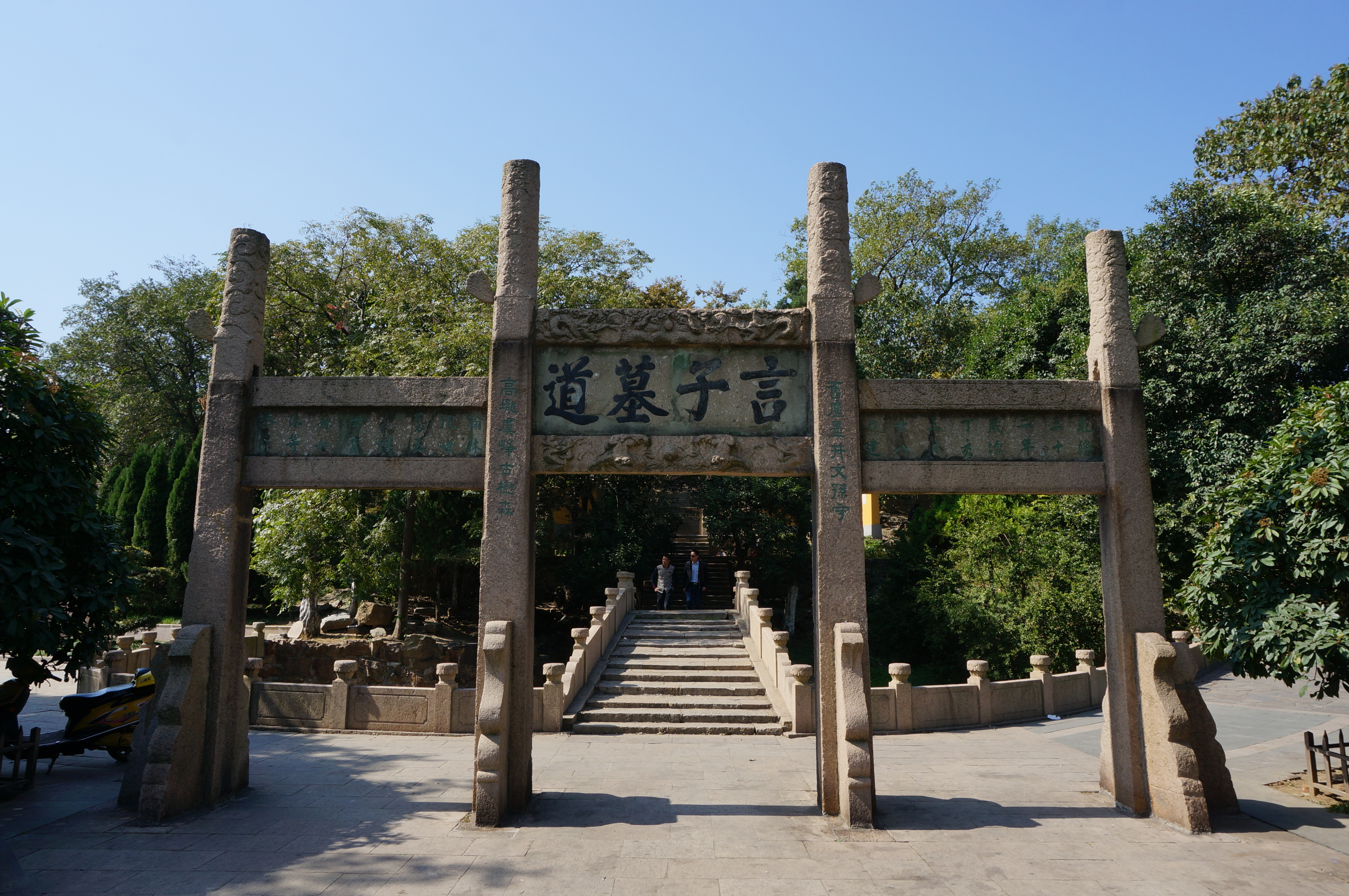
The first of three paifang of Yanzi's tomb

The tomb of Yan Yan (Chinese: 言子墓; pinyin: Yánzǐ Mù), a prominent disciple of Confucius, honorifically known as Yanzi (Master Yan), is located on Yushan, Changshu, Jiangsu Province, China. Yanzi was a native of Changshu. As a young man he went to the State of Lu where he studied under Confucius. Yanzi, hard-working and intelligent, excelled in literature. After finishing his studies, he returned to the south and became known as "Master of the South".

The tomb of Yanzi was established in the early Western Han dynasty for the first time. The tomb was enhanced over many generations. The entrance of the tomb faces Changshu Beimen Street. The ramp extends to the hillside which reaches 142 metres (466 ft). Chinese culture suggests that placing a tomb on a hillside increases its Feng Shui. There are three arches all with plaques and each arch has a pair of couplets. The ramp has three pavilions. The burial mound is about 1.6 metres (5 ft 3 in) high and 3.5 metres (11 ft) in diameter. Two tombstones, one of the Qing dynasty and another of the Ming dynasty, commemorate the tomb.

The tomb was given protection as a provincial cultural treasure in October 1956.
