= Changshu High School =

High school in Jiangsu, China

Changshu High School of Jiangsu Province 江苏省常熟中学

Location
- Changshu, Jiangsu, People's Republic of China

Information
- School type: high school
- Motto: (See body text)
- Founded: 1938
- Status: open
- Authority: Jiangsu Provincial Education Commission
- Website: www.jsscszx.com

Changshu High School of Jiangsu Province (Chinese: 江苏省常熟中学, or Shengshuzhong—Chinese: 省熟中—for short) is a high school located in Changshu, Jiangsu, People's Republic of China.

== History ==
The school was first founded in Sichuan in 1938. In 1946, it moved to Changshu and changed its name to Jiangsu Provincial High School of Changshu. And in 1953 it chose Changshu High School of Jiangsu Province as its name. In 1990, it was regarded as the first batch of qualified and key high schools by the Jiangsu Provincial Education Commission. In 2004, it was assessed as a four-star general high school of Jiangsu Province.

== Mottoes ==
- The school ethos is "Keep broad-minded and wise, learn practically". (Chinese: 校风：明理实学)
- The teaching style is "Keep strict, creative and devoted".(Chinese: 教风：严谨创新奉献)
- The style of learning is "Study by yourself, supervise by yourself, help by yourself". (Chinese: 学风：自学自治自强)

== Organization ==
The school consists of the general Party branch and the Principal room.

=== General Party branch ===
The general Party branch consists of:

- Party branch
- labor union
- Youth league committee
- student union.

=== Principal room ===
The Principal room is made up of

- the offices
- guidance department
- filing room
- office of moral education
- teaching research office
- general affairs department

== Honors ==
- Civilized Unit of Jiangsu Province
- Model School of Jiangsu Province
- Advanced Unit of moral education of Jiangsu Province
- Advanced Unit of Scientific Research of Suzhou
- Advanced Skeleton of Party of Suzhou
