= Changshu =

Changshu 常熟市
- County-level city
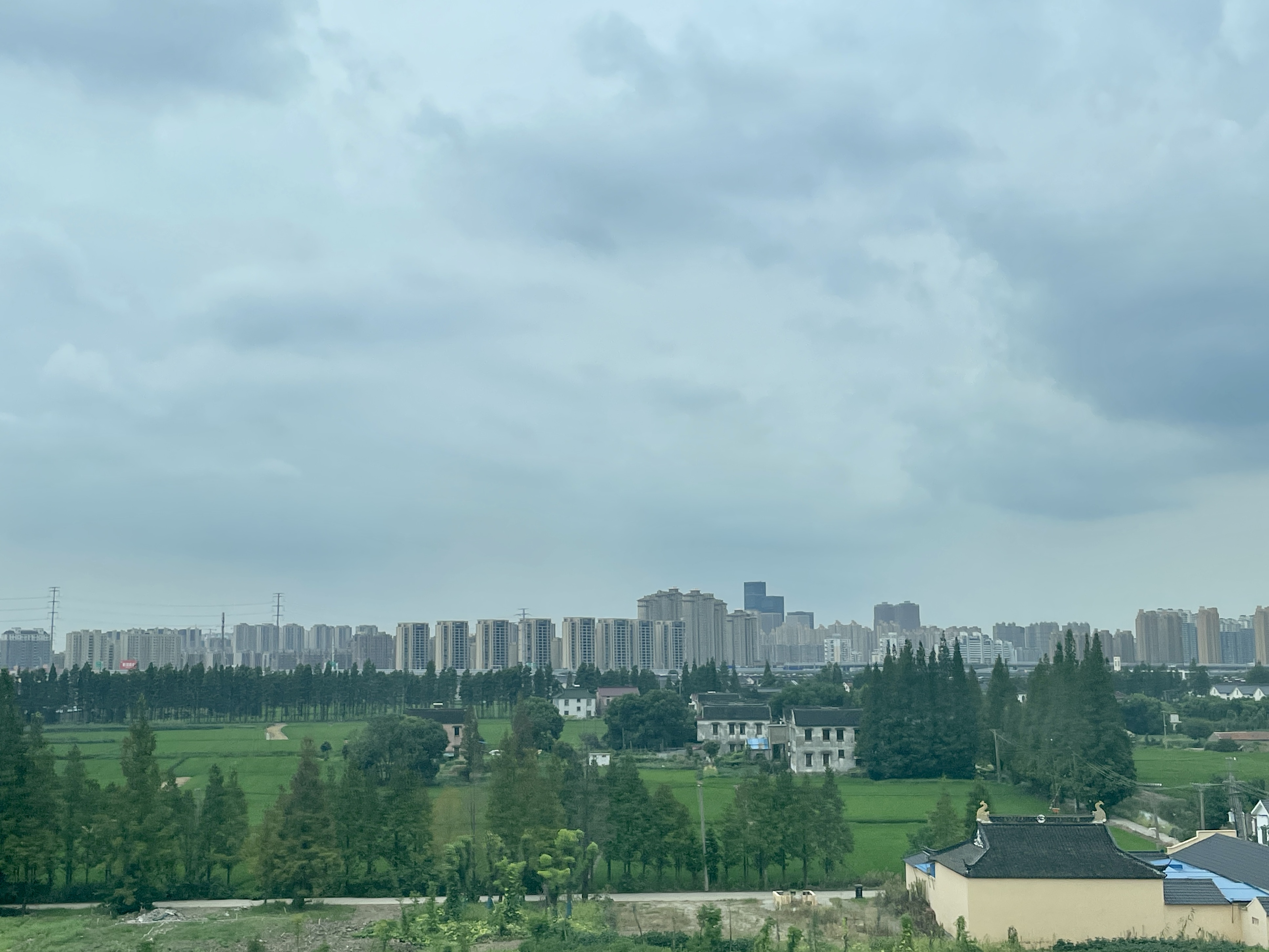
- Buildings in Changshu

- Location in Jiangsu
- Coordinates (Changshu government): 31°39′22″N 120°45′11″E
- Country: People's Republic of China
- Province: Jiangsu
- Prefecture-level city: Suzhou

Government
  - CPC Changshu Committee Secretary: Wang Xiang

Area
  - County-level city: 1,264 km^{2} (488 sq mi)

Population (2020 census)
  - County-level city: 1,677,050
  - Density: 1,327/km^{2} (3,436/sq mi)
  - Urban: 1,230,599
  - Rural: 446,451
- Time zone: UTC+8 (China Standard)
- Postal code: 215500
- Area code: 0512
- Website: changshu.gov.cn

Changshu (Chinese: 常熟; pinyin: Chángshú; Wade–Giles: Ch'ang-shu'; lit. 'evergrow'; Suzhounese: /d͡ʐan¹³ ʐoʔ²³/) is a county-level city under the jurisdiction of Suzhou, Jiangsu province, and is part of the Yangtze River Delta. It borders the prefecture-level city of Nantong to the northeast across the Yangtze River. Due to the mild climate and terrain, it has had a high level of agriculture since ancient times, and is named after this: the first character of its name (常) means "always, often", while the second (熟) means "ripe". The name of the adjacent county-level city of Taicang means "great granary".

== History ==
Changshu first became an independent county in 540 AD, but in 581 was made subordinate to Suzhou. It was promoted to seat of a full prefecture in 1295, was rebuilt and fortified in the 14th century, but in 1370 was reduced again to the level of a county. In the 15th and 16th centuries Changshu was several times attacked by Japanese pirates (wokou).

Changshu has traditionally been a market town for locally produced rice, corn, wheat, tea, and mulberry leaves, and since the 13th century has been a major cotton-producing district. Although administratively still a subordinate city to Suzhou, it is a provincial base of foreign trade. Currently a harbour is being developed on the Yangtze River near Changshu to service Suzhou and Wuxi.

== Economy ==
The city's major industries include textiles, paper-making, fine chemicals, machinery, steel and forestry products. The city has more than 4,000 textile and apparel companies with combined annual sales of RMB50 billion. The paper-making industry has attracted more the US$15 billion of FDI. By the end of 2007, this industry exceeded 2.4 million tons.

More than 2,000 foreign enterprises have invested in Changshu including big names such as Sharp and Dunlop. Of the contracted investment at least one-third has come from Taiwan – more than 500 Taiwan enterprises have invested more than US$100 million in the city. UPM-Kymmene from Finland has been running a paper mill in the city since 1999 and now has an annual capacity of 200,000 tons of coated and 600,000 tons of uncoated fine paper.

== Administrative divisions ==
Changshu is further divided into 2 subdistricts and 9 towns.

=== 2 Subdistricts ===
- Bixi (碧溪新区)
- Dongnan (东南开发区)

=== 9 Towns ===
- Yushan (虞山)
- Haiyu (海虞)
- Meili (梅李)
- Xinzhuang (辛庄)
- Guli (古里)
- Zhitang (支塘)
- Dongbang (董浜)
- Shajiabang (沙家浜)
- Shanghu (尚湖)

=== Discontinued/Merged towns ===
- Xushi (徐市)
- Heshi (何市)
- Renyang (任阳)
- Baimao (白茆)
- Tangshi (唐市)
- Xieqiao (谢桥)
- Dayi (大义)
- Mocheng (莫城)
- Wangzhuang (王庄)
- Yetang (冶塘)
- Liantang (练塘)
- Yangyuan (杨园)
- Zhangqiao (张桥)

== Climate ==
Climate data for Changshu, elevation 5 m (16 ft), (1991–2020 normals, extremes 1981–present)
Month	Jan	Feb	Mar	Apr	May	Jun	Jul	Aug	Sep	Oct	Nov	Dec	Year
Record high °C (°F)	21.5 (70.7)	26.2 (79.2)	32.0 (89.6)	33.1 (91.6)	35.6 (96.1)	37.3 (99.1)	39.1 (102.4)	38.9 (102.0)	36.5 (97.7)	32.6 (90.7)	27.2 (81.0)	22.0 (71.6)	39.1 (102.4)
Mean daily maximum °C (°F)	7.8 (46.0)	10.1 (50.2)	14.5 (58.1)	20.6 (69.1)	25.8 (78.4)	28.5 (83.3)	32.5 (90.5)	32.1 (89.8)	28.1 (82.6)	23.1 (73.6)	17.1 (62.8)	10.6 (51.1)	20.9 (69.6)
Daily mean °C (°F)	4.1 (39.4)	5.9 (42.6)	10.0 (50.0)	15.7 (60.3)	21.0 (69.8)	24.5 (76.1)	28.6 (83.5)	28.2 (82.8)	24.2 (75.6)	18.9 (66.0)	12.9 (55.2)	6.6 (43.9)	16.7 (62.1)
Mean daily minimum °C (°F)	1.2 (34.2)	2.7 (36.9)	6.4 (43.5)	11.7 (53.1)	17.1 (62.8)	21.4 (70.5)	25.5 (77.9)	25.4 (77.7)	21.1 (70.0)	15.3 (59.5)	9.5 (49.1)	3.4 (38.1)	13.4 (56.1)
Record low °C (°F)	−8.6 (16.5)	−7.1 (19.2)	−3.7 (25.3)	0.6 (33.1)	8.6 (47.5)	13.3 (55.9)	18.8 (65.8)	17.4 (63.3)	12.1 (53.8)	3.8 (38.8)	−2.1 (28.2)	−9.1 (15.6)	−9.1 (15.6)
Average precipitation mm (inches)	66.7 (2.63)	61.7 (2.43)	83.6 (3.29)	83.5 (3.29)	88.5 (3.48)	218.5 (8.60)	181.5 (7.15)	173.7 (6.84)	99.4 (3.91)	61.0 (2.40)	60.8 (2.39)	43.2 (1.70)	1,222.1 (48.11)
Average precipitation days (≥ 0.1 mm)	10.3	10.0	11.9	10.8	11.3	13.7	12.9	12.0	9.0	7.7	8.6	8.0	126.2
Average snowy days	2.9	2.0	0.6	0	0	0	0	0	0	0	0.2	0.9	6.6
Average relative humidity (%)	75	75	73	72	72	80	79	80	78	74	75	73	76
Mean monthly sunshine hours	115.1	118.1	140.2	162.3	170.7	127.1	187.1	188.9	159.4	159.2	130.5	131.4	1,790
Percentage possible sunshine	36	38	38	42	40	30	43	46	43	46	42	42	41
Source: China Meteorological Administration

== Infrastructure ==
The China National Highway 204 Yantai-Nantong-Changshu-Shanghai, Sujiahang Expressway and Suzhou-Jiaxing-Hangzhou all pass through Changshu. Changshu has one Yangtze River crossing, the Sutong Yangtze River Bridge, one of the longest cable-stayed bridges in the world.

== Education facilities ==
=== College and universities ===
- Changshu Institute of Technology (常熟理工学院)
- UWC Changshu China (常熟世界联合书院)

=== High schools ===
- Changshu High School of Jiangsu Province (江苏省常熟中学)
- High School of Changshu City (常熟市中学)
- Changshu Foreign Language School (常熟市外国语学校)
- United World College of Changshu China

== Tourism ==
=== Gardens and parks ===
- Fangta Tower Park (方塔园)
- Yushan Park (虞山公园)
- Shanghu Lake Park (尚湖公园)
- The Zengs' Garden (曾园)
- The Zhaos' Garden (赵园)
- The Yan Garden (燕园)

=== Hills ===
- Yushan (虞山)
- Fushan Hills (福山诸丘)
- Tongguan Hill (铜官山)
- Dianshan Hill (殿山)
- Xishan Hill (西山)

=== Archaeological sites ===
- Xingfu Temple (兴福寺)
- Zhongyong's Tomb (仲雍墓)
- Yanzi's Tomb

== Religion ==
Local people generally believe in Buddhism, Taoism, Protestantism and Catholicism. Changshu Christian Church is a Protestant church in the city.

== Transportation ==
- Railroad: the Yangtze Riverine Railway
- Highways: the Yangtze Riverine Expressway, the Suzhou-Jiaxing-Hangzhou Expressway

== Notable people ==
- Huang Gongwang (1269–1354), one of the Four Masters of the Yüan dynasty
- Pu Xuefeng (1900–1997), academic and administrator
- Shiwu (1272–1352), a Chan poet and hermit who lived during the Yuan Dynasty
- Wang Hui (1632–1717), one of the "Four Wangs" representing the orthodox school of painting during the Ming and early Qing dynasties
- Wu Li (1632–1718), one of the orthodox school of "literati painting" (wenrenhua) in the early Qing dynasty
- Jiang Tingxi (1669–1732), official painter and grand secretary to the Imperial Court
- Weng Tonghe (1830–1904), Confucian scholar and imperial tutor of two emperors during the Qing dynasty
- Wang Ganchang (1907–1998), nuclear physics scientist
- Zhang Guangdou (1911–2013), hydrologist

== See also ==
- List of twin towns and sister cities in China
