= Zhu Xian =

Zhu Xian or Zhuxian may refer to:

== Literature and media ==
- Zhu Xian (novel) (诛仙), 2005 Chinese novel by Xiao Ding
  - Jade Dynasty (video game), video game adaptation
  - Jade Dynasty (film), 2019 film adaptation

== Places in China ==
- Zhuxian, Henan (朱仙镇), in Kaifeng, Henan
- Zhuxian Township, in Wushan County, Chongqing

== See also ==
- Jade Dynasty (disambiguation)
