= Pu Xuefeng =

Chinese-born politician and academic (1900–1997)

Pu Xue-feng
- 浦薛鳳
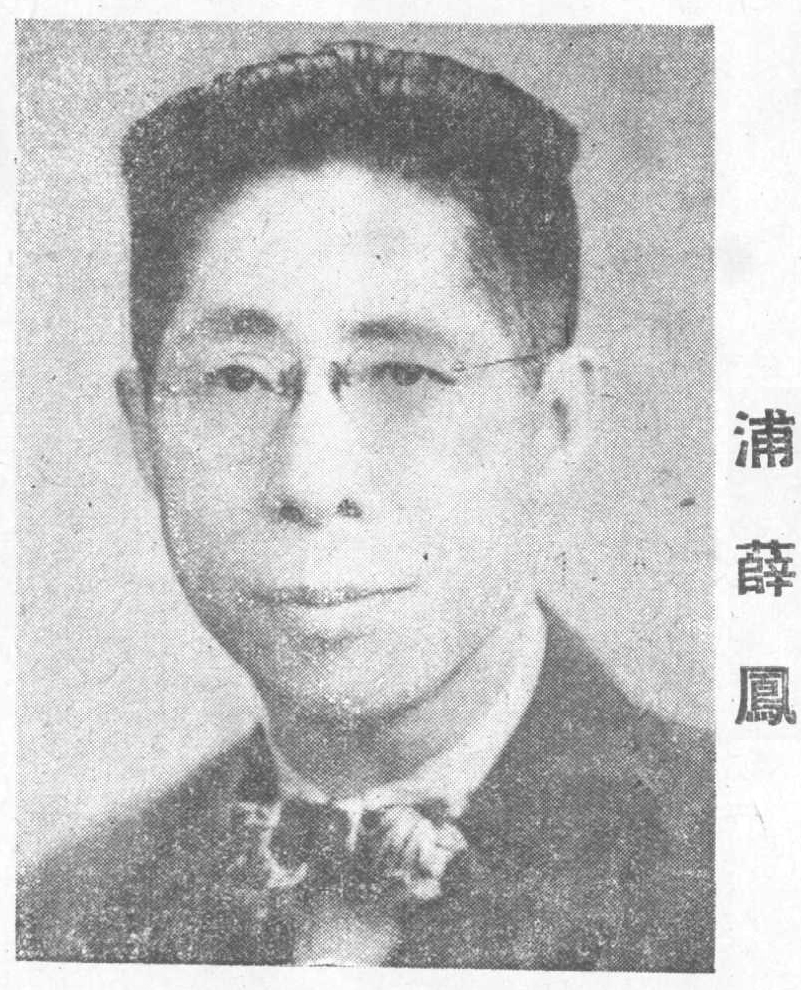

Personal details
- Born: 1900 Changshu, Jiangsu, China
- Died: January 7, 1997 San Gabriel, California
- Occupation: Politician, educator

Pu Xuefeng (Chinese: 浦薛鳳; 1900–1997), also known as Dison Hsueh-Feng Poe, was a Chinese political scientist and administrator. Born in 1900 in Changshu, Suzhou, China, he was educated at Tsinghua University in Beijing and Hamline University in Saint Paul, Minnesota, where he received a BA in 1923. He went on to graduate with a master's degree in political science from Harvard University. Subsequently, he taught at Tsinghua and other universities and entered government service with the Republic of China in 1938. During World War II, he served in the Supreme National Defence Council. He attended the United Nations Conference on International Organization in San Francisco in 1945 as a technical counselor for the Republic of China. He retired to California and died in San Gabriel, California, in 1997.
