= Xingfu Temple (Changshu) =

Buddhist temple in Changshu, Jiangsu, China

- 兴福寺
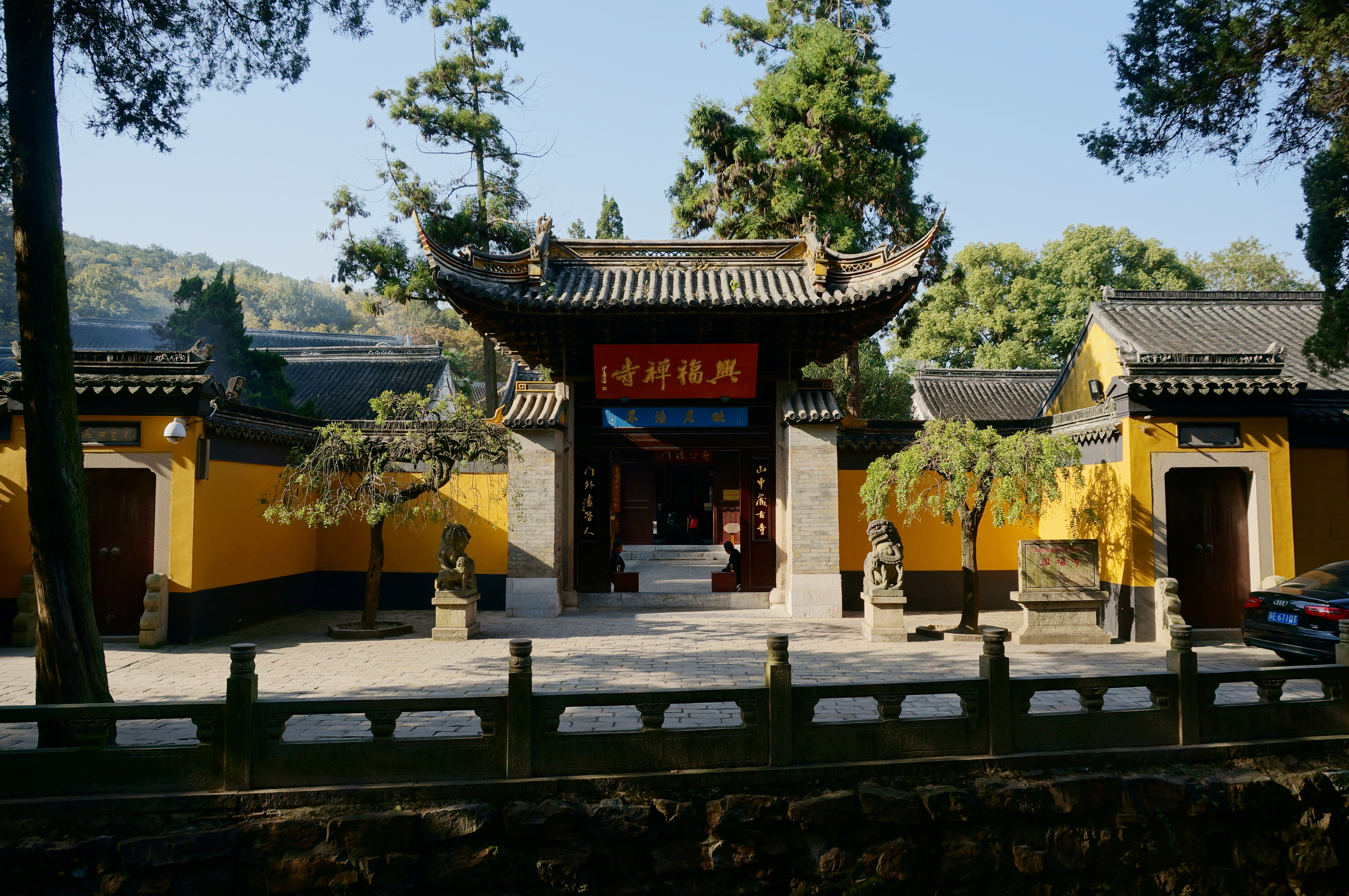
- The Shanmen at Xingfu Temple.

- Location within Jiangsu

Religion
- Affiliation: Buddhism
- Sect: Chan Buddhism
- Leadership: Shi Miaosheng (释妙生)

Location
- Location: Mount Yu, Changshu, Jiangsu
- Country: China
- Interactive map of Xingfu Temple
- Coordinates: 31°40′19″N 120°43′35″E

Architecture
- Style: Chinese architecture
- Founder: Ni Deguang (倪德光)
- Established: 494–502
- Completed: 1985 (reconstruction)

Website
- www.csxingfutemple.org

Xingfu Temple (simplified Chinese: 兴福寺; traditional Chinese: 興福寺; pinyin: Xīngfú Sì) is a Buddhist temple located at the foot of Mount Yu in Changshu, Jiangsu, China.

== History ==
The temple was first construction as "Dabei Temple" or "Temple of Great Compassion" (大悲寺) between 494 and 502 by prefectural governor Ni Deguang (倪德光), under the Southern Qi dynasty (479–502) of the Southern dynasties period.

It was largely extended in 539 and renamed "Fushou Temple" or "Temple of Blessing and Longevity" (福寿寺), during the reign of Emperor Wu of Liang dynasty (502–557). It was also called "Poshan Temple" (破山寺) because it sits along the Polong Stream (破龙涧).

In 868, in the 9th year of Xiantong period in the Tang dynasty (618–907), Emperor Yizong inscribed plaque with Chinese characters "Xingfu Chan Temple" (兴福禅寺) to the temple.

After the establishment of the Communist State in 1949, the local government renovated and refurbished Xingfu Temple several times. A renovation and rebuilding to the main building began in 1981 and was completed in 1985. Xingfu Temple has been designated as a National Key Buddhist Temple in Han Chinese Area by the State Council of China in 1983.

== Architecture ==
The existing main buildings include Shanmen, Mahavira Hall, Hall of Four Heavenly Kings, Hall of Guanyin, Bell tower, Drum tower, Hall of Guru, Dharma Hall, Huayan Pagoda, and Pagoda of Xingfu Temple.

== Culture ==
Chang Jian, (常建), a Tang dynasty poet lived in the mid-8th century, eulogized a poem "Writing on the wall of a hall at Poshan Temple" (题破山寺后禅院) after visiting the temple. The poem was inscribed to the Three Hundred Tang Poems by Qing dynasty scholar Sun Zhu. It is selected in China’s middle school Chinese textbook.
