= Mel Jade =

Australian singer and songwriter

Mel Jade is a singer and songwriter. She was born in Melbourne, Australia, and is half Dutch and half Australian.

Her first release, "Aliens", was a remix with Pretty Boys from Saint Tropez. The song was played by DJ Armin van Buuren on Radio 538 in the Netherlands and became a "dance smash". It charted in multiple European countries.

Jade announced that she was embarking on a solo project, and initially began releasing songs and videos online. The homemade music video for the song "We Could Make a Movie", which showed couples kissing, received over a million views on YouTube.

She released "Not That Serious", the first official single from her debut solo album, on 4 May 2013. She collaborated with Fashion TV, which aired behind-the-scenes shots of her music video for "Not That Serious", which featured multiple evening gowns.

Jade's debut album Alive was released on 5 August 2013 while she was touring the UK.

Upon her return to Australia, Jade was honoured as a "MusicOz Legend" at the 2013 Independent Music Awards where she also presented an award and performed.

On 14 January 2015, Jade released "Bliss", the first single from her upcoming second album.

== Discography ==
=== Albums ===
Title
Title	Album details
Alive	Released: 5 August 2013; Label: N/A; Format: CD, digital download
Dreamsick	Released: 1 July 2015; Label: Format: CD, digital download
