= Isobella Jade =

American author and essayist

Isobella Jade (born September 3, 1982) is an American author, essayist, and public relations professional. A former petite model and inspirational speaker and also works in public relations. She is known as one of the first people to do something notable inside an Apple store, typing her first draft of her manuscript Almost 5’4”, a modeling memoir, at the Apple Store on Prince Street in SoHo in New York City when she was 23 years old. Jade has been featured in The New York Times, The New York Post, The Los Angeles Times, The Sydney Morning Herald, Glamour, Allure, Mac Life, Mac World UK, Marie Claire UK and multiple other international fashion magazines and Apple culture magazines.

== Early life ==
Isobella Jade was born Heather Staub in Syracuse, New York. She attended Liverpool High School in Liverpool, New York, where she was a competitive track athlete. Despite her petite stature, Jade qualified for the Young Women's 400-meter dash at the 1999 Junior Olympics. She also qualified for the NYSPHSAA Boys & Girls Championship and ran in the Class A Girls 400 Meter Dash, recording a time of 62.30 seconds. Her personal bests include 60.9 seconds in the 400-meter dash and 1:41.1 minutes in the 600-meter dash.

Jade attended the New York Institute of Technologly (NYIT) on a track scholarship. She began pursuing a modeling career during her sophomore year at the school's Manhattan campus. After graduating from NYIT with her Bachelor of Science in Advertising, Jade continued to pursue both modeling and writing professionally.

== Author ==
Jade published her debut memoir book, Almost 5’4” , in June 2007 via Amazon's self-publishing platform, Booksurge. The New York Post described how Jade wrote her manuscript for Almost 5’4” at the Apple store with, “People have long cataloged the bizarre writing habits of authors, from P.G. Wodehouse pinning pages on his wall to Dan Brown timing his push-up and sit-up breaks with an hourglass. Now we can add the name Isobella Jade to that collection.” The New York Times also recognized her for using the Apple Store as a unique writing space, “As for Ms. Jade, whose modeling career is advancing, she has yet to buy a computer from the Apple store. But she is still welcome to check her e-mail — and stay as long as she likes.” In addition Macworld magazine described the book as, “a very readable, very revealing memoir that feels at times like you are peeking at someone's secret diary. It's possibly the only book ever to have been written entirely on the free Mac computers at a New York Apple Store. Part memoir, part inspirational guide, Almost 5'4" would make a good film, and likely the rather persuasive Isobella Jade would insist on playing the lead.” The Friday Project, an imprint of HarperCollins in the United Kingdom published an edition of Almost 5’4” in February 2010. Marie Claire UK shared Jade's raw account of being a shorter than average model and Jade shared with the magazine, “I love that modeling is not as much about being perfect as it is about having character.” In November 2009 Soft Skull Press published Jade's graphic novel Model Life: The Journey of Pint-Size Fashion Warrior. Model Life, illustrated by Jazmin Ruotolo, is a fictional graphic novel based on Jade's own adventures as a shorter model in New York City. Model Life involves many Internet-age elements and most of the communication between characters happens through social media and text messaging. The New York Daily News featured the book launch of Model Life and covered the book release party in SoHo, which showcased a live photo shoot of five petite shoe models. Allure magazine said that Model Life, “takes a brand-new approach to the story of a girl trying to break into the biz.” Jade is also the author of the Careful, Quiet, Invisible series, the first book of the series, Careful, launched July 26, 2012. While writing "Careful, Quiet, Invisible," Jade is working on a digital graphic novel series called Model Life.

== Publishing Company ==
Jade founded her own publishing company, Gamine Press on May 14, 2009. In June 2009, she republished Almost 5’4” under the imprint. In 2010, inspired by her blog readers, Jade published Short Stuff: On The Job with an X-small model, which provides career advice and modeling tips for shorter models.

In 2011, Gamine Press partnered with iVerse Comics to release a digital edition of the graphic novel Model Life: The Journey of a Pint-Size Fashion Warrior for iPhone and iPad.

Jade also authored the young adult (YA) novel Careful, Quiet, Invisible, published in 2012. The narrative centres on the spirit of a teenage girl who dies in a texting-and-driving accident. The book addresses contemporary social issues within the YA genre.

== Modeling ==
After graduating from college, Jade continued working as a print and parts model, specialising in hand and shoe modeling in Manhattan. Her early professional modeling work included a makeover feature for Woman's World magazine and modeling for Brown Shoe at the Fashion Footwear Association of New York shoe show. She has modeled shoes and worked as a foot model for Marshalls, Victoria's Secret, Bath & Body Works, Easy Spirit, Seventeen magazine and Whole Living magazine, among others.

Her hands appeared in a fall fashion commercial for Macy's, and she was hired multiple times for editorial work in Bon Appétit magazine. She also appeared as a body model on the Fashionably Late with Stacy London show on TLC and was featured as a parts model in Nylon magazine.

In addition, she has modeled and been featured in editorials for LUNA magazine (Milan), Bon Magazine (Sweden) and GQ (Italy).

== Social media ==
Along with promoting opportunities for petite models, Isobella Jade also advocates for aspiring models of all sizes seeking work in the modeling industry. Through her blog, podcast, and social media platforms, she shares guidance on finding opportunities and offers advice on how shorter girls can appear more proportioned in photographs.

== Blog ==
Isobella Jade wrote about the day-to-day experiences of working as a shorter model and offered advice on how aspiring models could find opportunities, regardless of height or location. She also shared fashion advice through her blog, (www.petitemodelingtips.com), which was launched in June 2007 and has since been discontinued

== Podcast ==
On September 27, 2007 Jade launched and hosted a top entertainment podcast on the Blogtalkradio network. Her show has received over one million downloads. On the podcast she dishes out tips and advice for models of all sizes. Past industry professionals she's interviewed include, fitness expert Gunnar Peterson and Fashion and Sports Illustrated Swimsuit photographer Steve Erle, Jewelry designer Kendra Scott, celebrated Fashion designer Bradley Bayou, along with beauty brands such as Lush (company), Origins, Wet n Wild, Styli-Style and others. All her segments all have an inspirational angle; she often shares self-publishing tips as well and hosts book readings.

== Public image and influence ==
Isobella Jade was known as one of the shortest working models in the United States before retiring from modeling. The Los Angeles Times noted, “Before Tyra was giving shorties hope on Cycle 13 of America's Next Top Model, Isobella Jade was already in their corner.”

Through her books and social media platforms, Jade has become a spokesperson for aspiring petite models of all ages. Media Bistro's Galleycat, described her as a self-promotion expert, based on the guidance she shared regarding marketing and brand building. She has spoken on panels at BookExpo America, the Self-Publishing Book Expo, the New York Round Table Writers' Conference, the Writers' League of Texas Agents and Editors conference, SiriusXM Book Radio, sharing her experiences as a self-made author while discussing strategies for marketing oneself and acting as one's own publicist on a budget.

In 2018, The New York Times published her essay reflecting on the death of her father.

== Personal life ==
Isobella Jade was married in 2010 and divorced in 2020.
