= Jade, Karnataka =

Jade
- village
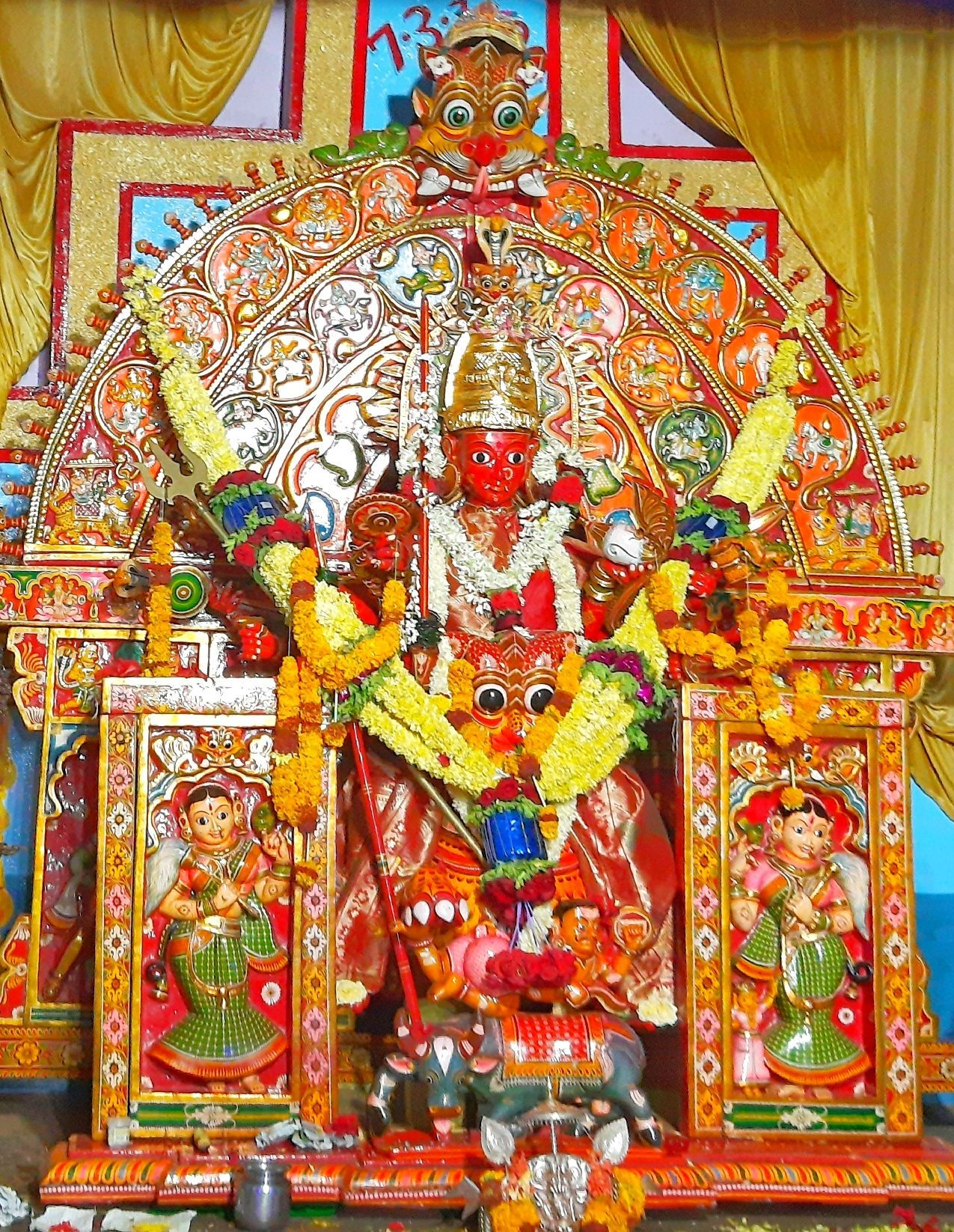
- Shri Marikamba Devi, Jade

- Location in Karnataka, India Jade (India)
- Coordinates: 14.5729°N 75.0472°E
- Country: India
- State: Karnataka
- District: Shivamogga
- Subdivision: Sagara
- Taluq: Soraba
- Region: Malenadu
- Nearest City: Sirsi

Government
  - Type: Gram panchayat
  - MP: B. Y. Raghavendra
  - MLA: Madhu Bangarappa

Population (2011)
  - Total: 2,485

Languages
  - Official: Kannada
  - Regional: Sirsi Kannada
- Time zone: UTC+5:30 (IST)
- Pincode: 577419
- Area code: +91-8184
- Vehicle registration: KA 31 Sirsi; KA15 Sagara

Jade is a village in Karnataka, located 30 km (19 mi) away from Sirsi.
