= Jadeite (disambiguation) =

Jadeite is one of the constituent minerals of the gemstone known as jade.

Jadeite may also refer to:

- Jadeite (character), a character in Sailor Moon media
- Jadeite (kitchenware), a jade-green coloured opaque milk glass used for kitchenware in the mid-20th century

== See also ==
- Jadite, a type of translucent green glassware or vaseline glass ware
