= Kyauksein Pagoda =

Buddhist pagoda in Myanmar

- ကျောက်စိမ်းစေတီ
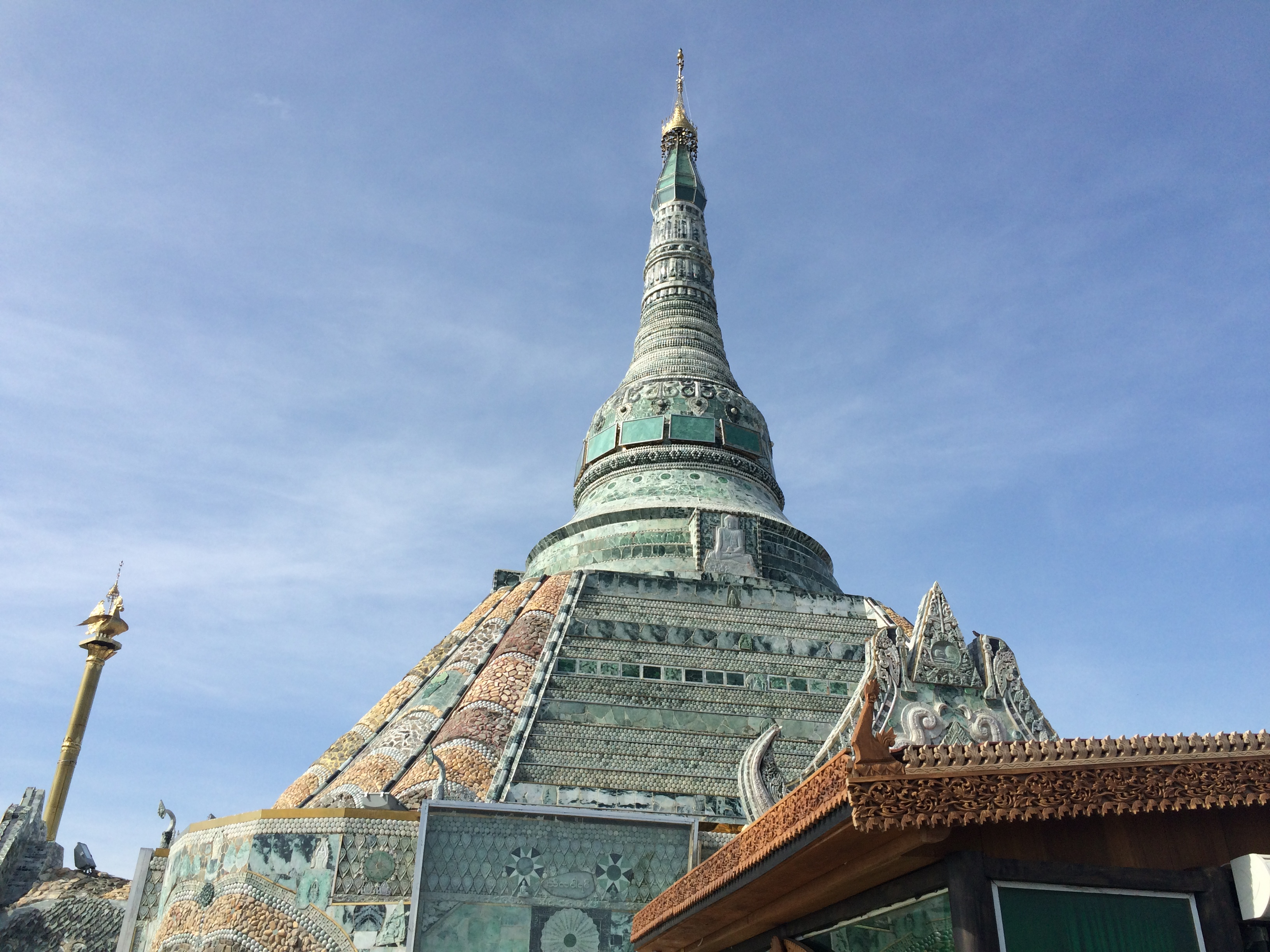

- Kyauksein Pagoda

Religion
- Affiliation: Theravada Buddhism

Location
- Country: Amarapura, Mandalay Region, Myanmar
- Coordinates: 21.857367°N 96.020154°E

Architecture
- Completed: 2015; 11 years ago

Kyauksein Pagoda (Burmese: ကျောက်စိမ်းစေတီ, lit. 'Jade Pagoda'), formally known as the Varocana Kyauksein Zedi (ဝေရောစန ကျောက်စိမ်းစေတီတော်), is a Buddhist pagoda located on the outskirts of Amarapura, Mandalay Region, Myanmar (Burma). The pagoda itself is covered with over 10,000 long tons (10,000,000 kg) of jade, rising to a height of 75 feet 6 inches (23.01 m), and is reputed to be the world's first jade pagoda.

The pagoda was erected by the jade mining family of Soe Naing and Aye Aye Khaing, who donated both the pagoda and pagoda grounds. Construction on the pagoda began in November 2012, and the umbrella-hoisting ceremony to inaugurate the pagoda was held on 5 June 2015.

== See also ==
- Buddhism in Myanmar
