= Yushan (Changshu) =

Hill in Changshu, Jiangsu, China

Yushan (Chinese: 虞山) is a hill located in the northwest of Changshu in Jiangsu Province, China. It is named after Yu Zhong, a government official who was buried in the hill during the Shang and Zhou dynasty. Yushan is 300 meters high and 6.5 kilometers long. It looks like a sleeping cow. Yushan is known for "Eighteen Scenery".

== Scenery ==
- The Snow on Book Set (书台积雪)
- Broken Hill Morning (破山清晓)
- Xin Feng Morning (辛峰夕阳)
- Kun Cheng Twin Towers (昆承双塔)
- Taoyuan Spring (桃源春霁)
- Wei Mo Sun Rising (维摩旭日)
- Jianmen Kistler (剑门奇石)
- Blowing Water (拂水晴岩)
- Qin Po Waterfall (秦坡瀑布)
- Ou Qu Fishing (藕渠渔乐)
- Fu Gang Tide (福港观潮)
- West Pavilion (西城楼阁)
- Puren Autumn (普仁秋爽)
- Star Altar Seven Juniper (星坛七桧)
- Lake Rain (湖甸烟雨)
- Lake Moon (湖桥串月)
- Wu Gu Maple Valley (吾谷枫林)
- Three Peak Green Pine (三峰松翠)

== Yushan Park ==
Yushan Park is located on the banks of Yangcheng Lake, Changshu. In 1982, it was listed as a national key scenic area – one of the most famous scenic areas within the Lake Tai scenic area. In 1989, Yushan Park was approved as a National Forest Park by the Ministry of Forestry.

=== Scenery ===
- Xingfu (兴福景区)
- Jianmen (剑门景区)
- Baoyan Ecological Sightseeing Garden (宝岩生态观光园)
- Xinfeng (辛峰景区)
- City Wall Ruins (城垣遗址)

== See also ==
- Yanzi's Tomb, located on Yushan
