= Jade Tree =

Jade tree may refer to:

- the jade plant, Crassula ovata
- the dwarf jade plant, Portulacaria afra
- Jade Tree (record label)
