= Jade Mountain Illustrating the Gathering of Scholars at the Lanting Pavilion =

Chinese jade sculpture

- Jade Mountain
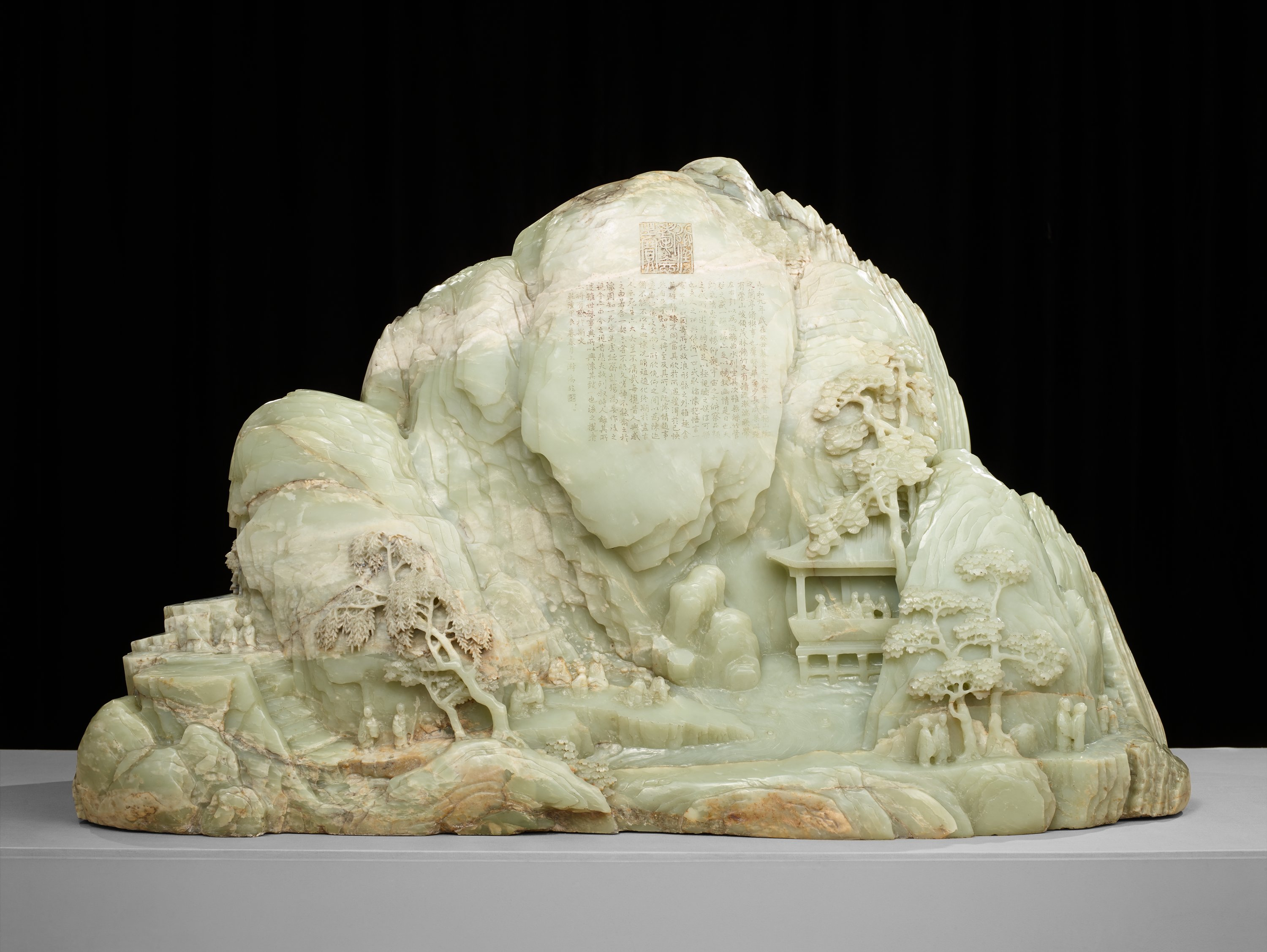
- Artist: Unknown
- Year: 1790
- Medium: Jade
- Dimensions: 22 1/2 × 38 3/8 in. (57.2 × 97.5 cm)
- Weight: 640 lb, 290 kg
- Location: Minneapolis Institute of Art, Minneapolis
- Owner: Minneapolis Institute of Art
- Accession: 92.103.13
- Website: https://collections.artsmia.org/art/4324/jade-mountain-illustrating-the-gathering-of-scholars-at-the-lanting-pavilion-china

Jade Mountain Illustrating the Gathering of Scholars at the Lanting Pavilion is a jade sculpture, made and most likely finished in 1790, in China. It measures 57.2 cm (22.5 in) high, 290.3 cm (114.3 in) long, and 97.7 cm (38.5 in) deep. This carving is from the Qing dynasty.

== History ==
Official Court Portrait of Qianlong Emperor (1711–1799)

This piece was made in 1790 during the Qing dynasty, which reigned from 1644 to 1912 and was the final imperial dynasty. It was made under the fifth emperor of the dynasty, Qianlong, who commissioned this sculpture, which “remains the largest jade carving outside of China”. During this period, China was deeply steeped in a respect for tradition. Over the years, society in China grew to be more conservative. Art was just as much about politics as it was about the opportunity to depict the beauty of creation.

According to the Minneapolis Institute of Art catalog, the sculpture was at some point taken out of China. It was brought to the United States by the diplomat Herbert G. Squiers. After Squiers' death, his possessions, along with the jade sculpture, were auctioned off. In 1912, Thomas Barlow Walker (1840–1928), the founder of the Walker Art Center, bought Jade Mountain at the auction for US$4,000 (the equivalent of $133,000 in 2022). According to the catalog, it was one of his most prized possessions, and for many years a centerpiece in his house. Tim Gihring describes a photograph of the Jade Mountain so used: "Undated photograph, likely from around 1915, shows the sculpture atop a tablecloth, surrounded by dinnerware and flowers." According to Gihring, Walker started Minnesota's first art gallery in his own home, and this jade carving was next displayed there. In fact, Walker had an entire salon just for jade alone, where Jade Mountain was displayed among many other pieces. He was an avid collector of Asian art and sought to share his collection with his community. Much of the art that Walker had collected over his lifetime eventually became part of "Mia" (the Minneapolis Institute of Art), including Jade Mountain.

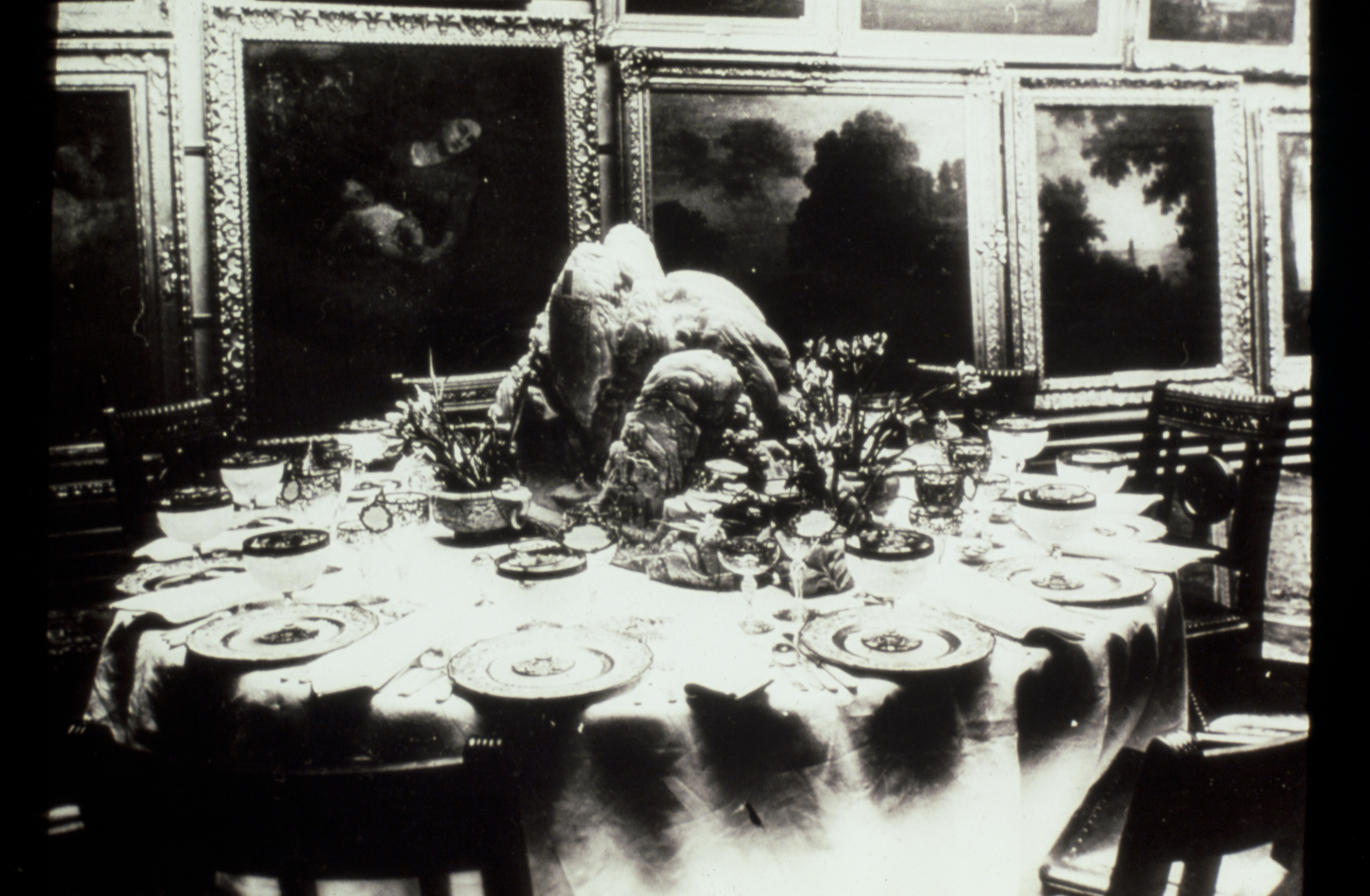
1915 Jade Mountain

== Description of Jade Mountain ==
Jade Mountain 2020

The Jade Mountain sculpture is a large, oddly shaped piece of jade, with almost jagged edges. This is a sculpture in the round, meaning every part of the stone has been carefully carved. The center is covered in Chinese writing, as well as what looks like the royal seal. The sculpture appears to depict a mountain, including trees and a stream running along the bottom of the sculpture. It also includes what looks like a pagoda with little human figures that may be praying, depicting a scene from Asian culture. On the right of the carving, men in a circle may be praying or meditating. At a higher point on the mountain, there are some steps leading down to the river. By the river, there appear to be two men, one with a pointed stick, under some willow or pine trees. To the left and right there are more men who are talking or praying beside the river. On the far left, there seem to be men and perhaps women, who may be hugging or kissing.

=== Spirit of Jade Mountain ===
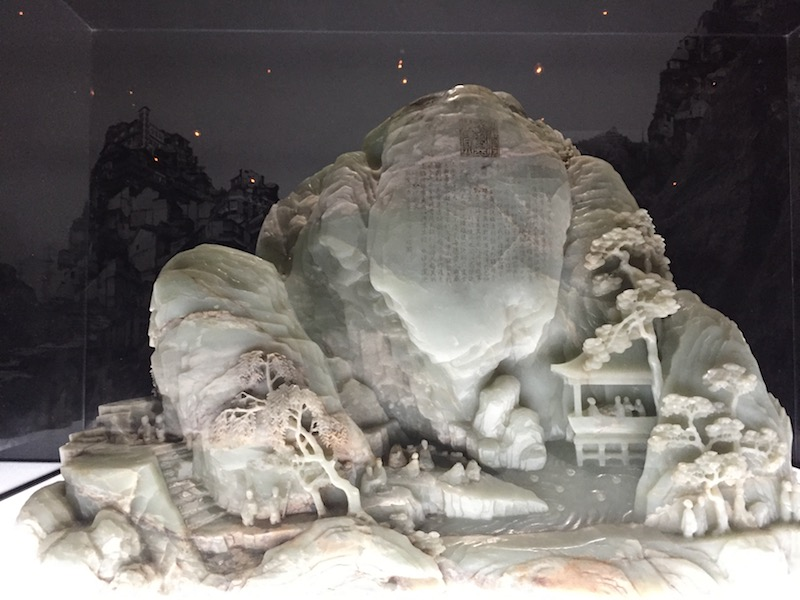
jade mountain 2018

Jade has historically been used in much Chinese, Japanese, and Korean art. Jade has long been very important to Chinese culture, with multiple symbolic meanings. According to the Minneapolis Institute of Art, it represents "tranquility and harmony of otherworldliness and the longing of the cultivated individual to escape the mundane world to commune with nature." In Chinese culture jade represents purity, beauty, longevity, and immortality. Historically, jade was thought to have magical properties and was believed to grant its owner immortality. Jade was hard to find in China, and its rarity may help explain its popularity as a gemstone. Expert carvers were also rare, as working with jade was a very challenging and specialized skill. As a result, jade carvings were a sign of wealth and status.

== Poem ==
This jade carving depicts a famous scene in Qing Dynasty history. In its center, it tells the story about a historical event called the Spring Purification Festival, which during the Qing dynasty took place on the third day of the third lunar calendar month. A group of people (most likely nobles and wealthy people) would go out to enjoy nature by the river. This was a day for fun as well as celebration, enjoying meals by the water. At some point, the people would dip their hands in the water to help prevent bad luck. It is said that during one of these celebrations, a very memorable event occurred. There was a “drinking contest”, when people sent wine goblets floating down the winding creek, everyone cheering along on the bank. Whenever a cup stopped, the man closest to the cup was required to drink it and then write a poem. According to event records, 36 poems were composed. To commemorate this day, the calligrapher Wang Xizhi wrote an introduction to the poems collected on the Jade Mountain carving. Wang was particularly renowned for his cursive script and was also a highly esteemed scholar of the time. According to the Minneapolis catalog, 41 scholars along with Wang went to this festival. The festival and the poems created during this event helped inspire many scholars and artists alike.

== The calligraphy ==
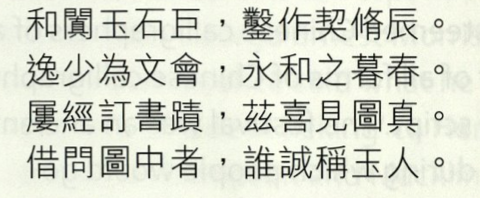
poem

According to the Minneapolis Institute of Art, some of the Chinese writing on this carving translates to this:

This lump of jade from Khotan was large, it was carved to illustrate a gathering at the Spring Purification Festival. Elders and youth alike congregated at this literary meeting, it was in the Yonghe reign, and the final month of spring. Often the calligraphy [of Lanting Xu] is scrutinized over its authenticity, I enjoy the genuineness of the picture of jade. One cannot help but ask, among those depicted in the scene, who is worthy of the name ‘jade being’?

This text was written by the Qianlong Emperor, who chose a jade carving because China was seen as old and hard as jade, as well as strong and powerful. The poem on this sculpture was published not just on the carving but also in a collection of poems and essays. The emperor was happy to see the symbolism of the jade carving, done in part to celebrate his 80th birthday. The jade carving could have been seen as a statement that the emperor's reign was almost immortal.

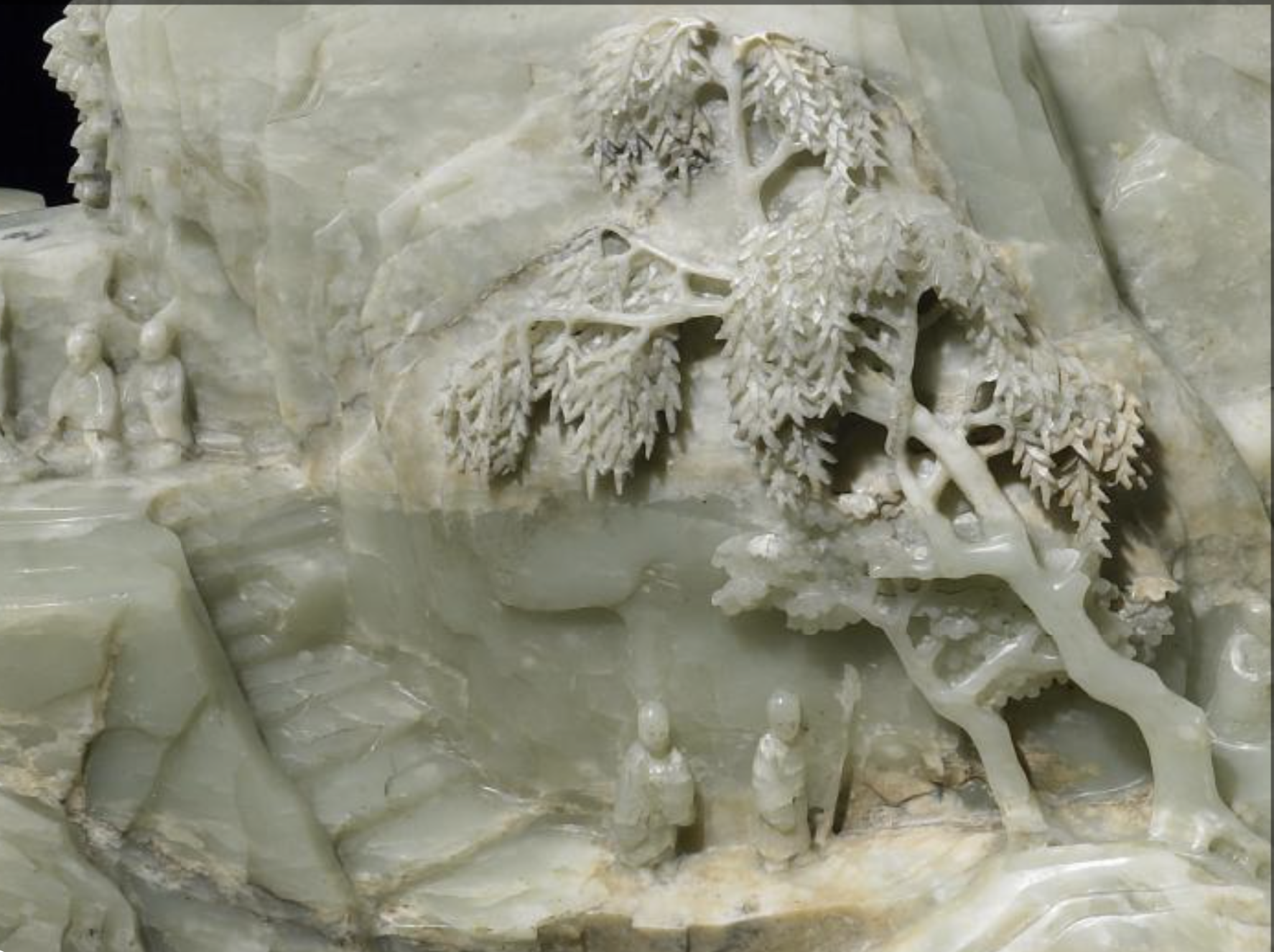
close up on right side of carving

Something unique to Chinese art is that an art work often includes text that explains its significance. This is written in semi-cursive script. The jade carvings script explains that Jade Mountain depicts a scene from the city of Shaoxing.

=== Text translation ===
This translation of the text describes the events of the Orchid Pavilion Gathering and is in the documents from the Orchid Pavilion Gathering. The text is written by Lantingji Xu and is a rare example of poems of the time, as well as of how Chinese text looked like back then. By reading Xu and the Emperor's text, we can get an idea of how the festival worked and what it looked like.

永和九年，歲在癸丑，暮春之初，	In the ninth year of Yonghe, at the beginning of the late spring,
會于會稽山陰之蘭亭，修禊事也。	we have gathered at the Orchid Pavilion in the North of Kuaiji Mountain for the purification ritual.
群賢畢至，少長咸集。	All the literati, the young and the old, have congregated.
此地有崇山峻嶺，茂林修竹；	There are high mountains and steep hills, dense wood and slender bamboos,
又有清流激湍，映帶左右。	as well as a limpid flowing stream reflecting the surrounding.
引以為流觴曲水，列坐其次；	We sit accordingly by a redirected stream with floating wine goblets.
雖無絲竹管絃之盛，	Although short of the company of music,
一觴一詠，亦足以暢敘幽情。	the wine and poems are sufficient for us to exchange our feelings.
是日也，天朗氣清，惠風和暢。	As for this day, the sky is clear and the air is fresh; the mild breeze greets us.
仰觀宇宙之大，	I look up at the immense universe.
俯察品類之盛；	I look down at myriad works [of poetry].
所以遊目騁懷，足以極視聽之娛，信可樂也。	As our eyes wander, so do our minds too. Indeed, it is a pure delight for all our senses.
夫人之相與，俯仰一世，	Acquaintance will quickly span a lifetime.
或取諸懷抱，晤言一室之內；	Some would share their ambitions in a chamber;
或因寄所託，放浪形骸之外。	others may indulge into diverse interests and pursuits.
雖趣舍萬殊，靜躁不同；	The choices are plenty and our temperaments vary.
當其欣於所遇，暫得於己，怏然自足，	We enjoy the momentary satisfactions when pleasures regale us,
不知老之將至。	but we hardly realize how fast we will grow old.
及其所之既倦，情隨事遷，感慨係之矣。	When we become tired of our desires and the circumstances change, grief will arise.
向之所欣，俛仰之間，已為陳跡，	What previously gratified us will be in the past,
猶不能不以之興懷；	we cannot help but to mourn.
況修短隨化，終期於盡。	Whether life is long or short, there is always an end.
古人云：	As the ancients said,
「死生亦大矣。」	"Birth and death are two ultimate events."
豈不痛哉！	How agonizing!
每覽昔人興感之由，若合一契；	Reading the past compositions, I can recognize the same melancholy from the ancients.
未嘗不臨文嗟悼，不能喻之於懷。	I can only lament before their words without being able to verbalize my feelings.
固知一死生為虛誕，	It is absurd to equate life and death,
齊彭殤為妄作。	and it is equally foolish to think that longevity is the same as the short-lived.
後之視今，	The future generations will look upon us,
亦猶今之視昔，	just like we look upon our past.
悲夫！	How sad!
故列敘時人，錄其所述；	Hence, we record the people presented here today and their works;
雖世殊事異，	Even though time and circumstances will be different,
所以興懷，其致一也。	the feelings expressed will remain unchanged.
後之覽者，亦將有感於斯文。	Future readers shall also empathize with the same by reading this poems collection.

=== Pieces inspired by Lanting Pavilion ===
Jade Mountain was created in honor of the Orchid Pavilion Gathering, an event that inspired many poets and artists of the time and continued to inspire Chinese poets, artists, philosophers and scholars for many generations to come. Besides Jade Mountain Illustrating the Gathering of Scholars at the Lanting Pavilion, other works made after this event include Gathering at the Orchid Pavilion, Xiao Yi Trying to Swipe the Lanting Scroll, Song, Juran – Xiao Getting the Orchid Pavilion Scroll and Wang Xizhi's Lantingji Xu by Feng Chengsu (馮承素),

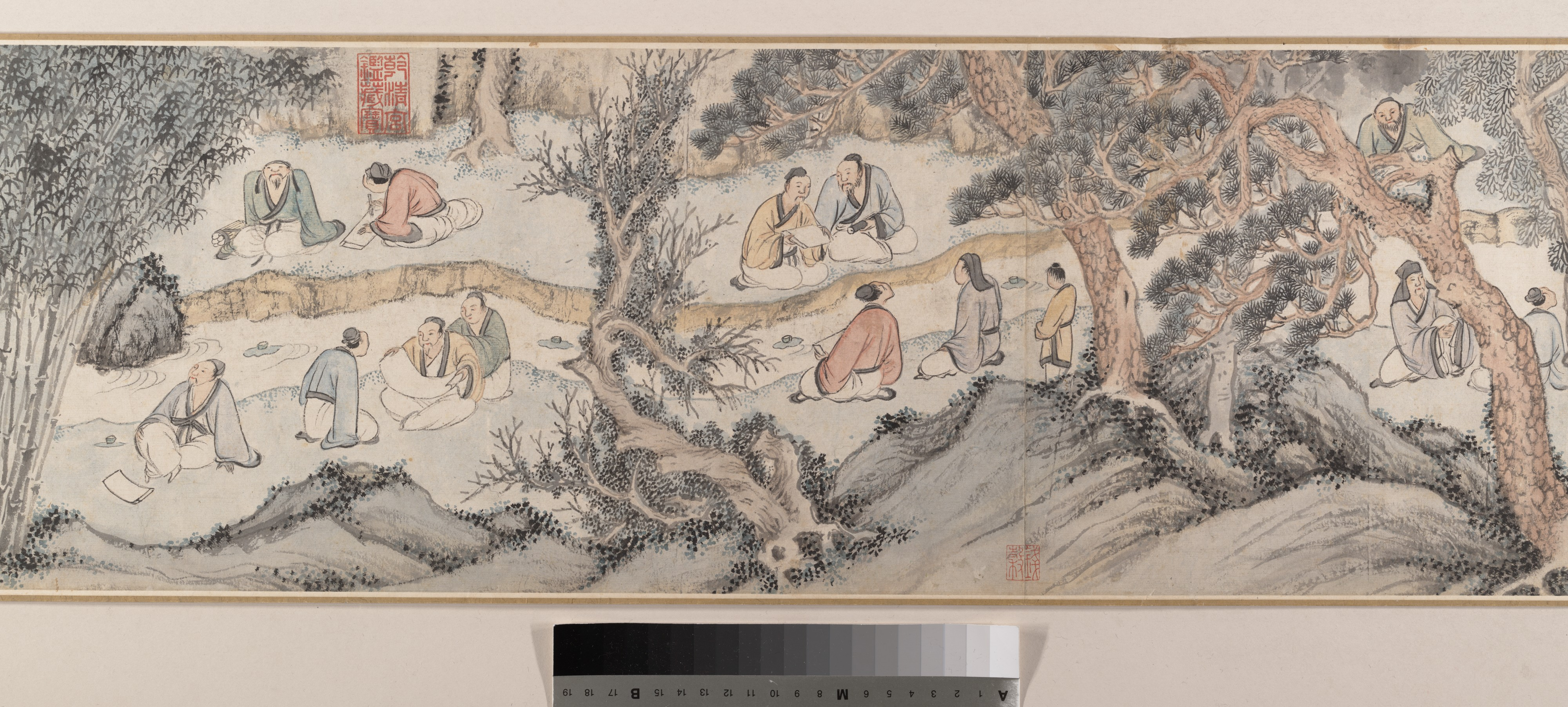
明 錢榖 蘭亭修禊圖 卷-Gathering at the Orchid Pavilion MET

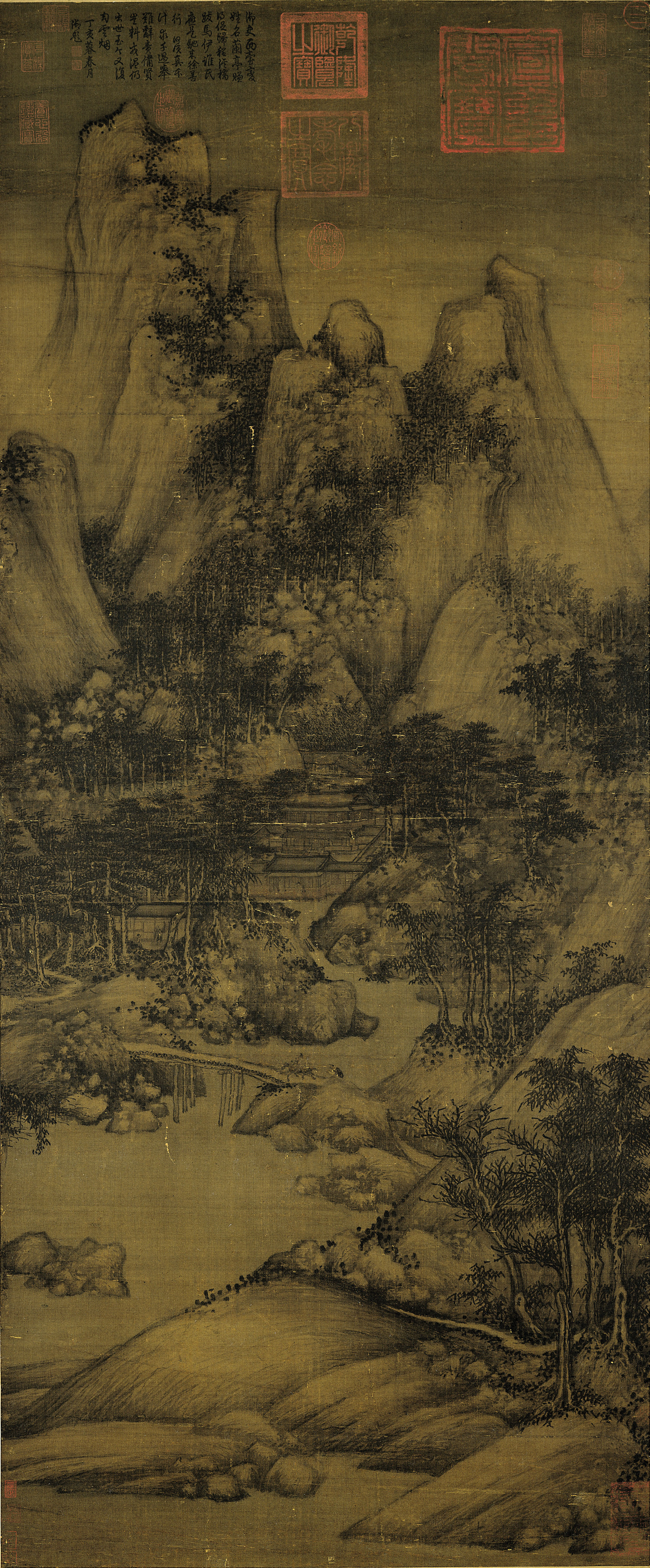
Juran – Xiao Getting the Orchid Pavilion Scroll

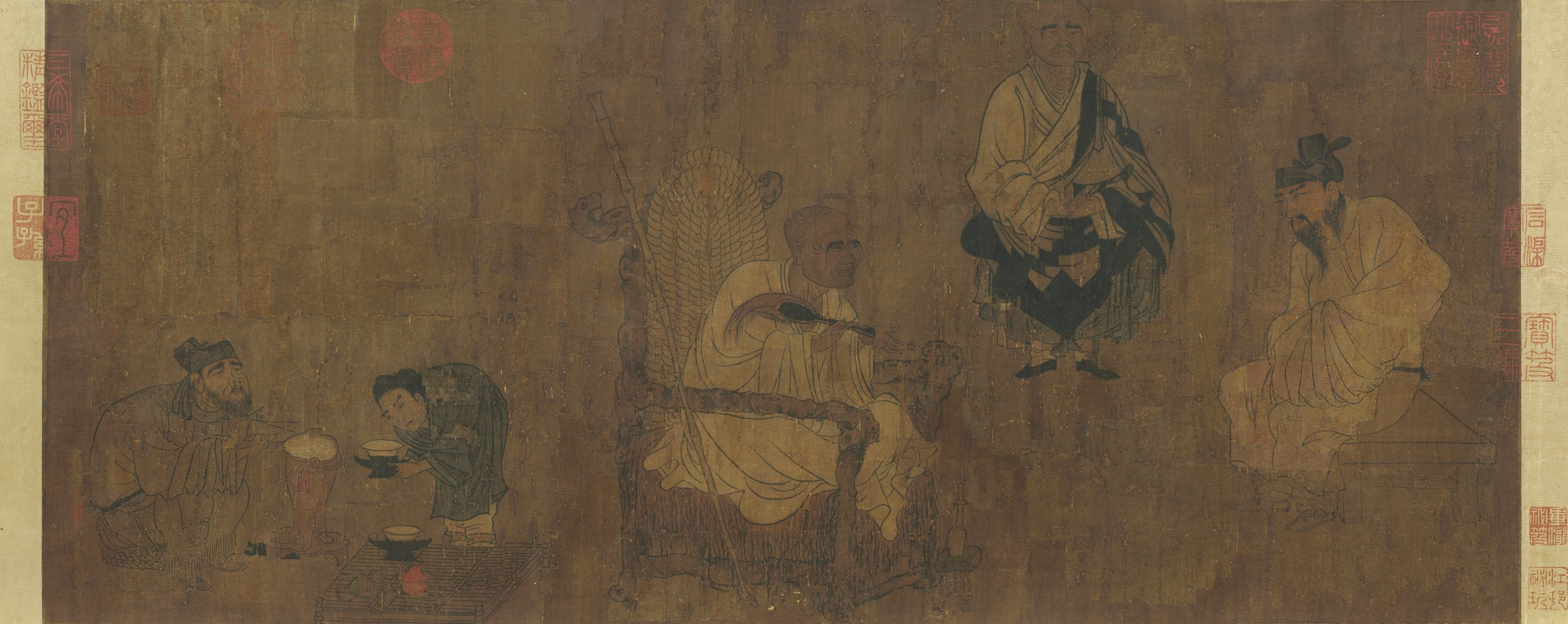
Xiao Yi Trying to Swipe the Lanting Scroll, Song (960–1279) copy of a Tang original painting.

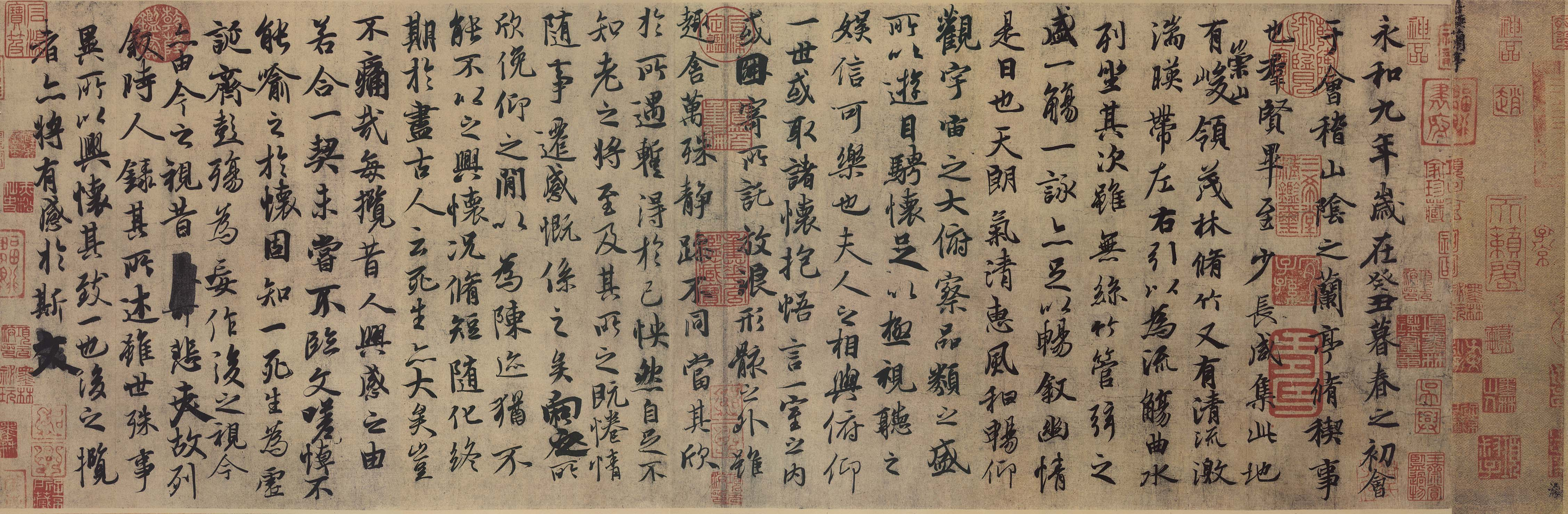
Main text of an early Tang Dynasty copy of Wang Xizhi's Lantingji Xu by Feng Chengsu (馮承素), in the Palace Museum, Beijing. This is considered the best surviving copy. Many copies in Chinese history were made from a lost original possibly buried in Taizong's mausoleum
