= Jade Dynasty =

Jade Dynasty may refer to:

- Zhu Xian (novel) or Jade Dynasty, a Chinese novel
  - Jade Dynasty (video game), adapted from the novel
  - Jade Dynasty (film), adapted from the novel
- Sparkle Roll, formerly called Jade Dynasty, a Hong Kong manhua publishing company

== See also ==
- Zhu Xian (disambiguation)
