= Srivani Jade =

Indian classical vocalist

- Born: Srivani
- Genres: Hindustani classical music
- Occupation: singer
- Years active: 1998 onwards
- Website: http://www.srivanijade.com

Srivani Jade is an Indian classical vocalist.

== Notable recordings ==
- Night by Night—Khayals in Jogkauns and Sohni
- Salagvarali and Audav Bageshree—Khayals
- Meera's Love
- Bhoopali and Rajasthani Maand
- Bhaktidarshana Tukayache (Marathi Abhangs of Sant Tukaram)

== Awards and recognitions ==
- 2012: Individual Artist Project grant from 4Culture (Project title: “Raag-rang: A Musical Interpretation of Modern Indian-Style Miniature Paintings.”)
- 2009: “Meera's Love” was nominated for Best Album at 10th Annual Independent Music Awards in the World Music category
- 2009: Fellowship Award from Washington State Arts Commission.
- 2009: Recording grant from Jack Straw Productions for project on the spiritual love songs of the 16th century mystic, Meera Bai.
- 2009–10: Washington State Arts Commission Master-Apprentice grant (Khayal).
- 2008–09: Washington State Arts Commission Master-Apprentice grant (Thumri).
