= USS Jade =

Patrol vessel of the United States Navy

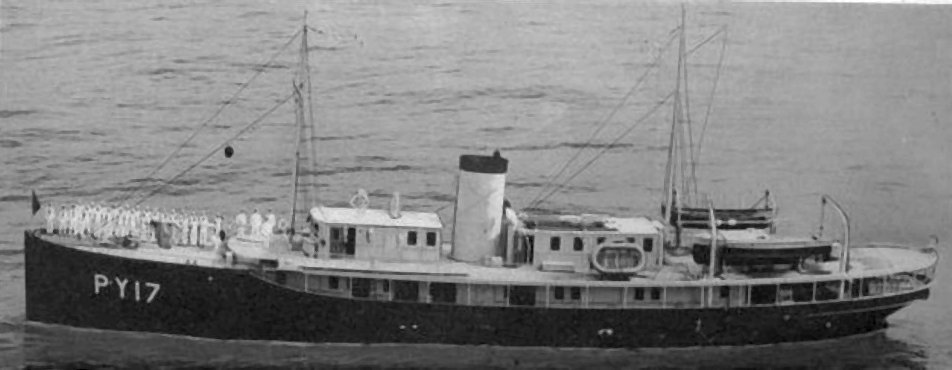
- USS Jade (PY-17)

History

United States
- Name: Athero II (1926–1928); Caroline (1928–1938); Doctor Brinkley (1938–1941)
- Owner: Jesse Lauriston Livermore (1926–1928); Eldridge R. Johnson (1928–1937); Joseph M. Schenck (1937–1938); John R. Brinkley (1938–1940)
- Builder: George Lawley & Son, Neponset, Massachusetts
- Yard number: 976
- Laid down: 1926
- Completed: 1926
- Identification: Official number: 225885; Signal letters: MGFJ; Signal letters: KLQE
- Fate: Acquired by the Navy, December 1940

United States
- Name: Jade
- Namesake: Jade
- Acquired: December 1940
- Commissioned: 16 March 1941
- Decommissioned: 11 February 1943
- Renamed: Jade, 16 March 1941
- Refit: Charleston Navy Yard, Charleston, South Carolina
- Fate: Transferred to Ecuador, under the Lend-Lease Program, 24 May 1943

Ecuador
- Name: Jade
- Acquired: 24 May 1943
- Fate: Returned to US Navy custody, 29 January 1944

United States
- Name: Jade
- Commissioned: 29 January 1944
- Decommissioned: 6 April 1944
- In service: 6 April 1944
- Out of service: 30 December 1944
- Stricken: 19 January 1945
- Identification: Hull symbol: PY-17; Code letters: NBFH
- Fate: Transferred to the Maritime Commission (MARCOM) for disposal, 12 January 1946
- Renamed: Sold in 1947, and renamed Santa Maria
- Fate: Sunk in 1948, off of Guam

General characteristics
- Type: Yacht (1926–1940); Patrol Yacht (1940–1945)
- Tonnage: 582 GRT
- Displacement: (Note: DANFS apparently used GRT rather than displacement as number is identical.)
- Length: 171 ft (52 m) oa; 160 ft (49 m) pp
- Beam: 27 ft 6 in (8.38 m)
- Draft: 13 ft (4.0 m)
- Installed power: 2 × Cooper-Bessemer diesel engines; 1,600 bhp (1,200 kW)
- Propulsion: 2 × screws
- Speed: 14 kn (26 km/h; 16 mph)
- Crew: 25 as yacht; 26 Navy
- Armament: (In US Navy service); 1 × 3 in (76 mm)/50 caliber gun; 2 × depth charge tracks; 4 × .30-caliber (7.62-millimeter) Lewis machine guns

USS Jade (PY-17), was a yacht in commission in the United States Navy as a Patrol Yacht from 1940 to 1945. The vessel was constructed as the yacht Athero II for Jesse Lauriston Livermore in 1926, then sold to Eldridge R. Johnson to be renamed Caroline until replaced by a much larger vessel, also named Caroline, in 1931. The smaller yacht was sold to Joseph M. Schenck of Los Angeles and New York, briefly, before being sold John R. Brinkley, M.D. of Del Rio, Texas, and renamed Doctor Brinkley. In 1940, the US Navy purchased her and renamed her Jade, after the ornamental mineral jade; she is the only Navy ship to bear this name.

== Construction ==
Athero II was designed by Henry J. Gielow, and built in 1926, by George Lawley & Son, Neponset, Massachusetts, as hull number 976 for Jesse Lauriston Livermore, of New York.

The yacht, at 582 GRT, had a length of 160 ft (49 m) between the perpendiculars, with an overall length of 170 ft (52 m). She was 27.5 ft (8.4 m) in breadth and depth of 16.5 ft (5.0 m) with official number 225885 and signal letters MGFJ. The yacht's hull was divided by four watertight bulkheads into five compartments. (Note: There are various measurements of length and even for the same basis of measurement variances in method. Length overall is the usual Navy basis, with the registered length being from the fore part of the outer planking at the stem to stern or rudder post, greater than length between perpendiculars and less than overall length .) Athero II had a crew of twenty-five.

On the berth deck forward were crew's quarters, including six staterooms aft of the bunk space with a galley and wardroom aft of the staterooms. An access stairway on the port side led to a lobby and to the central passageway for the crew spaces. Owners and guest spaces were aft of the machinery space with the owners stateroom and associated spaces, including bathroom, occupying the full width of the yacht. A centrally located door opened onto the passageway and lobby at the base of the starboard stairs giving access from the main deck. Two staterooms with connecting bath lay on each side of the central passage with another large stateroom and bath at the aft end of the passage.

On the main deck was an 80 by 20 ft (24.4 by 6.1 m) deck house covered by the deck above the full width of the yacht so as to provide a sheltered promenade deck extending from the forecastle to the sheltered afterdeck. The 24 by 18 ft (7.3 by 5.5 m) dining room occupied the forward portion. Aft of the dining room were quarters and pantry for the steward with a dumb waiter to the galley below. Aft of the steward's space was a 25.5 by 20 ft (7.8 by 6.1 m) living room. Above the deck house was the pilot house with further owner and guest spaces.

In the machinery space were two 800 hp (600 kW) Bessemer diesel engines, less compressors, weighing 99,000 lb (45,000 kg), started and reversed by compressed air from three single stage compressors. Electrical power was by a 50 hp (37 kW) Bessemer Diesel engine driving a 40 kW (54 hp) generator. Both the crew's and owner's spaces were ventilated by forced air circulation passing over hot water coils for heating or sea water coils for cooling. A Brunswick-Kroschell type refrigeration plant was installed for refrigeration and the production of ice.

== Yacht history ==
By January 1928, the yacht had been sold to Eldridge R. Johnson, and renamed Caroline. (Note: This was the first of two large motor yachts Johnson named for his mother. The second was the 1,839 GRT, 278 ft 11 in (85.01 m) yacht, sometimes seen as Caroline II, that became the Navy motor torpedo boat tender USS Hilo (AGP-2).) The yacht was replaced in 1931, by the 1,839 GRT, 171 ft (52 m) long second Caroline (sometimes seen as Caroline II). Johnson retained ownership of the first vessel into 1937, when it was sold to Joseph M. Schenck, of Los Angeles and New York, and assigned the new signal letters KLQE. The yacht was sold to John R. Brinkley, M.D., of Del Rio, Texas and renamed Doctor Brinkley with Galveston, Texas, as home port by the publication of the 1938–1939 register.

== Navy service history ==
Doctor Brinkley was purchased by the Navy in December 1940, and overhauled and converted for Navy use at Charleston Navy Yard. She was renamed Jade and commissioned at Jacksonville, Florida, 16 March 1941.

Jade was assigned to the 6th Naval District, performing inshore patrol work, until departing Charleston, for the Canal Zone, 5 May 1941. There she performed patrol duties for Panama Sea Frontier until 11 February 1943, when she arrived Salinas, Ecuador, for transfer to that country under the lend lease program. After a training period for her new crew, Jade was turned over to Ecuador, 24 May 1943.

The ship was returned to US custody, in exchange for Turquoise, 29 January 1944. Arriving San Francisco, she was decommissioned and was placed in service 6 April 1944, for use as a hulk at the Dry Dock Training Center, Tiburon, California. She was eventually placed out of service 30 December 1944, and returned to the Maritime Commission (MARCOM) 12 January 1946.

== Fate ==
Doctor Brinkley is shown as being out of documentation in 1947. The vessel, renamed Santa Maria, capsized and sank northeast of Guam, 24 November 1948.
