= Wipeout Québec =

Canadian French-language game show

- Genre: Game show
- Created by: Matt Kunitz; Scott Larsen
- Presented by: Valérie Simard
- Narrated by: Alain Dumas; Réal Béland
- Country of origin: Canada
- Original language: French
- No. of seasons: 1
- No. of episodes: 30

Production
- Executive producers: Matt Kunitz; Scott Larsen
- Production locations: Buenos Aires, Argentina
- Running time: 30 minutes
- Production company: Media Ranch

Original release
- Network: V
- Release: 31 August 2009

Related
- Wipeout (U.S.); Wipeout Canada; Total Wipeout

Wipeout Quebec (known as Wipeout in Quebec) is a Canadian French reality game show in which multiple contestants compete in numerous obstacle-based challenges. It aired on V. The series premiered on 31 August 2009. The show doesn't currently air new episodes. The series is an adaptation of the American original Wipeout. Unlike the original version which is a one-hour episode, the Quebec version is divided into three 30-minute episodes, issued during the week to "increase the suspense".

== Concept ==
Two hundred participants were chosen by Quebec production among the 18,500 entries received to participate in the course of Wipeout and only 200 people were chosen to play the game. In each episode, 24 Quebecois candidates participating in Wipeout and through several tests. There is only one winner per episode, who would.

== Course ==
Each episode, 24 participants from French-speaking Canada undergo a series of obstacle courses, and those who manage to make it past the round.

=== The Scanner ===
The twelve remaining candidates are perched on poles in a circle about four feet in height. A horizontal motorized bar starts rotating, passing over the poles. The candidates must jump to avoid it, and test continues, the more the bar rotates faster and it rises.

A candidate has the right to grab the pole if it is unbalanced, but he/she must stand up on the pole before the bar does not switch back to its level.

The final six contestants standing make it to the next round, but the test continues until there is only one candidate remaining.

=== The Wipeout Zone ===
First, applicants must go down a slide, a length of 45 feet before reaching the pool. Second, they must reach a slope where they have to go over rolling drums of 50 kg . Then they must pass through the "wall of rain", where participants have to make their way to the other end of the narrow ledge, with small rocks fixated on the adjacent wall for contestants to grip on, as gallons of water flow down the wall, impeding the contestants' balance.

The candidate then must jump on a turnstile consisting of giant poles arranged around a wheel, in which the candidate must hold. On the other side is a small platform on which to jump to continue. Then contestants must make their way to the beam, a beam that turns around on itself. If the candidate is dropped, he/she must go on the platform again and repeat the process, but the beam does not turn.

Finally, the candidate must jump on two trampolines, the second being located higher than the first. The candidate must push a button on the final platform to stop the timer.

The candidate who finishes the course in the shortest amount of time will be declared the champion of Quebec's Wipeout.
