= Wipeout in the Zone =

2011 video game

- Developer: Behaviour Santiago
- Publisher: Activision
- Series: Wipeout (game show)
- Platform: Xbox 360
- Release: June 14, 2011
- Genre: Party
- Modes: Single-player, multiplayer

Wipeout in the Zone is a party video game based on the American game show named Wipeout, made for the Xbox 360 with the Kinect. The game was published and distributed by Activision.

== See also ==
- Wipeout (2008 game show)
- Total Wipeout
- Wipeout Canada
- International versions of Wipeout
- List of Kinect video games
- List of Xbox 360 games
- Lists of video games

=== Related video games ===
- Wipeout: The Game
- List of video games based on Wipeout (2008 U.S. game show)
