= Talk Soup =

US television program

- Genre: Comedy
- Presented by: Greg Kinnear; John Henson; Hal Sparks; Aisha Tyler
- Narrated by: Beau Weaver
- Country of origin: United States
- Original language: English
- No. of seasons: 11

Production
- Producers: Aileen Gram Moreno; Alex Duda; Angela Gordon; Mark Tye Turner; Stan Evans; Jeff Zimmer; Bob Taylor; Brad Gyori; David Bernstein; Gregg Cannizzaro; Lara Kierlin; Ben Cheng; Heather Stewart; Tom Greenhut
- Running time: 22 minutes

Original release
- Network: E!
- Release: January 7, 1991 – May 17, 2002

Related
- The Soup

Talk Soup is a television show produced for cable network E! that debuted on January 7, 1991, and aired until May 2002. Talk Soup aired selected clips of the previous day's daily talk shows—ranging from daytime entries like The Jerry Springer Show to celebrity interview shows like The Tonight Show—surrounded by humorous commentary delivered by the host. Although Talk Soup poked fun at the talk shows, it also advertised the topics and guests of upcoming broadcasts. Despite this, several talk shows, including The Oprah Winfrey Show, refused to allow clips of their shows to be shown on the series. During its run, Talk Soup was nominated for five Daytime Emmy Awards, winning once in 1995 for Outstanding Special Class Program. A show based on it, The Soup, aired from 2004 to 2015.

The show frequently poked fun at actors Randolph Mantooth and Mario Van Peebles. Also featured was a womanizing Argentine sock puppet named Señor Sock that had bought several ThighMasters because he was madly in love with Suzanne Somers.

== Hosts ==
- Greg Kinnear (1991–1995)
- John Henson (1995–1999)
- Hal Sparks (1999–2000)
- Aisha Tyler (2001–2002)

The show had number of guest hosts over the years, including Roseanne Barr, Brad Garrett, Juliette Lewis, Patrick Warburton, Sarah Silverman, Suzanne Somers, Jon Hamm, Julia Sweeney, Kevin Nealon, Robert McRay, David Brenner, Crow T. Robot, Jennifer Love Hewitt, Jerry Springer, Adam Carolla, Dr. Drew Pinsky, Jimmy Kimmel, Tom Arnold, Roger Lodge, Catherine O'Hara, Teri Garr, David Spade, Donna D'Errico, Richard Lewis, George Hamilton, Wayne Brady, Rolonda Watts, French Stewart, Sally Jessy Raphael, and Kato Kaelin.

== Episodes ==
In 1993, the show was part of an episode of the CBS show 48 Hours with Dan Rather. The program was about the proliferation of talk shows on the TV landscape and featured a behind-the-scenes segment with the Talk Soup staff and host Kinnear.

Later that same year, the show taped a series of shows at the Disney/MGM Studios at Walt Disney World in Orlando, Florida. It was the first time the show was done in front of a live studio audience. During its run at Disney, the show premiered Talk Soup: The Motion Picture. Technically not a feature film but rather a grand trailer, it included Kinnear running in the middle of a crowded Wilshire Boulevard, throwing a staffer off the top of the E! building and being run over by a car in front of E! personality Arthel Neville.

Talk show guests were not the only ones the show skewered. Footage of Sylvester Stallone's mother, Jackie Stallone, eating shrimp at an event covered by E! News was comic fodder for the show.

Celebrities who appeared in sketches and walk-on appearances include Eric Idle, David Duchovny, Danny Aiello, Montel Williams, Adam West, Jonathan Harris, Neil Norman and his Cosmic Orchestra, Florence Henderson, Danny Bonaduce, Phil Hartman, Joan Collins, Billy Barty, George Foreman, Sugar Ray Leonard, Kristi Yamaguchi, Scott Hamilton, Ed Asner, Sherman Hemsley, Soupy Sales, Gary Coleman, Jenna Jameson, Robin Givens, Dawn Wells, The Moffatts and the cast of Mystery Science Theater 3000.

== Awards ==
The show won a Daytime Emmy Award for Outstanding Special Class Program in 1995; it received five Daytime Emmy nominations in all.

== The Soup ==
In 2004, E! leveraged the Talk Soup brand by renaming and reformatting The What The? Awards to create the show known today as The Soup with actor Joel McHale as host and co-writer, which aired until December 18, 2015.

One remnant from Talk Soup that carried over to The Soup is the Chat Stew segment which shows clips from various talk shows and funny comments. The segment is introduced with a CGI crock pot filled with talk show logos and host heads, while a woman (announcer Kelly Andrews) voices about the "stew" being "so meaty!"

On an episode of The Soup in January 2009, John Henson, a former host of Talk Soup, appeared as a guest star to promote his show, Wipeout. Aisha Tyler has also appeared on The Soup, claiming she wanted to "see the old studios."

The Soup has been mistakenly referred to as Talk Soup by Jean Bice, Mickey Rourke, Beth Koller and many others in the media.
