= Wipeout Australia =

Australian game show

- Genre: Game show
- Based on: Wipeout by: Matt Kunitz; Scott Larsen
- Presented by: James Brayshaw; Josh Lawson; Kelly Landry
- Country of origin: Australia
- Original language: English
- No. of seasons: 1
- No. of episodes: 8

Production
- Production locations: Buenos Aires, Argentina
- Production company: Endemol Southern Star

Original release
- Network: Nine Network
- Release: 3 February – 24 March 2009

Wipeout, presented on air as Wipeout Australia, is an Australian game show, which is based on the American game show of the same name. The game show premiered on the Nine Network on Tuesday 3 February 2009 at 7:30 pm for an initial run of eight episodes. The show was produced by Endemol Southern Star.

== Production ==
Potential contestants had to fill out a 14-page application and attend auditions in Sydney, which were held on 2 August 2008. The 160 successful contestants then participated in the filming of the series over a period of one week starting 2 October 2008 at the international Wipeout obstacle course, located in Buenos Aires, Argentina. Post-production began in Sydney in November 2008.

== Presenters ==
On 8 September 2008, it was announced that Kelly Landry has been given the on-location reporter role on the show. She is the only one of the three presenters to actually talk with contestants and observe their attempts to complete the various stages of the Wipeout course.

James Brayshaw, a sports presenter for the Nine Network, and actor Josh Lawson were announced as the two co-hosts on 26 November 2008. Brayshaw and Lawson provide commentary from within a studio setting.

== Format ==
Wipeout Australia's format follows that of its American forerunner, although the initial number of contestants who compete in the first (Qualifier) round is 20, rather than 24. Thus only eight competitors do not advance, rather than the half who are eliminated in the US show. Most of the competitors dress up in a costume and act like they are that person.

The twelve fastest competitors to complete the Qualifier advance to the Sweeper round, wherein they attempt to maintain their balance on a 3m-high metal pole while a rotating "Sweeper" arm tries to unseat them. After six players fall into the water, the remaining six advance; the sweeper arm continues to rotate however, with the last contestant standing winning a A$1,000 bonus.

The remaining six contestants then compete in the Dizzy Dummy round, where they are spun on the titular dummy and then required to navigate a short assault course. One player advances, and the remaining contestants are re-spun until the four finalists have been selected.

The dizzy dummy had been replaced with the Dreadmill, where contestants must try to walk through the treadmill to complete certain task with obstacles.

These four enter the Wipeout Zone, and attempt to complete the major final course in the fastest time. The winner is awarded A$20,000 in prize money.
