= The John Henson Project =

Television series

- Presented by: John Henson
- Country of origin: United States

Original release
- Network: Spike TV
- Release: 2004

The John Henson Project is an American reality television series that explores the world through the eyes of host John Henson. The series was shown on Spike TV in 2004. The intent of the show was to create a half-hour variety-type program that would highlight news, entertainment and sports from a "guy"'s perspective, punctuated by Henson's sardonic sense of humor. (Once known as The Nashville Network and, later, The National Network, Spike's programming was directed primarily at adult men.) The show would feature regular segments like "Cruise the News", "Guys and Balls" (sports recap) and "Man of the Week" (usually saluting a particularly foolish or unlucky individual in the news). More bizarre features were "Could I Kick His Ass?", where Henson would handicap himself, Vegas-style, in theoretical fights with celebrities and reenactments of famous sports tirades performed by grade school aged children.
