= Wipeout (2008 game show) =

American television game show (2008–2014)

Coordinates: 34.3761°N 118.4113°W

- Also known as: Winter Wipeout; Spring Wipeout; Summer Wipeout; Total Wipeout USA
- Genre: Competition; Comedy
- Created by: Matt Kunitz; Scott Larsen
- Directed by: J. Rupert Thompson
- Presented by: John Anderson; John Henson; Jill Wagner; Vanessa Lachey
- Composers: Vanacore Music (theme song and underscore)
- Country of origin: United States
- Original language: English
- No. of seasons: 7
- No. of episodes: 130

Production
- Executive producers: Matt Kunitz; Scott Larsen; Kevin Wehrenberg; Trice Barto; J. Rupert Thompson
- Running time: 42–44 minutes
- Production companies: Endemol USA; Lock and Key Productions; Pulse Creative

Original release
- Network: ABC
- Release: June 24, 2008 – September 7, 2014

Wipeout is an American television game show that features contestants competing in (what was billed as) the "World's Largest" obstacle course which originally aired on ABC from June 24, 2008, to September 7, 2014. In 2021, the show was rebooted on TBS, with John Cena, Nicole Byer, and Camille Kostek as hosts.

The show was originally hosted and commentated by John Henson and John Anderson, while Jill Wagner acted as the "on-location" reporter. The interim reporter for one season was Vanessa Lachey. The creators and executive producers are Matt Kunitz and Scott Larsen. Distribution of the show was handled by Endemol Shine. The show was taped at Sable Ranch in Canyon Country, California, north of Los Angeles.

== History ==
Wipeout title card used from 2008 to 2010. The logo can still be seen around the course until Seasons 6–7.

The series premiered on June 24, 2008, on ABC. After the pilot was shot, color commentator Elon Gold was replaced. Producers called in Michael Glazer to find a "comic host replacement" that eventually went to John Henson. The first season's success spawned a series of international versions of Wipeout, debuting in countries including the United Kingdom and Argentina in January 2009.

On December 8, 2008, ABC announced plans to counter-program NBC's Super Bowl game-day telecasts with a sports-star-studded episode of Wipeout, entitled "Wipeout Bowl". The episode was broadcast immediately following the game. The episode featured female cheerleaders competing against male "couch potato" sports fans. During the hour-long special, Monica Kaufmann became the show's first female competitor to win. Following the episode, an announcement was made that a second season had been commissioned, and a promo for the season was subsequently broadcast.

The second season was broadcast during the summer of 2009. According to TV Week, in 2009, Wipeout became the third most popular game show in the world, based on ratings. On July 22, 2009, Wipeout was renewed for a third season, for which filming began in September 2009.

The third season of the show premiered on June 22, 2010 with a special two-hour "Blind Date" episode preluding the series on June 1. ABC subsequently announced that other themed episodes would appear in Season 3, including episodes featuring ladies only and families. The third-season finale aired on September 14, 2010 with a special "America's Finest" edition, featuring some of America's heroes, including firefighters and policemen.

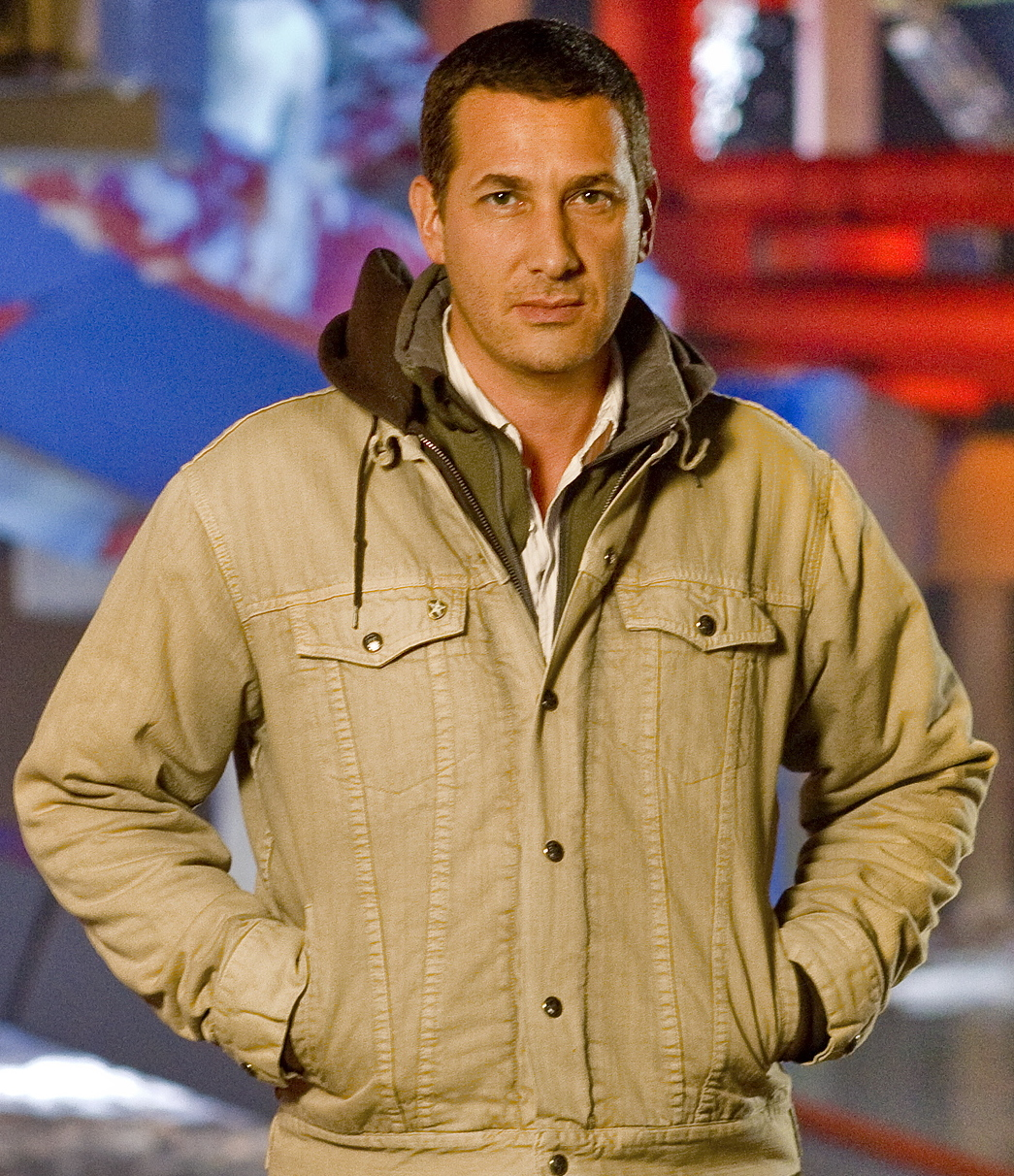
Co-creator and executive producer Matt Kunitz on the Wipeout Zone part of the course in 2010

On August 15, 2010, ABC announced that the show had been contracted for a fourth season. The announcement added: "Wipeout has the distinction of being the only broadcast reality series launched in recent years that has demonstrated proven staying power." On October 13, 2010, ABC announced plans that the fourth season would be split into three sections – Winter, Spring, and Summer; with a total of 31 episodes: 8 Winter episodes, 7 Spring episodes and 16 Summer episodes. The fourth season premiered on January 6, 2011.

On June 16, 2011, ABC announced that the show had been renewed for a fifth season and that Vanessa Lachey would replace sideline reporter Jill Wagner on the show. New episodes of Winter Wipeout began on December 8, 2011, with a Christmas special episode entitled Winter Wipeout: Deck the Balls. That same year, syndicated reruns of Wipeout aired on truTV and TBS.

On August 29, 2012, Wipeout was picked up for a sixth season. In addition, it was announced that former sideline reporter Jill Wagner would be returning to the series after a season-long absence. John Anderson and John Henson also returned as commentators. Vanessa Lachey departed the series due to her impending pregnancy.

On August 30, 2012, Activision released a Wipeout game for iOS. It quickly became the top-selling app in the App Store.

On May 9, 2013, season six premiered. In its sixth season, Wipeout celebrated its 100th episode.

For its seventh season, winners from each episode were brought together for a "Tournament of Champions" at the end of the season to compete for the title of Ultimate Wipeout Champion. Season seven ended on September 7, 2014.

Reportedly revamped for an eighth season as Wipeout Extreme, the show was quietly canceled by the summer of 2015 and removed from the network website. The series was not renewed for an eighth season. In the years since, the show has been seen on local stations, TeenNick and TBD.

== Hosts ==
Hosts of Wipeout, by ABC season and role
Season	Play-by-play	Color commentator	Sideline reporter
1	John Anderson	John Henson	Jill Wagner
2	John Anderson	John Henson	Jill Wagner
3	John Anderson	John Henson	Jill Wagner
4	John Anderson	John Henson	Jill Wagner
5	John Anderson	John Henson	Vanessa Lachey
6	John Anderson	John Henson	Jill Wagner
7	John Anderson	John Henson	Jill Wagner

=== TBS reboot ===
In April 2020, it was announced that the series would be returning on TBS. In September 2020, John Cena, Nicole Byer, and Camille Kostek were announced as hosts of the rebooted Wipeout. It premiered on April 1, 2021. On May 19, 2021, it was announced that the reboot series was renewed for a second season. One notable controversy occurred on November 18, 2020, when contestant Michael Paredes lost consciousness after falling from the show’s obstacle course and then died the next day.

== Gameplay ==
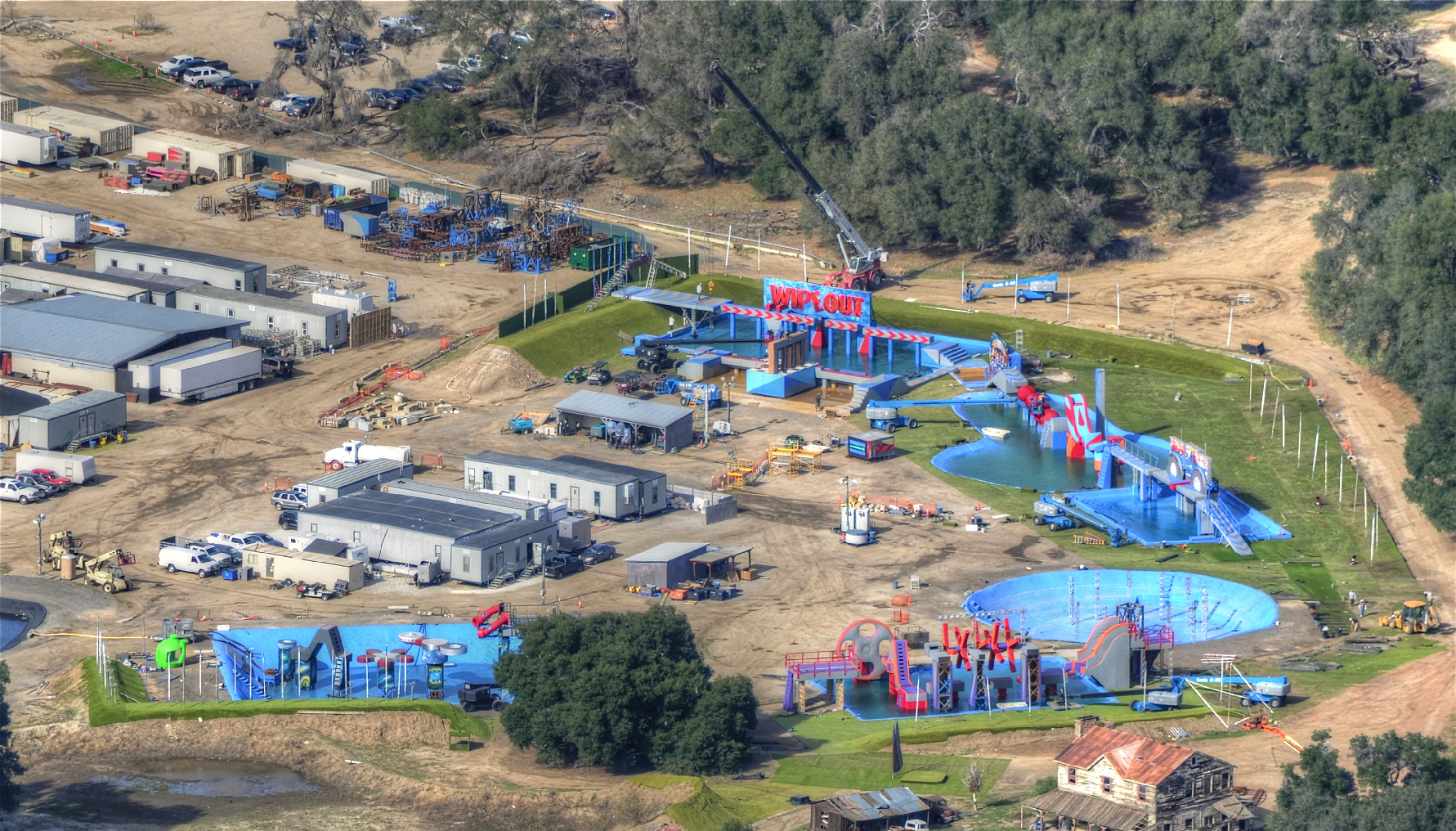
The Wipeout set at Sable Ranch as seen in 2014

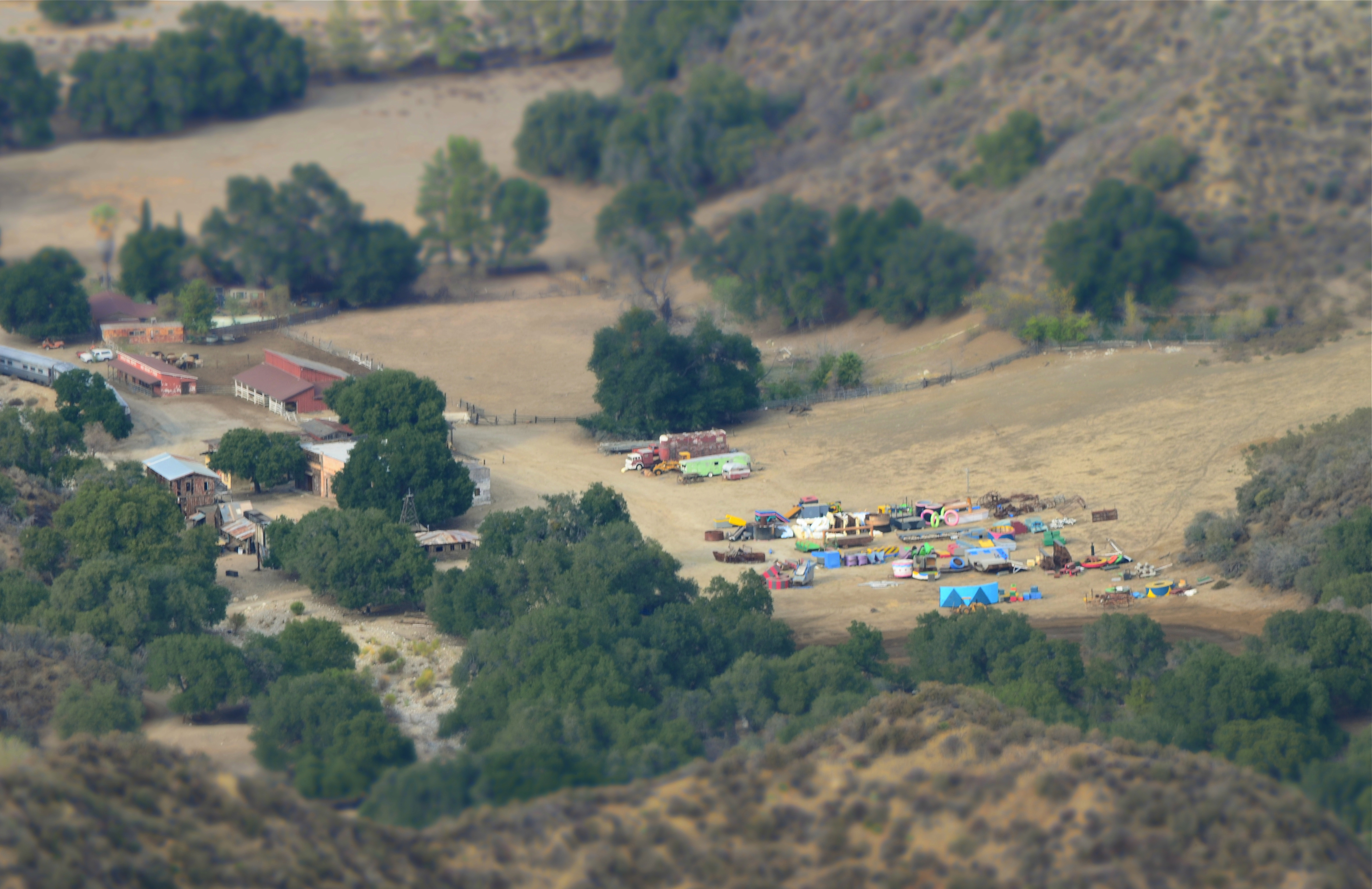
The storage area of the Wipeout set at Sable Ranch as seen in 2013

Contestants compete through four rounds of competition until a final winner is determined. The first round features 24 contestants (they were introduced from seasons 1–3, but from season 4 onwards, not all were shown) running through a series of obstacles. The top 12 finishing times move on. The show never made clear to viewers whether or how the finishing times are adjusted for failing to complete obstacles along the way.

The next two rounds take place on two different complex obstacles. They typically involve large structures that competitors have to enter, navigate around while hostile devices try to knock them off, and then jump to a landing pad to finish, where Jill Wagner awaits them. The competitors keep trying on these structures until roughly half of them have reached the finish; the other half are eliminated. This leaves only the top four (top three in later seasons) to make it to the final round called the Wipeout Zone, where the winner earns the title of Wipeout Champion and a $50,000 grand prize.

The challenges change each week, but always feature offbeat and comical obstacles, such as the "Sucker Punch", the "Big Balls" (the show's trademark obstacle, four very large red spheres in sequence that must be traversed from a running start with failures often resulting in odd-angle rejections), the "Sweeper", the "Dizzy Dummy", or the "Dreadmill". Emphasis is always placed on obstacles that can produce sudden jarring collisions (the obstacle surfaces are heavily padded and competitors sometimes don helmets or flak jackets) followed by spectacular falls into the water below, these being the show's titular "wipeouts". As part of wiping out, the competitors often end up covered in mud, froth, vats of food, or other unlikely substances.

In one of the show's trademarks, the commentators have a humorous running commentary, often mocking and insulting the contestants as they compete. The hosts make frequent use of puns. Jokey sound effects and cheesy visual effects are often added as well. The exchanges between the two hosts is often a subplot of episodes themselves, with Anderson playing it mostly straight as a play-by-play man while Henson offers up off-the-wall inanities and non sequiturs as color commentary. Jill Wagner offers additional features reactions, and also provides interviews with the contestants filmed before their turn begins. These interviews tend to emphasize bizarre aspects of contestants' personalities with Wagner making facial commentary as the conversation proceeds. Generally only those who will pass the first round are introduced, and a nickname is assigned that is used throughout the game.

At night, the show takes an epic and serious turn with the humor dialed down and serious background music instead of its lighthearted theme music. The final four or three contestants play separately on a large obstacle course inside the studio called the Wipeout Zone, each attempting to finish the course in the fastest time, much like the first round. Though slight variations are used in each episode, contestants wear wetsuits and they begin by either sliding down a water ramp or being launched by a giant catapult or blob into the course, swimming to the first obstacle. Obstacles have varied between episodes, but the course contains several obstacles that must be traversed in order to reach the finishing platform. The player with the fastest time on the course is declared the "champion" of the episode and is awarded the show's grand prize of $50,000. The Wipeout Zone often brings competitors to the brink of exhaustion, especially when they have to swim back to a starting point to retry a failed obstacle, unlike the first round. However, in Season 7, the zone was all about speed, and the contestants were given one attempt per obstacle.

== Episodes ==
Season	Episodes	Originally released	
Season	Episodes	First released	Last released
1	11	June 24, 2008	September 16, 2008
2	17	February 1, 2009	September 16, 2009
3	18	June 1, 2010	September 14, 2010
4	31	January 6, 2011	September 15, 2011
5	24	December 8, 2011	September 20, 2012
6	16	May 9, 2013	September 19, 2013
7	13	June 22, 2014	September 7, 2014

== Reception ==
On its premiere night, Wipeout scored the highest premiere rating of any new show in summer 2008, besting competing veteran summer shows Hell's Kitchen and America's Got Talent. As the season progressed, Nielsen Media Research put it at the top of the 18–49 demographic, slightly outpaced by America's Got Talent. On August 6, 2008, Wipeout was officially renewed for a second season. The second season premiered on May 27, 2009, and with an audience of 9.69 million, Wipeout bested its first season average and gave ABC its best numbers in the Wednesday 8:00 p.m. slot since November 2007. The third season premiered on June 22, 2010, with ratings of 10.21 million, with a special "Blind Date" episode getting 12.8 million viewers on June 1, 2010. In 2016, a New York Times study of the 50 TV shows with the most Facebook Likes found that Wipeout was "most popular in Northern, rural areas with a large percentage of white people: Idaho, Utah, Wisconsin and Maine are all on the top of this show's list".

On January 6, 2011, the first season of Winter Wipeout premiered with the series' highest ratings ever, beating the 8.00 p.m. competition in the coveted 18–49 demographic and many other key demos.

== Awards and nominations ==
Year	Awards	Category	Result	Notes
2009	Rose d'Or	Entertainment Category	Nominated	
2010	Entertainment Weekly	Guilty Pleasure Reality Showdown	Won	
2010	Kids' Choice Awards	Favorite Reality Show	Nominated	
2011	Kids' Choice Awards	Favorite Reality Show	Nominated	
2011	Teen Choice Awards	Choice TV: Reality Competition Show	Nominated	
2012	Kids' Choice Awards	Favorite Reality Show	Won	(Note: Wipeout won the award for the first time, dethroning American Idol, which had won the category every time since its inception. Over 220 million votes were cast.)
2013	Kids' Choice Awards	Favorite Reality Show	Won	
2014	Kids' Choice Awards	Favorite Reality Show	Won	
2014	Teen Choice Awards	Choice Summer TV Show	Won	
2015	Kids' Choice Awards	Favorite Reality Show	Nominated	

== Lawsuit ==
The concept and style of the show has been compared to several Japanese game shows, most notably Takeshi's Castle, Unbeatable Banzuke and SASUKE. This was brought to the attention of the Japanese broadcaster Tokyo Broadcasting System, who filed a copyright infringement lawsuit against ABC, charging that Wipeout is "a blatant copycat" of several of its classic Japanese competition game shows. Among the charges are that ABC bought search terms such as MXC (the Americanized comedy version of Takeshi's Castle) on Google to help drive traffic to the official Wipeout page, and that specific obstacles in Wipeout were knock-offs of challenges in those Japanese game shows.

Wipeout creator and executive producer Matt Kunitz, who also executive produced Endemol's Fear Factor (NBC), said Wipeout is "90% Fear Factor-inspired, 10% Japanese game show", adding in a Los Angeles Times interview that Wipeout was born from a desire to do a funny stunt series. He reportedly wanted to sell the show as Fear Factor meets America's Funniest Home Videos. The suit was settled in December 2011 through mediation with a federal judge without going to trial.

== Video games ==
There have been eight video games based on Wipeout. The series was first adapted into Wipeout: The Game, which was released June 22, 2010 in conjunction with the Season 3 premiere. The game was released on the Wii and Nintendo DS, and was developed by Activision. The game is played in two different versions. Challenge mode is where the player can challenge specific obstacles and attempt to beat them in a certain amount of time. The other is Play The Show, which means to play the game as they would in the show. The Wii game is different from the show (and its Nintendo DS counterpart) in that there are only 4 contestants, and none are eliminated during the first three rounds. The game has commentary by Henson, Anderson and Wagner, all three of whom are featured as unlockable playable characters.

Another Wipeout game was under development by Activision, this time for Xbox 360 with Kinect, entitled Wipeout in the Zone. It took full advantage of the Kinect camera and has ragdoll wipeouts and different rounds from the Wii and DS version, such as Bruiseball. The game was released "in conjunction with the premier of Wipeout's summer season on ABC" on June 16, 2011. Activision announced on August 18, 2011, that a direct sequel to the first Wipeout game was in development titled Wipeout 2 for Xbox 360 with Kinect, PlayStation 3, Wii, Nintendo DS and Nintendo 3DS. The new game is described as "Offering updated, outrageous course designs across all platforms with obstacles and effects taken straight from the show's summer and winter seasons. Players must navigate around snow, ice, foam, and fan-favorite obstacles like the Sucker Punch and Big Balls; which are making their triumphant returns alongside more than 50 others". It was released on October 11, 2011.

A second sequel titled Wipeout 3 was announced on June 29, 2012 and released for Xbox 360, Wii and Nintendo 3DS on September 25, 2012 and Wii U on November 18, 2012. Activision announced on June 25, 2013, that a new title called Wipeout: Create & Crash would be released on Wii, Wii U, Xbox 360, and Nintendo 3DS on October 15, 2013.

Title	Developer(s)	Publisher(s)	Platform(s)	Release date(s)	Genre	References
Wipeout: The Game	A.C.R.O.N.Y.M. Games	Activision	Wii; Nintendo DS	NA: June 22, 2010	Action	
Wipeout in the Zone	Behaviour Interactive	Activision	Xbox 360	NA: June 14, 2011	Action	
Wipeout 2	Behaviour Interactive	Activision	Xbox 360; PlayStation 3 Wii; Nintendo 3DS; Nintendo DS	NA: October 11, 2011	Action	
Wipeout	Activision	Activision	iOS	NA: August 30, 2012	Action	
Wipeout 3	Behaviour Interactive	Activision	Xbox 360; Wii; Nintendo 3DS; Wii U	Xbox 360, Wii, Nintendo 3DS: NA: September 25, 2012; Wii U: NA: November 18, 2012	Action	
Wipeout	Activision	Activision	Android	NA: February 8, 2013	Action	
Wipeout: Create & Crash	Behaviour Interactive	Activision	Xbox 360; Wii; Nintendo 3DS; Wii U	NA: October 15, 2013	Action	
Wipeout 2	Activision	Activision	iOS Android	NA: August 28, 2014	Action	

== International versions ==
Endemol Shine North America has sold the show's format to more than 40 territories and has created two obstacle courses in Argentina for those international editions. Past, current and upcoming versions include:

Country	Name	Host	Channel	Premiere
(Arab League) Arab World	وايب أوت; Wipeout	Mustafa Alagha, Tamer Abd El-Monem, Karen Derkalostian	MBC 1	May 2009
Argentina	Hombre al agua	Sebastián Weinbaum and Eugenio Weinbaum (Season 1, 3); Ivan de Pineda and Luli Fernendez (Season 2)	Canal 13	January 5, 2009
Australia	Wipeout Australia	Kelly Landry, James Brayshaw and Josh Lawson	Nine Network/Go!	February 3, 2009
Belarus	Зачистка; Zachistka	Alexandra Pavlova and Ivan Vabishevich	ONT	January 23, 2011
Belgium	Wipeout	Walter Grootaers, Bob Peeters & Lynn Pelgroms (& Wytske Kenemans)	VTM	March 4, 2009
Brazil	Maratoma	Fausto Silva	Rede Globo	July 19, 2009
Canada	Wipeout Québec	Valérie Simard, Alain Dumas and Réal Béland	V	August 31, 2009
Canada	Wipeout Canada	Jonathan Torrens, Enis Esmer, Jessica Phillips	TVtropolis; Family Channel	April 3, 2011
Chile	Hombre Al Agua	Martín Cárcamo and Álvaro Salas	TVN	March 6, 2009
Colombia	Hombre Al Agua	Pirry and Andrea Serna	RCN TV	December 2011
Croatia	Wipeout	Marina Jerkovic	RTL Televizija	April 12, 2009
Czech Republic	Wipeout – Souboj národů	Libor Bouček, Janka Hospodárová	Nova	June 29, 2011
Denmark	Wipeout	Uffe Holm, Martin Veltz, Thomas Mygind (season 1), Maria Montell (season 2), Anne Kejser (Vinter Wipeout)	Kanal 5	March 5, 2009
Finland	Wipeout Suomi	Anna Easteden, Jacke Björklund, Sami Manninen	Fox	March 31, 2013
France	Total Wipeout	Stéphane Rotenberg, Alex Goude, Sandrine Corman	M6	July 17, 2009
Germany	WipeOut – Heul nicht, lauf!	Charlotte Engelhardt, Matthias Opdenhövel and Werner Hansch	ProSieben	March 10, 2009
Greece	Wipeout	Christoforos Zaralikos, Dimitris Menounos, Eleni Karpontini (season 1), Giorgos Lianos (season 2)	ANT1	February 6, 2010
Iceland	Wipeout Ísland	Sigmar Vilhjálmsson, Jóhannes Ásbjörnsson and Friðrika Hjördís Geirsdóttir	Stöð 2	December 11, 2009
India	Zor Ka Jhatka: Total Wipeout	Shahrukh Khan and Saumya Tandon	Imagine TV	February 1, 2011
Israel	וויפאאוט ישראל; Wipeout Israel	Tal Berman and Aviad Kisos	Channel 10	May 10, 2011
Italy	Wipeout – Pronti a tutto!	Lillo e Greg	K2	October 3, 2010
Kazakhstan	Экстрималы; Ekstremalyi	Azamat Ivashev, Anton Zykin, Evgeny Pereverzev, Axaule Alzhan	Channel 7	March 9, 2013
Lithuania	Jokių kliūčių!	Džiugas Siaurusaitis	TV3	January 10, 2009
Mexico	Resbalón	José Ramón San Cristóbal, Eduardo Videgaray	Televisa	August 29, 2009
Mozambique	O Gram Caida	Noel Serra, Cristian Aureliano Maranhao	Promomedios Televisor	September 12, 2010
Netherlands	Wipeout	Wytske Kenemans, Dennis Weening, Klaas van der Eerden, Lynn Pelgroms	RTL 5	February 15, 2009
Norway	Wipeout	Anders Hoff, Øyvind Rafto (series 1-2), Synnøve Skarbø	TVNorge	March 2, 2009
Philippines	Wipeout Matira, Matibay	Paolo Contis, Vincent de Jesus	GMA Network	March 15, 2010
Poland	Wipeout – Wymiatacze	Tomasz Zimoch, Krzysztof 'Jankes' Jankowski, Katarzyna Olubińska	TVN	February 13, 2011
Russia	Жестокие игры Zhestokiye Igry	Dmitry Dibrov (series 1), Kirill Nabutov, Yana Churikova	Channel One	March 7, 2010
Russia	Навылет; Navylet	Danila Dunayev, Natali Nevedrova, Vladimir Strozhuk	Yu	September 7, 2013
Serbia	Wipeout	Ivan Tešanović and Miljan Milićević	FOX Televizija	November 8, 2009
Slovakia	Wipeout – Súboj národov	Janka Hospodárová, Libor Bouček	Markíza	July 3, 2011
Slovenia	Wipeout	Jernej Kuntner and Tomaž Cuder	TV 3	Unknown
Spain	¡Guaypaut!	Carmen Alcayde	Telecinco	December 24, 2008
Sweden	Wipeout	Felix Herngren, Hans Wiklund, Sofia Wistam (seasons 1 and 2), Christine Meltzer (season 3)	Kanal 5	March 8, 2009
Turkey	Wipeout	Asuman Krause, Orhan Ayhan (uncredited)	Show TV	June 30, 2008
Ukraine	БУМ, Битва українських міст BUM, Bytva Ukrayinskyh Mist	Stepan Kazanin, Valeria Ushakova (season 1), Alexander Krikun, Olena Hovorova (season 2)	Inter TV	March 7, 2010
Ukraine	Замочені (Zamocheni)	Ehor Krutoholov, Oleksandr Berezhok, Anna Teslenko	ICTV	June 16, 2013
United Kingdom	Total Wipeout	Richard Hammond and Amanda Byram	BBC One, BBC Three, CBBC	January 3, 2009

Notes:

- In Canada, the original American series airs on Global for the first 5 seasons where City aired the 6th; the French-Canadian television V also aired the United States series but dubbed in French. The original American series also airs in the UK on Challenge (as Total Wipeout USA), in New Zealand on Comedy Central, in Australia on Nine Network; in the Philippines and India on AXN and also on Comedy Central in India, in the Netherlands on RTL 5, and in Hong Kong on TVB Pearl. It is also broadcast in Ireland by TG4 with an Irish language voiceover and in Slovenia by TV 3 with a Slovenian voice-over since season 3.
- The Scandinavian countries Denmark, Norway, and Sweden produce separate versions of the show based on the same footage of contestants from the three countries competing against each other.
- The Dutch version is a collaboration between the Netherlands and Belgium.
- The American, British, Canadian and Australian versions are broadcast in Portugal on FX and also the Spanish and Argentine versions and a rerun of the first season in Portuguese on +tvi.
- The Italian version is made from the American show, with the original audio still audible; some episodes are taken from the British version, Total Wipeout.
- In Mexico, the original American version of the show aired on Televisa's sister network, Canal 5 under a different name, Resbalón Recargado, which is dubbed in Spanish. All 7 seasons aired on the network.
- Pluto TV launched a Wipeout-themed channel in 2019, which solely broadcasts the British, Canadian and Australian versions.
- Seasons 1–3 of the American version, along with the British and Australian versions were first broadcast on Nine/GO! in Australia. In 2015, an uncut British version was broadcast on ABC2 and seasons 2 and 3 of the American version were broadcast on 7mate. Currently, the British version is broadcast on 10 Shake, and seasons 4–7 and the TBS reboot of the American version are broadcast on Fox8.
- The Chinese version is unlicensed, and was not made by Endemol.
