= Ask Rhod Gilbert =

- Genre: Comedy
- Created by: Chris Jones; Stephen Stewart
- Directed by: Pati Marr
- Presented by: Rhod Gilbert
- Starring: Regular Panelists: Greg Davies; Lloyd Langford
- Theme music composer: Cormac O'Kane
- Country of origin: United Kingdom
- Original language: English
- No. of series: 2
- No. of episodes: 16 (list of episodes)

Production
- Executive producers: Stephen Stewart; Piers Fletcher; Mark Linsey; Alan Tyler
- Producers: Chris Curley; Richard Grocock; Stephanie McIntosh; Sophie Cousens
- Editors: Bill Gill; Mykola Pawluk; Coilin O'Cearbhaill
- Running time: 40 minutes (Series 1); 35 minutes (Series 2)
- Production company: Green Inc

Original release
- Network: BBC One
- Release: 27 September 2010 – 9 November 2011

Ask Rhod Gilbert is a British comedy panel show produced by Green Inc for the BBC. It began on 27 September 2010 and ended on 9 November 2011 on BBC One, it is presented by Welsh comedian Rhod Gilbert with Greg Davies and Lloyd Langford as regular panelists.

== Overview ==
In each episode questions are asked by well-known personalities (many of these questions are set-ups for jokes) and members of the public, the host and his guests attempt to find the answers through studio demonstrations, experiments, archive clips, internet distractions, live phone calls and visual link-ups from home and around the world.

The second series became more structured than the first, with four rounds making up each show. The first round, "A Famous Face Asks", begins with a video clip from a famous personality or personalities, with questions asked in each one. The second round, "The World Asks", involves a video-recorded question from a person around the globe, while the third round, "The Audience Asks", is a quickfire round with questions from the audience. The fourth round, "Our Special Guest Asks", involves a question from one of the panellists, and also involves a section entitled "Let's Go To The Lab", where either one or two of the show's 'regulars', Greg Davies, Lloyd Langford and Rhod Gilbert direct a studio demonstration, usually involving one (or two) of the remaining 'regulars' partaking in an "experiment" to help answering the question in that round, with the "experiment" usually involving some form of gunging or minor humiliation of those involved.

== Production ==
A pilot of the show was recorded on 22 March 2010 at the BBC Television Centre but has not been broadcast. Recording of the first series began in September 2010 and ended in November 2010. Three episodes of the first series were recorded at BBC Television Centre, another two were recorded at the BBC Blackstaff Studio, Belfast and the rest of the episodes were recorded at BBC Pacific Quay.

In 2013 Rhod Gilbert revealed that the show had been axed.

In 2021, Gilbert reflected on his own contribution to the show on the vlog Ed Venturing, stating "I think it suffered from being a big BBC1 production show ... It's obviously exciting when you get a show with your name on it... and you naively think that you're going to shape it all, and you realise that... just the number of people with a vested interest in a show like that...you realise that you're one cog of many, and you're sort of a very small cog."

== Transmissions ==
Series	Episodes	Originally released	
Series	Episodes	First released	Last released
1	8	27 September 2010	15 November 2010
2	8	21 September 2011	9 November 2011

== Episode list ==
=== Series 1 (2010) ===
No. overall	No. in series	Authenticator	Guests	Original release date
1	1	Kate Silverton	Jo Brand and Amanda Byram	27 September 2010
2	2	Lorraine Kelly	Dave Gorman and Sarah Millican	4 October 2010
3	3	Carol Vorderman	Micky Flanagan and Suzi Perry	11 October 2010
4	4	James Martin	Connie Fisher and Russell Kane	18 October 2010
5	5	David Tennant	Adam Hills and Rita Simons	25 October 2010
6	6	Louise Minchin	Arlene Phillips and Jack Whitehall	1 November 2010
7	7	Susanna Reid	Andi Osho and Goldie	8 November 2010
8	8	Kaye Adams	Erin Boag and Katy Brand	15 November 2010

=== Series 2 (2011) ===
No. overall	No. in series	Authenticator	Guests	Original release date
9	1	David Hasselhoff	Phill Jupitus and Kimberly Wyatt	21 September 2011
10	2	Deborah Meaden	Shappi Khorsandi and Craig Revel Horwood	28 September 2011
11	3	John Prescott	Edith Bowman and Russell Kane	5 October 2011
12	4	Fern Britton	Katy Brand and Adam Hills	12 October 2011
13	5	Angela Rippon	Amanda Byram and Sarah Millican	19 October 2011
14	6	Nick Hewer	Jenny Eclair and Christian O'Connell	26 October 2011
15	7	Germaine Greer	Larry Lamb and Andi Osho	2 November 2011
16	8	Janet Street-Porter	Andrew Lawrence and Laurence Llewelyn-Bowen	9 November 2011
