= John Anderson (sportscaster) =

American sportscaster

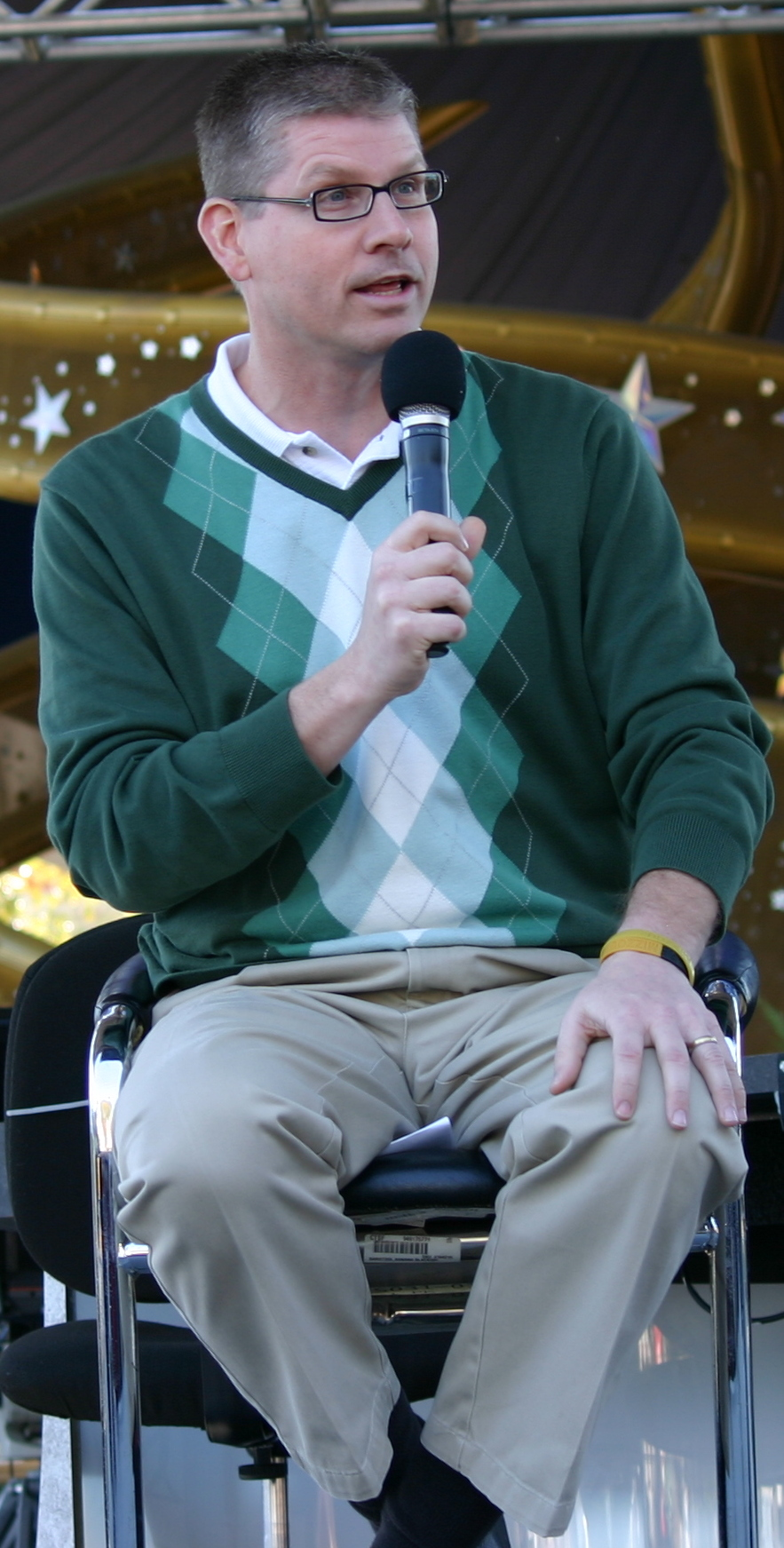
- Anderson in February 2010
- Born: 1964 or 1965 (age 61–62)
- Education: University of Missouri
- Occupation: Anchor
- Known for: SportsCenter
- Children: 2

John Anderson (born 1964 or 1965) is an American sports commentator who served as host of the ESPN TV program SportsCenter from June 1999 until his retirement in June 2024.

== Early and personal life ==
Anderson grew up in Green Bay, Wisconsin, graduating from Green Bay Southwest High School. He holds a journalism degree from the University of Missouri. He is active within the MU Alumni Association and can often be seen at Missouri Tigers sporting events. He served as the grand marshal at Missouri's 2002 homecoming football game.

Anderson is married and has two children.

== Career ==
After graduating from college, Anderson worked for KTUL-TV and KOTV-TV in Tulsa, Oklahoma, and KPHO-TV in Phoenix before joining ESPN.

From 2008 to 2014, he and John Henson hosted Wipeout, a reality game show on ABC.

Anderson was presented with the Bill Teegins Excellence in Sportscasting Award in 2011.

On May 7, 2023, while showing highlights of a Vegas Golden Knights game, Anderson made light of defenseman Zach Whitecloud's last name, calling it "A great name if you're a toilet paper.", a joke referencing the White Cloud brand of toilet paper. Anderson apologized to Whitecloud the next morning, and Whitecloud accepted the apology. Whitecloud is the first member of the Sioux Valley Dakota Nation to play in the National Hockey League.

In March 2024, Anderson announced he would host his last SportsCenter in June, though he indicated he would continue to work with ESPN on other projects.

The Missouri School of Journalism announced on June 24, 2024, that they would be hiring Anderson as their Endowed Chair in Radio and Television Journalism and that he would assume the position in January 2025.
