= Stag (film) =

- Directed by: Gavin Wilding
- Screenplay by: Pat Bermel; Evan Tylor
- Story by: Jason Schombing
- Produced by: John Dunning; Michael Paseornek
- Starring: Mario Van Peebles; Andrew McCarthy; Kevin Dillon; Taylor Dayne; John Stockwell; William McNamara; John Henson; Jerry Stiller; Ben Gazzara
- Cinematography: Maryse Alberti
- Edited by: Mark Sanders
- Music by: Paul Zaza
- Production companies: Cinepix Film Properties Inc.; Rampage Entertainment
- Release date: June 27, 1997
- Running time: 91 minutes
- Country: United States
- Language: English
- Budget: $3,000,000

Stag is a 1997 American thriller film, directed by Gavin Wilding, made for HBO and later released theatrically after drawing large ratings. Stag features an ensemble cast headed by Mario Van Peebles, Andrew McCarthy, Kevin Dillon, Taylor Dayne, John Stockwell, William McNamara, John Henson, Jerry Stiller and Ben Gazzara. It was produced by Lions Gate Entertainment.

== Plot ==
At Ken's bachelor party, a group of men are partying with two stripper sisters named Serena (Taylor Dayne) and Kelly (Jenny McShane). Serena steals one of the men and has sex with him, while a group of men party with her sister Kelly. Kelly accidentally falls onto the stone floor and dies. Another person, her bodyguard, also dies in an accident. Arriving and witnessing the accidental deaths of Kelly and her bodyguard, Serena begins crying and confronts a group of men, who give a weak apology.

Two of the men then kidnap Serena and hold her hostage upstairs. A group of men cover their tracks and eliminate the bodies of the two deceased people. A rescuer frees Serena, but he and Serena are kidnapped by their captors. He and Serena are later rescued. Grabbing the two guns in her hands, Serena shoots and murders her kidnappers.

The reason the wild party began was to turn the tables on Ken, who had always made others the subject of his pranks.

== Cast ==
- Mario Van Peebles as Michael Barnes
- Andrew McCarthy as Pete Weber
- Kevin Dillon as Dan Kane
- Taylor Dayne as Serena
- John Stockwell as Victor Mallick
- William McNamara as Jon DiCapri
- John Henson as Timan Bernard
- Jerry Stiller as Ted
- Ben Gazzara as Frank Grieco

== Release ==
Stag premiered on HBO in June 1997.

== Reception ==
Brendan Kelly of Variety called it "an efficient psychological thriller" that "becomes a tad predictable". Nathan Rabin of The A.V. Club called it "stagey, badly written, and mind-numbingly predictable". TV Guide rated it 2/4 stars and called it "a sometimes gripping, sometimes frustrating suspense drama". Kevin Thomas of the Los Angeles Times called it "relentlessly obvious and tedious".

It has been compared to 1998's Very Bad Things, a film which also revolves around the death of a stripper at a bachelor party. The producers of Very Bad Things were not aware of Stag while the movie was being written. By the time Very Bad Things began being financed, the producers had found out about Stag, and changes were made to the script to make it less similar.
