= John Henson (comedian) =

American actor

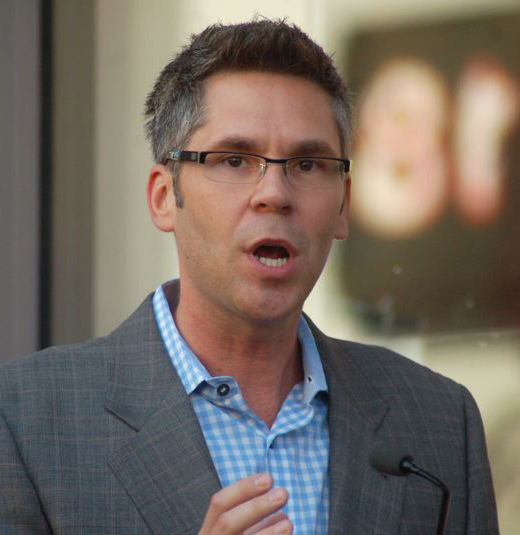
- Henson in 2011
- Born: John Morris Henson; July 11, 1967 (age 59); Stamford, Connecticut, U.S.
- Education: Boston University
- Occupations: Comedian; actor; talk show host
- Years active: 1993–present
- Spouses: Corie Hirschtick (m. 2000; div. 2006) Jill Benjamin (m. 2010; div. 2024) Stephanie Boswell (m. 2026)
- Children: 2

John Morris Henson (born July 11, 1967) is an American comedian, actor, and talk show host. He was the co-host of ABC's Wipeout with John Anderson, a prime-time game show that ran for seven seasons. He rose to prominence as the host of Talk Soup on E! Entertainment network from 1995-1999.

== Biography ==
Henson was born in Stamford, Connecticut, to Joe and Barbara (née Wright) Henson. He has four older brothers, one of whom is Dan Henson, the former president and CEO of GE Capital, Americas. Another is Frank (Bubba) Henson, a teacher at St. Luke's School in New Canaan, Connecticut. He studied acting at Boston University, Circle in the Square, Playwrights Horizons and Three of Us Studios in New York City. He has starred in various theater productions such as Rosencrantz and Guildenstern Are Dead, Conduct Unbecoming, Heinous Crimes and Other Delights, The Greenhouse Effect and Remote Evolution.

Henson was born with a white streak of hair on the right side of his head. As a result, he received the nickname "Skunk Boy" while hosting Talk Soup.

Henson attended St. Luke's School in New Canaan, Connecticut.

Henson got engaged to Halloween Baking Championship judge, Stephanie Boswell, in January 2026. The two got married in June 2026.

== Career ==
Henson began his career as a stand-up comic. He started appearing in films in the mid to late 1990s. He was the longest-running host of Talk Soup on the E! Entertainment Network, hosting just over 1,000 shows in the four and a half years he was with the network. During his stint as host of Talk Soup, he appeared as a guest on Space Ghost Coast to Coast. In 2004, he was the host of The John Henson Project, a short-lived comedy-reality show on Spike TV, and hosted several broadcast specials including ABC's Best Commercials You've Never Seen, ABC's Best TV You've Never Seen and, more recently, the 33rd Annual Daytime Creative Arts Emmy Awards. From 2005 to 2007, Henson was the co-host of Watch This!, a daily television show on the TV Guide Channel. Henson has also produced numerous field segments on the entertainment industry for MSNBC and CNN and, additionally, had a small recurring role as a local newscaster on My Name Is Earl.

From 2008 to 2014, Henson co-hosted the ABC obstacle course game-show, Wipeout, and always ended the show with the catch phrase, "Good night, and Big Balls", a reference to the signature obstacle in the show.

Exempting the year 2020, Henson has hosted Halloween Baking Championship on Food Network since 2017. For the 2020 season, Carla Hall served as both a judge and the host.

Henson has also appeared in the Blink-182 music video for "What's My Age Again?"

== Filmography ==
=== Television ===
Year(s)	Title	Role
1991-1994	An Evening at the Improv	Performer
1994	Two Drink Minimum	Performer
1995	Caroline's Comedy Hour	Performer
1995–1999	Talk Soup	Host
1997–1998	Space Ghost Coast to Coast	Himself (guest)
1998	Remember WENN	Sheldon Glebe
1998	The Best Commercials You've Never Seen	Host
2001	Politically Incorrect	Guest
2004	The John Henson Project	Host
2006	Watch This!	Host
2006	LA Area Emmy Awards	Host
2008–2014	Wipeout	Co-host
2009	My Name Is Earl	Reporter
2009	The Soup	Himself
2010	Who Wants to Be a Millionaire	Guest Host
2010	WordGirl	Voice of Captain Tangent
2012	Austin & Ally	Mike Moon
2012	Kick Buttowski: Suburban Daredevil	Voice of Chuck Glarman
2012	The Funniest Commercials of the Year: 2012	Host
2014	Anger Management	Darren
2015	Penn Zero: Part-Time Hero	Voice of Announcer Ron
2016	Worst Cooks in America: Celebrity Edition 2	Contestant
2017	iWitness	Host
2017–2019, 2021–present	Halloween Baking Championship	Host
2018	Voltron: Legendary Defender	Voice of Bob
2023	Wipeout	Himself (Cameo)

=== Film ===
Year	Title	Role
1997	Meet Wally Sparks	John Henson
1997	Stag	Timan Bernard
1999	Blink-182: The Urethra Chronicles	Himself
2000	Bar Hopping	Roger
2002	Life Without Dick	Dash Davis, The MC

=== Podcast ===
Year	Title	Role
2017	Painkiller Already (#325)	Guest
2024	Joy, a Podcast	Guest
