= IWitness =

iWitness
- Genre: Game show
- Created by: Judge Judy Sheindlin
- Presented by: John Henson
- Country of origin: United States

Production
- Running time: 30 minutes
- Production companies: Entertain The Brutes; Queen Bee Productions; FremantleMedia North America

Original release
- Network: Fox

iWitness is an American game show hosted by John Henson and created and co-produced by Judge Judy Sheindlin. It aired on Fox stations and in syndication on July 10, 2017, for a test run of six weeks.

== History ==
In each 30-minute episode, the game show iWitness features three contestants who try to secure a $20,000 prize by being victorious in the last round. Employing photos and videos from mass media, the program quizzes competitors on their mental acuity. It aired on Fox owned-and-operated stations and in syndication on July 10, 2017, for a test run of six weeks. Hosted by John Henson, it is executive produced by Judge Judy Sheindlin, while Scott St. John is the showrunner. If the test run was successful, the show would be broadcast nationally in 2018 and would be distributed in the United States by Debmar-Mercury and internationally by FremantleMedia. Preceded by Family Feud, iWitness retained almost 90% of its that show's audience in its first two episodes. Broadcast on midnight on the Detroit television station WJBK, the show had its most successful market in that city.

== Format ==
The main game is divided into three separate rounds. At the conclusion of the third round, the player with the most money keeps it and advances to the bonus round. If there is a tie for first place after the last question in round 3, the tiebreaker procedures are as follows: a question is asked, and then an eighth picture (with no monetary value) is shown based on the question.

- Round 1 - What Just Happened? – Two videos are shown, one at a time with Henson providing biographical info about each. After the clip plays, Henson poses questions about the videos. All questions are toss-ups but only up to two players can answer each question. Each question is worth $100.
- Round 2 - What Did We Change? – Only one video is shown and then seven altered stills from the video are presented. The contestants' job is to figure out what different about the picture. Each correct answer is worth $200. Each incorrect answer, however, deducts $100.
- Round 3: Don't Blink – In the final round, seven more pictures are presented and an A-B-C question (a multiple-choice question with the choices marked A, B, & C) is asked for each one. The three players lock in their answers simultaneously by pressing A, B or C on their podiums. The first question is worth $300 and goes up by $100 for each new question, finishing off at $900.

Bonus Round: Double Vision – Again, two videos are shown, only this time they are shown simultaneously (this includes both audio tracks being played at the same time). The videos are branded "Red" and "Blue" and the answers are always "Red", "Blue" or "Neither".

The winning contestant has 30 seconds to score five points. Each correct answer scores a point while each incorrect answer loses a point. If the winning contestant can reach five points before time runs out, s/he wins $20,000. If the contestant fails, then they win no additional money.
