= Kevin Hart: What the Fit =

American unscripted comedy series

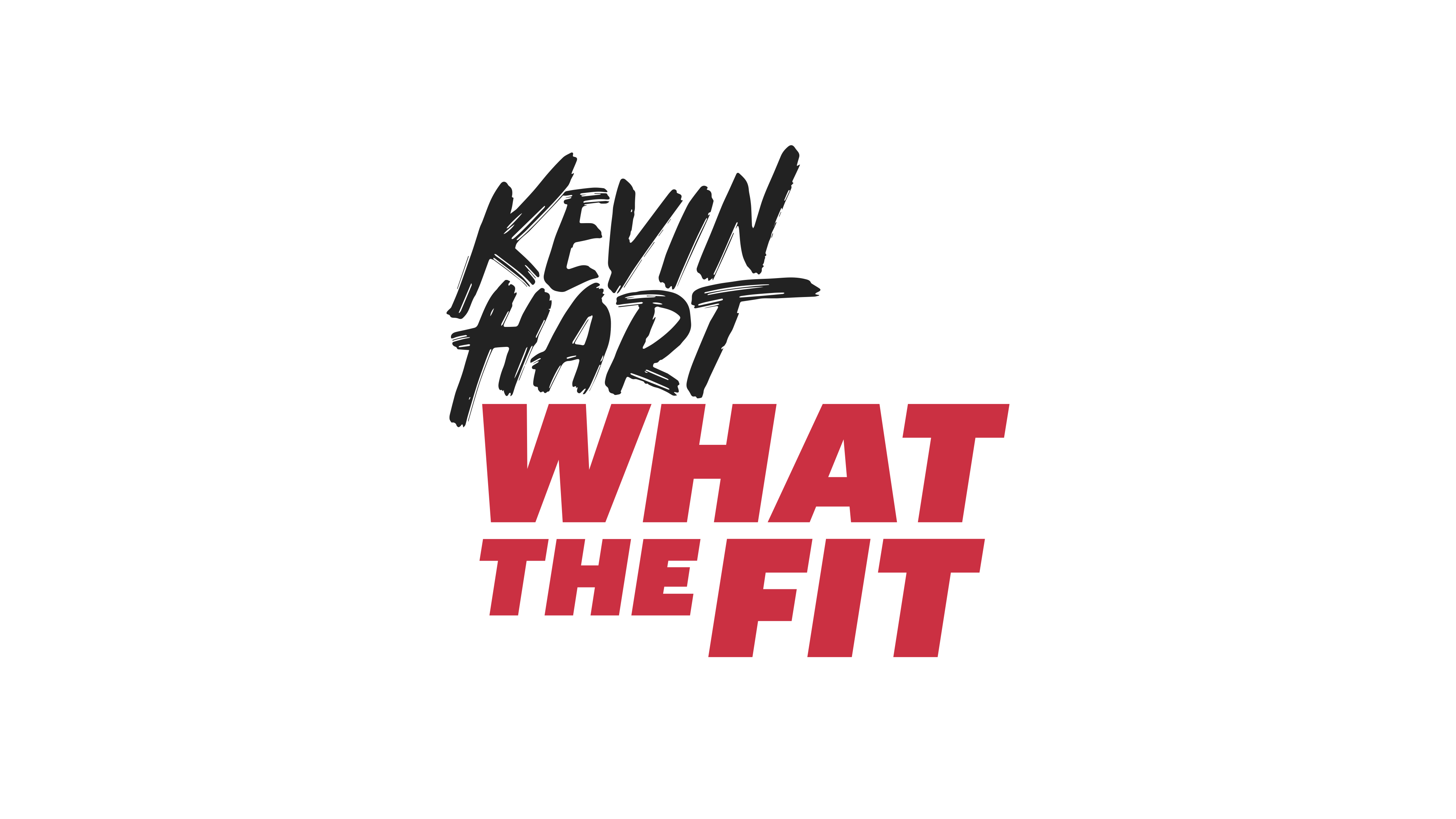
- Genre: Reality
- Presented by: Kevin Hart
- Country of origin: United States
- Original language: English
- No. of seasons: 3
- No. of episodes: 35

Production
- Executive producers: Kevin Hart; Matt Kunitz; David Shumsky; Rebecca Shumsky Quinn; Pip Wells; Jeff Clanagan; Mark J. Harris
- Production companies: Pulse Creative; HartBeat Productions; Lionsgate

Original release
- Network: YouTube Premium
- Release: March 8, 2018 – May 7, 2020

Kevin Hart: What the Fit is an American unscripted comedy starring Kevin Hart that airs on the Laugh Out Loud (LOL) Network on YouTube Premium.

In each episode, Kevin invites one of his celebrity friends to join him in taking on a different, wacky workout, ranging from sumo wrestling to trampoline dodgeball to attending training camp with the Los Angeles Rams.

The series was announced at YouTube's Brandcast event on May 5, 2017 and premiered on March 8, 2018. The first episode featured Conan O'Brien and Kevin trying to master sumo wrestling. The first season also featured workouts such as beer yoga with Chance the Rapper, roller fitness with Tiffany Haddish, goat yoga with Khloé Kardashian and visiting Muscle Beach with James Corden.

In May 2018, Kevin Hart: What The Fit was picked up for a second season. The second season premiered on February 7, 2019 and featured celebrities such as Rebel Wilson, Anna Kendrick and Kourtney Kardashian participating in workouts that included karate, trampoline dodgeball and batting practice with the Los Angeles Dodgers.

In addition to each episode, YouTube posts bonus content, including a collection of deleted scenes as well as a special workout with Kevin and his trainer, Ron "Boss" Everline.

In 2019, the Producers Guild of America nominated Kevin Hart: What The Fit for the award for Outstanding Short Form Program. The show won a Realscreen Award in the category of Digital Content - Web Series/Programs - Reality & Lifestyle on January 28, 2020. On June 8, 2020, Kevin Hart was nominated for the Critics' Choice Real TV Awards "Male Star of the Year" for his work on What The Fit.

What The Fit currently has over 461 million total views across all the episodes and related content to date. It was announced that YouTube renewed the show for a third season on May 2, 2019. The third season premiered on March 5, 2020. The third season features celebrity guests Nick Jonas, Jimmy Kimmel and Mindy Kaling, among many others.

The series is produced by Pulse Creative and Hartbeat Productions in association with Lionsgate and the LOL Network. Matt Kunitz, Kevin Hart, David Shumsky, Rebecca Shumsky Quinn, Pip Wells, Jeff Clanagan and Mark J. Harris serve as executive producers.

== Episodes ==
=== Season 1 ===
No.	Activity	Featured Guest(s)	Episode Description	Original Air Date
1	Sumo Wrestling	Conan O'Brien	Kevin Hart and his friend Conan O'Brien learn what it takes to master the timeless, Japanese art of sumo wrestling.	March 15, 2018
2	Muscle Beach	James Corden	Sun's out, guns out. Kevin Hart and James Corden head to Venice for a quick body-sculpting session at world-famous Muscle Beach.	March 16, 2018
3	Roller Fitness	Tiffany Haddish	Two-for-one ultrasound coupons followed by working out at the roller rink—pretty average day for Kevin and Tiffany.	March 22, 2018
4	Goat Yoga	Khloé Kardashian	If you think we mean "Greatest of All Time," you're not completely wrong. Watch Kevin, Khloé and about twenty actual goats in what might be the greatest yoga session of all time.	March 29, 2018
5	Recreational Rodeo	Leslie Jones	"We about to become cow people" is just one of the many points of ridiculousness found on the ranch. Watch Leslie Jones and Kevin Hart literally grab the bull by the horns as they become fully immersed in cowboy culture.	April 5, 2018
6	As Seen on TV	Bill Hader	Ever thought about buying exercise equipment from a 3AM infomercial? Well, you're in luck. Watch Bill Hader and Kevin Hart test out literally all of them.	April 12, 2018
7	Strongman Competition	Rhett & Link	When the exercise equipment is bigger than Kevin Hart, you know it's going to be a tough workout. Watch Rhett & Link join Kevin and the fourth strongest man on the planet as they compete in the crossfit challenge of a lifetime.	April 19, 2018
8	Boxing	Evander Holyfield & Joel McHale	If there's one thing that boxing legend Evander Holyfield can't teach Kevin Hart & Joel McHale, it's talking trash. Don't miss this main event.	April 26, 2018
9	Gymnastics	Terry Crews	Kevin Hart and Terry Crews push the not-so-limber limits of flexibility with help from the unlikeliest of coaches.	May 3, 2018
10	Ballet	Ken Jeong	There's a reason NFL linebackers can be found dancing in ballet studios during the offseason—it's a tough workout, which Ken Jeong and Kevin Hart figure out for themselves real quick.	May 10, 2018
11	Los Angeles Rams Training Camp	Scott Eastwood	Kevin Hart and Scott Eastwood test their athleticism against some of the most elite athletes on the planet in pursuit of the ultimate goal: a 3-day NFL contract.	May 17, 2018
12	Basketball	Jack Black & Chris Paul	They got their court and recruits—so let's see who's got game. Watch Jack Black, Chris Paul and Kevin Hart ball out at the beach with a few unlikely teammates.	May 24, 2018
13	Beer Yoga	Chance the Rapper	Kevin Hart and Chance the Rapper drink beers, FaceTime celebrities and find their inner yogi at the bar.	May 31, 2018
14	Firefighting	Niecy Nash	Watch Niecy Nash and Kevin Hart scale buildings, save babies and fight fires—all in the name of a workout routine that's a little less routine.	June 7, 2018
15	Daddy & Me	DJ Khaled	Watch as DJ Khaled and Kevin Hart learn that your kids can actually double as one of the best workout partners you'll ever pair with.	June 14, 2018

=== Season 2 ===
No.	Activity	Featured Guest(s)	Episode Description	Original Air Date
1	Karate	Rebel Wilson	Comedienne Rebel Wilson (Pitch Perfect) joins Kevin Hart in a dojo as they learn karate. But Kevin may have his hands full as he learns that Rebel is a seasoned martial artist.	February 7, 2019
2	Moving	Pete Davidson	Kevin Hart teams up with Saturday Night Live's Pete Davidson to help an unsuspecting family move out of their home. But a medical emergency threatens to derail this fitness journey.	February 14, 2019
3	Recess	Liza Koshy	YouTube superstar and Double Dare host Liza Koshy joins Kevin Hart as they go back to school to take part in Kevin's favorite subject: recess.	February 21, 2019
4	Lifeguarding	Casey Neistat	Kevin Hart and YouTube Creator Casey Neistat take to the beach and join the Los Angeles County lifeguards in training to save lives.	February 28, 2019
5	Cheerleading	Damon Wayans Jr	Kevin Hart and Damon Wayans Jr. are used to owning the spotlight, but today they must learn how to be on the sidelines... as cheerleaders. Both comedians will learn the basics, then lead their own squad in a battle for cheer supremacy.	March 7, 2019
6	Track & Field	James Van Der Beek	It's the hottest day of the year, and Kevin Hart is joined by James Van Der Beek in a Track and Field workout. Trained by Olympic gold medalists, the two will make a risky wager to see who can dominate like a true Olympian.	March 14, 2019
7	Farming	Jennifer Garner	Kevin Hart takes a road trip to the country with Jennifer Garner, as the two movie stars experience a whole new level of fitness when they become farmers for a day.	March 21, 2019
8	Los Angeles Dodgers	Kourtney Kardashian	Kevin Hart and Kourtney Kardashian head to Dodger Stadium for some pitching, catching, and batting practice with Kenley Jansen, Matt Kemp, and the rest of the Los Angeles Dodgers.	March 28, 2019
9	Trampoline Dodgeball	Anna Kendrick	With years of bad playground memories behind her, Anna Kendrick attempts to conquer her fear of dodgeball with the help of Kevin Hart.	April 4, 2019
10	Jousting	Jason Sudeikis	Kevin Hart and Jason Sudeikis experience what it's like to become a medieval knight, as they learn the finer points of jousting.	April 11, 2019

=== Season 3 ===
No.	Activity	Featured Guest(s)	Episode Description	Original Air Date
1	Harlem Globetrotters	Jimmy Kimmel	Jimmy Kimmel and Kevin Hart hit the hardwood with the world famous Harlem Globetrotters to learn what it takes to master the art of basketball trick shots.	March 5, 2020
2	1980's Workout	Mindy Kaling	Mindy Kaling and Kevin Hart travel back in time to the 1980s to strengthen their Buns of Steel, do some Jazzercise, and exercise with infomercial king Tony Little.	March 12, 2020
3	Community Cardio	David Dobrik	Kevin Hart wants to motivate an entire city to get healthy, so with the help of David Dobrik, they put out a call for over 1,000 fans to meet up for a community fitness event.	March 19, 2020
4	Tokyo 2020 Tryout	Keegan-Michael Key	Keegan-Michael Key and Kevin Hart prepare for the 2020 Olympic summer games by training in some lesser-known events, including race walking, fencing, and table tennis.	March 26, 2020
5	Ballroom Dancing	Dolan Twins	The Dolan Twins, Ethan and Grayson, compete against Kevin Hart to see who has the most grace and the best moves on the dance floor.	April 2, 2020
6	Mascots	Keke Palmer	Team mascots have tremendous physical conditioning, as Keke Palmer and Kevin Hart learn firsthand when they train with Swoop of the Philadelphia Eagles, Bailey of the Los Angeles Kings, and Otto the Orange from Syracuse University.	April 9, 2020
7	L.A. Galaxy	Emma Chamberlain	With little soccer experience between the two of them, Emma Chamberlain and Kevin Hart attempt to learn from the Major League Soccer team, the L.A. Galaxy, without using their hands.	April 16, 2020
8	Scouting	Nick Jonas	Nick Jonas and Kevin Hart explore the great outdoors with a troop of scouts, all while earning merit badges in a quest to get fit in the wilderness.	April 23, 2020
9	Marching Band	Adam DeVine	You have to be in shape to carry a sousaphone and keep in step with the majorettes, as Adam DeVine and Kevin Hart learn first hand when they join a high school marching band.	April 30, 2020
10	Country Club	Chelsea Handler	Chelsea Handler and Kevin Hart workout at a country club, where they practice some of the activities the club has to offer, including golf, badminton, and lawn bowling.	May 7, 2020

== Awards and nominations ==
Year	Awards	Category	Result
2019	Producers Guild of America	Outstanding Short Form Program	Nominated
2020	Realscreen Awards	Digital Content - Web Series/Programs - Reality & Lifestyle	Won
2020	Critics' Choice Real TV Awards	Male Star of the Year	Nominated
