= Don't Stop Me Now (TV series) =

- Genre: Talent show
- Presented by: Amanda Byram
- Country of origin: United Kingdom
- Original language: English
- No. of series: 1
- No. of episodes: 8

Production
- Running time: 60 minutes (inc. adverts)
- Production company: Magnum Media

Original release
- Network: Sky1
- Release: 18 March – 1 July 2012

Don't Stop Me Now is a talent show that aired on Sky1 from 18 March to 1 July 2012. It is hosted by Amanda Byram.

== Format ==
Contestants try and last for 100 seconds and impress the studio audience or they are ejected.
