= Total Wipeout =

British game show

- Also known as: Winter Wipeout (2011–12); Total Wipeout: Freddie and Paddy Takeover (2020)
- Genre: Game show
- Created by: Matt Kunitz; Scott Larsen
- Directed by: Richard Valentine
- Presented by: Richard Hammond; Amanda Byram
- Narrated by: Richard Hammond; Freddie Flintoff; Paddy McGuinness
- Theme music composer: Marc Sylvan
- Country of origin: United Kingdom
- Original language: English
- No. of series: 5 (Normal series); 1 (Winter Wipeout); 1 (Total Wipeout: Freddie and Paddy Takeover)
- No. of episodes: 57 (Normal series); 12 (Winter Wipeout); 6 (Total Wipeout: Freddie and Paddy Takeover)

Production
- Executive producers: Andrew Norgate; Andy Rowe (Winter Wipeout)
- Production locations: Benavídez, Buenos Aires, Argentina
- Running time: 60 minutes 30 minutes (TW Fast Forward); 40 minutes (Total Wipeout: Freddie and Paddy Takeover)
- Production company: Initial

Original release
- Network: BBC One
- Release: 3 January 2009 – 31 December 2012
- Release: 8 August – 12 September 2020

Related
- Wipeout; Ninja Warrior UK; Cannonball

Total Wipeout is a British game show hosted by Richard Hammond and Amanda Byram which first aired on the BBC on 3 January 2009. In each episode, contestants competed in a series of challenges in an attempt to win £10,000. These challenges were based in large pools of water or mud and generally involved large assault courses that contestants had to cross. They were gradually eliminated over four rounds until one contestant remained, who won a £10,000 cash prize, except for the “Celebrity Specials,” in which the money was donated to the winner’s chosen charity.

Total Wipeout was a licensed version of Wipeout, the Endemol show that originated in the United States in 2008, with the name slightly altered to avoid confusion with the BBC version of the earlier game show of the same name. The show originally ran for six series, including a special winter-themed series, from 3 January 2009 until 31 December 2012. In the summer of 2020, Top Gear presenters Freddie Flintoff and Paddy McGuinness hosted a six-episode best-of series, featuring the presenters narrating shortened episodes of the show, called Total Wipeout: Freddie and Paddy Takeover.

== Format ==
The obstacle course was located in Buenos Aires, Argentina.

The show was hosted by Richard Hammond, who commentated as the contestants attempted to complete the challenges. He was also seen in a studio to provide certain links within the show. Although the main footage was filmed in Buenos Aires, Argentina, Hammond recorded his sections from a studio in England. Meanwhile, Amanda Byram interviewed the contestants during the show and remained on the sidelines as they made their way through the course.

== Gameplay ==
During Total Wipeout contestants are put through a series of obstacle courses and challenges. After each challenge a certain number of them are eliminated from the competition. After the fourth and final round the fastest of the remaining three competitors around the course wins the game and the cash prize. The eliminated contestants can be seen sitting at the side during later challenges. The first champion in Total Wipeout history was, kitesurfer, Oliver Clatworthy.

=== Stage 1 ===
==== Qualifier ====
The Qualifier involves contestants attempting to complete a short obstacle course in the least time possible. The eight contestants with the slowest times are eliminated, with the fastest twelve advancing to the second round (although in the case of the Celebrity specials, all participating contestants take part in the first two rounds). The Qualifier contains the dominant Sucker Punch and Big Balls. The first and last obstacles change every week, however the first obstacle is always set over a pool of water or mud, and the final obstacle is always a 'swing' to the goal. 54 contenders in the show's history have conquered the Big Balls, declared by Hammond as the hardest Wipeout obstacle ever. Those are: Jo and Carole (Series 1, Episode 5), Kierron (Series 1, Episode 7), Alice (Series 2, Episode 2), Alex (Series 2, Episode 6), Eliza, Julian and Victoria (Series 2, Episode 8), Chris and Katie (Series 2, "Champion of Champions"), Paul and Nix (Series 3, Episode 2), Colm, Nic, Ed and Becky (Series 3, Episode 5), Junior and Andy (Series 3, "Champion of Champions"), Jason King and Sarah Cawood (Series 3, "Celebrity Special #2"), Liam (Series 4, Episode 1), Andy (Series 4, Episode 3 and Champion of Champions), Katie (Series 4, Episode 5), Fran (Series 4, Episode 6), Tamara (Series 4, Episode 7) Scott, Frankie, Mikey and James (Series 4, "Champion of Champions"), Chris Simmons (Series 4, "Celebrity Special #1"), Tupele Dorgu and Dean Macey (Series 4 "Celebrity Special #2"), Marina (Winter Wipeout, Episode 1), Dan (Winter Wipeout, Episode 3 and Champion of Champions), Lawrence (Winter Wipeout, Episode 6), John W (Winter Wipeout, Episode 6 and Champion of Champions), Tom (Winter Wipeout, Episode 7) Edward (Winter Wipeout, Episode 8), Jon, Helen, Mikey and John C (Winter Wipeout, "Champion of Champions"), Nicola McLean (Series 5, "Celebrity Special #1"), Clare Nasir (Series 5, "Celebrity Special #2"), Becky and Amanda (Series 5 Episode 1), Ron and Alex (Series 5, Episode 4) William and Helene (Series 5 Episode 7), Amy, Ellen and Liam (Series 5 Episode 8), and Ashley, (Series 5 "Champion of Champions").

Only 7 contestants; Kierron (Series 1, Episode 7), Becky and Ed (Series 3, Episode 6), Junior (Series 3, "Champion of Champions"), James (Series 4, "Champion of Champions"), Chris Simmons (Series 4, "Celebrity Special #1") and William (Series 5, Episode 7) have not fallen off any obstacle during the Qualifier.

The fastest time on the Qualifier is 0:56 by Dean Macey (Series 4, Episode 12), but given the celebrity course is easier, the civilian record is 1:02 by "Non-Toff" Will (Series 5, Episode 7). The slowest time is 16:44 by ‘Bouncy’ Jill (Series 3, Episode 1).

==== Do & Don'ts (Series 2) ====
Richard Hammond would explain the "dos & don’ts for success" for a particular Total Wipeout moment from the course in Argentina.

- Episode 1: Big Balls
- Episode 2: The Sweeper
- Episode 3: Interviews
- Episode 4: Dizzy Dummies
- Episode 5: Sucker Punch
- Episode 6: Speeches (note: filmed during an episode of a Bulgarian adaption of Wipeout)
- Episode 7: Swings
- Episode 8: Wipeout Zone

=== Stage 2 ===
==== The Sweeper (Series 1–2) ====
The Sweeper involves the twelve remaining contestants standing on 10-foot-tall (3.0 m) podiums, over water, while a robotic arm with a long metal rod sweeps across the podiums in a circular motion. Before the Sweeper starts, Richard Hammond tells who is on what podium by naming the podiums from 1–12 in order. The contestants have to jump over it, with the arm getting faster and higher in random sections of every rotation. The game continues until a single player remains, but unlike the American version the winner does not receive a prize. The six contestants who are first to fall are eliminated; the rest move on to Dizzy Dummies. In Series 2 the rules were modified so that only the final five advanced instead of six (depending on the next challenge). Series 2 saw modified versions of The Sweeper, including "The Crusher" and the addition of Potato Sacks.

==== Crash Mountain (Series 3–4) ====
Series 3 introduced a brand new challenge, in the form of Crash Mountain. Crash Mountain involves the twelve remaining contestants standing on 10 ft tall podiums over water while three robotic arms swing round in a circular motion. Before Crash Mountain starts, Richard Hammond will tell who is on what podium by naming the podiums from 1–12 in order. 1 arm is designed for the contestants to jump onto to reach the centre of the mountain; the other 2 arms are designed to knock the contestants into the water while spinning in opposite directions. If any contestants falls into the water they must go to any unoccupied podium, climb and attempt it again. Contestants do not have to attempt to reach the mountain on every rotation of the arm. The five who make it to the centre first advance to Dizzy Dummies. Brian (Series 3 Episode 7 and Series 3 Champion of Champions) and James (Series 4 Episode 3 and Series 4 Champion of Champions) were the only 2 people to win Crash Mountain twice.

Series 4 episode 9 (the Champions of Champions) was the only episode when it was an all-male crash mountain.

==== Double Cross (Series 5) ====
In Series 5, Double Cross was introduced and is the same as the American version: contestants enter on the three green platforms and exit from the single red one as four sweeper arms come the other way. The fastest six go through to Terror-Go-Round.

==== Ski Lift (Winter Wipeout) ====
For Winter Wipeout, the Ski Lift is used instead of Double Cross. The Ski Lift works the same as the American version, which involves the twelve remaining contestants standing on podiums on a "human merry-go-round", over water, while two robotic sweeper arms, called the Scary quid Ski-poles, spin around trying to knock them over. The contestants have to use the grab-bars provided to lift themselves over the sweepers, which spin faster and higher in random sections of every rotation. The game continues until a single player remains, but unlike the American version the winner does not receive a prize. The seven contestants who are first to fall are eliminated; the rest move on to the next round – Winter Blunderland.

=== Stage 3 ===
In Series 2–3, both Dizzy Dummies and The Dreadmill were used. Either Dizzy Dummies or The Dreadmill was played in each episode for stage 3. The Dreadmill was only used once, in episode 7 of Series 3, but both obstacles were used more equally in Series 2.

==== Dizzy Dummies (Series 1–4) ====
Dizzy Dummies involves two rounds with one contestant being eliminated in each round. The five contestants, or six in Series 1, are strapped onto a "human merry-go-round" and spun at speed for 40 seconds. When they are released, the contestants must make their way to the finish line by crossing the obstacles in their way. The challenge has two different routes: round 1 uses the first route, round 2 uses the second, and in Series 1, when six contestants took part, a round 3 was played which reused the route in round 1. The final contestant in each round to reach the finish line is eliminated. The rest spin again and take part in the next round. Examples of obstacles in Dizzy Dummies include the Tippy Tables, Teeter Totters, Dock Maze, Crazy Beams, Doughnuts and the Barrel Crossing. In Series 3 Dizzy Dummies was upgraded, including the addition of The Spinner (from the American challenge "Dizzy Dummy 2.0") and further new obstacles.

==== The Dreadmill (Series 2–3) ====
The Dreadmill also involves three rounds in which the six semi-finalists are paired up. There are two challenges on the dreadmill, which change from show to show. In the first challenge the participants must stand on two parallel treadmills, and when the klaxon sounds they must duck to avoid a giant swinging wrecking ball, which is being lowered and getting faster with every swing. The first person who falls from The Dreadmill is eliminated. In the second challenge, when the klaxon sounds the contestants must lift three rubber doors to reach the end of The Dreadmill. The last person to reach the end of The Dreadmill, or the first to fall off, is eliminated. In both challenges the dreadmill is going against them, making the challenge even harder. The winners of each of the three heats advance to 'The Wipeout Zone'.

==== Terror-Go-Round (Series 5) ====
Terror-Go-Round is the same as the American version except for the name; the American version is called 'The Spinner Round'. Contestants need to keep running while the sweeper arms move and the Terror Twins throw things at them. The game is played over three heats, with the winner of each heat going through to 'The Wipeout Zone'.

==== Winter Blunderland (Winter Wipeout) ====
For Winter Wipeout, Winter Blunderland is used. The course is the same as the American version; except for the name which is different. The five contestants are strapped onto a "human merry-go-round" and spun at speed for 40 seconds (same as Dizzy Dummies). When they are released, the contestants must make their way to the finish line by crossing the obstacles in their way. The obstacles remain the same each week but a different course "theme" may be used (Ice Hockey or The Alps for example). The game is played twice and each time the final contestant to reach the finish line is eliminated. The remaining three contestants advance to 'The Wipeout Zone'.

=== Final stage ===
==== The Wipeout Zone ====
The Wipeout Zone is the final stage of the competition. The three remaining contestants must complete the "toughest obstacle course in the world" in the quickest time possible. This is usually in reverse order of the result from the previous 3rd round (either Dizzy Dummies, The Dreadmill, Winter Blunderland or Terror-Go-Round). Whilst one contestant goes ahead, the other contestants aren't allowed to see the run and stay in the tent until their run is complete. The contestant who completes the zone fastest wins the grand prize of £10,000. The Wipeout Zone is made up of five/six obstacles. In later series and Winter Wipeout (Series 2 onwards), the contestant does not have to re-attempt the obstacle if they fall off; they simply swim to the next to save time. After 6 series of Total Wipeout, only 5 episodes have seen a female winner: Rachel of Series 2, Episode 2, Danielle Lloyd of the second Celebrity Special, Mica of Winter Wipeout Series 1, Episode 5, Kia of Series 5, Episode 3 and Nicola of Series 5, Episode 8. In addition, Series 5, Episode 3 was the first and only episode to feature an all-female Wipeout Zone. Tor (Series 1 Episode 2), Stuart (Series 1 Episode 4), Kevin Adams (Series 2 Episode 10 Celebrity Special), Andy Akinwolere (Series 4 Episode 12 Celebrity Special), Jade (Series 5 Episode 5 Last Chance Saloon) and Simon (Series 1 Episode 2 Winter Wipeout Christmas Special) all gave up in The Wipeout Zone due to either injuries or quitting in the end.

Whilst in its existence, not a single contestant fell off the Seesaw of Truth.

Course times

The fastest time of 1:10 on the old Wipeout Zone was set by James (Series 2, Episode 8), and he matched that time in Champions of Champions in order to win again. The fastest regular contestant time in the new Wipeout Zone was set by both Scott and William with 0:58 albeit during different shows. In the Celebrity Special #8, Dalton Grant beat the record with 0:54, making him the record holder. The slowest winning time on the Wipeout Zone is 4:53 (set by Steve, Series 1 Episode 2). The slowest time in a regular Wipeout Zone of 7:52 was set by Lucy, Series 1 Episode 6.

The nine main episodes of Series 4 winning times were 100 seconds or under, with 0:58 being the fastest and 1:40 being the slowest.

Winter Wipeout

The winning times have varied for those who competed in Winter Wipeout. The fastest winning time is 1:34 (set by Dan A, Episode 8) and the slowest winning time is 4:29 (set by Mica, Episode 5). The slowest time ever was set in Episode 5, by Ross who finished in 9:13. The times set were generally slower this series due to the obstacles being much harder than in previous series; out of the 33 contestants who took part in the Wipeout Zone, only 6 crossed the "Impossible Snowflakes" obstacle - Dan B (Episode 4), Aaron (Episode 6), Mikey (Episode 8), Dan A and Olly (Episode 9 "Champion of Champions") and John W (Episode 6 and Episode 9 "Champion of Champions").

The Course layout

Series	Obstacles					
1	Killer Surf	Barrel Run	Climbing Wall	Spinner	Rolling Beam	Launch Pads
2	Killer Surf	Barrel Run	Monkey Bars	Spinner	Brusher	Launch Pads
3	Killer Surf	Rapid Climb	Balance Beam	Crazy Sweeper	Tarzan Swing	Turntable
4	Killer Surf	Rapid Climb	Seesaw of Truth	Crazy Sweeper	Tarzan Swing	Turntable
5	Killer Surf	Rapid Climb	Seesaw of Truth	Crazy Sweeper	Bumper Turntables	
Winter	Fling-y-ma-jig	Icy Stairs	Ice-Picks	Fright-cicles	Impossible Snowflakes	

== Specials ==
Alongside the regular episodes, a variety of special episodes were held after the main competition.

Present in all series so far is The Total Wipeout Awards show (called The Snow Globes in Winter Wipeout), which served as a recap of all of the best moments from the series, from "Best Big Balls Moment" to "Best Wipeout Zone Wipeout".

Series 2–5
Starting from Series 2 was a Final, in which the finalists from the previous episodes would tackle the course again to determine who would be crowned "Champion of Champions". Although meant to feature all three Wipeout Zone contestants from each heat, no Final has featured all of them.

Series 3 & 5
Series 3 also introduced The Legends special, which gave competitors from across all the previous series a second chance to reach the Wipeout Zone. A similar special episode, called Last Chance Saloon, featured in Series 5.

Series 4
In Series 4 there has been a North vs. South Special with individuals from the North and the South of the country to see "who is better". Also in Series 4 there was an International Special in which a handful of British contestants went head-to-head with contestants from around the world as Total Wipeout went global for the first time, each side captained by a former Total Wipeout "legend", Les (Series 2, Episode 3) (captain of Team GB) and Ali (Series 3, Episodes 1 and 9, Series 4, Episode 9) (captain for rest of the world).

=== Celebrity Total Wipeout ===
During Total Wipeout's run, celebrity specials have been aired since series 2. The format is slightly different from the original show. There are ten celebrities in each show and all of them compete in both the Qualifier and the following round. After these rounds points are given, with the best performing celebrity scoring ten, and the worst performer receiving one. After the two rounds the points are added up and the five highest scorers progress to Stage 3. In the case of a tie, the celebrity with the faster Qualifier time goes through. This mainly happened in Series 3 celebrity specials: Episode 11: Michela Strachan and Tony Tobin both had 12 points, Michela went through as her qualifier time was faster than Tony's Episode 12: Nina Toussaint-White and John Regis has 12 points, Nina went through as her qualifier time was faster than John's but Jeremy Edwards was injured so John replaced him.

==== Contestants ====
The first episode, which aired on 26 December 2009, featured fitness expert Kevin Adams, Strictly Come Dancing professional dancers James and Ola Jordan, actor Luke Bailey, I'm a Celebrity…Get Me out of Here! 2008 winner and former EastEnders star Joe Swash, TV presenter Kaye Adams, stand-up comedian and actor Tim Vine, vocal coach and session singer Carrie Grant, soap star Adele Silva, and javelin thrower Fatima Whitbread. The winner was Luke Bailey with James Jordan in second and Kevin Adams in third after having to withdraw because of an injury. In the special Richard Hammond filmed his segments on set in Buenos Aires.

The second episode, which aired on 2 January 2010, featured ex-EastEnders star Chris Parker, comedian Joe Pasquale, presenter Dominic Littlewood, actress and former Kenny Everett sidekick Cleo Rocos, ex-Olympic hurdler Sally Gunnell, CBBC presenter Kirsten O'Brien, Loose Women presenter Andrea McLean, model Danielle Lloyd and children's TV duo Sam Nixon and Mark Rhodes. The winner was Danielle Lloyd with Dominic Littlewood in second just one second behind Lloyd (Lloyd finished in 2:43 while Littlewood finished in 2:44) and Chris Parker in third.

Series 3
In September 2010, another two Celebrity Total Wipeout specials were aired.

The first, which aired on 18 September 2010, featured Michaela Strachan, Siân Lloyd, Joe Absolom, Antony Costa, Kate Lawler, Ninia Benjamin, Jeff Brazier, Iwan Thomas and Tony Tobin. Nancy Lam was supposed to take part, but had to pull out and spectate. Joe Absolom won, with Jeff Brazier and Kate Lawler coming second and third respectively.

The second aired on 25 September 2010, the contestants were former international athletes John Regis and Katharine Merry, TV presenters Cheryl Baker and Sarah Cawood, actresses Margi Clarke and Nina Toussaint-White, actor Jeremy Edwards, comic actor Rowland Rivron and DJs & TV presenting pair Jason King and Joel Ross, the former being the first ever celebrity to cross the big balls, as well as the equal fastest celebrity (with James Jordan) to complete the qualifier. Jason King won with John Regis coming second and Katharine Merry third.

Series 4
Another two specials were broadcast at the close of the series. The first episode aired on 9 April 2011 and featured Aggie MacKenzie, Calum Best, Chantelle Houghton, Chico Slimani, Chris Simmons, Gemma Bissix, John Fashanu, Kelli Young, Phoebe Thomas and Rob Deering. It was won by John Fashanu with Chico in second and Calum Best in third.

The second episode aired on 25 April 2011 and was contested by Ali Bastian, Andy Akinwolere, Caroline Faraday, Dean Macey, Ian Watkins, James Redmond, Lisa Scott-Lee, Malandra Burrows, Martin Offiah and Tupele Dorgu. Dean Macey won the show with Ian Watkins finishing as runner-up and Andy Akinwolere in third place, after retiring from the competition because of an injury.

Series 5
The fifth series kicked off with another two celebrity editions on 27 August 2011 and 3 September 2011. The first episode featured Dalton Grant, Ricky Groves, Gail Emms, Charlie Stayt, Roxanne Pallett, Simon Day, Brian Belo, Camilla Dallerup, Nicola McLean and Julie Peasgood. It was won by Dalton Grant, with Ricky Groves in second and Gail Emms in third place.

The second episode, aired on 3 September 2011, featured Marcus Patric, Peter Duncan, Susie Amy, Chris Rankin, Donna Fraser, Clare Nasir, Neil Ruddock, Melissa Suffield, Lady Sovereign and Dom Joly. It was won by Marcus Patric, with Peter Duncan in second place and Susie Amy in third.

=== Celebrity Winter Wipeout ===
During Winter Wipeout's run, two celebrity specials were aired. The first winter special, aired on 24 March 2012, featured Eddie Edwards, Tony Mortimer, Steven Arnold, Laura Hamilton, Derek Redmond, Zoe Tyler, Connie Fisher, Charlie Baker, Nicola T and Ellie Crisell as the contestants. Eddie Edwards won the show with Tony Mortimer coming runner-up and Steven Arnold in third place.

The second special was aired on 31 March 2012 and featured James Sutton, Ashia Hansen, Andrew Stone, Kim Tiddy, Diarmuid Gavin, Rebecca Ryan, Sophie Anderton, Jarred Christmas, Peter Shilton and Terry Christian. James Sutton won the show with Ashia Hansen coming runner-up and Andrew Stone in third place.

== Differences from the American version ==
The American version is filmed in California, whereas all international versions including the British version are filmed on the same set in Argentina, which could be seen from Google Maps and the British show format is similar to the American version, Wipeout (available to British viewers on Challenge as Total Wipeout USA). Most games are almost identical to the originals, and most games and a few obstacles retain their American names. Differences are relatively minor, but are as follows:

=== Qualifier ===
The course is almost identical to the American version, albeit with a slightly smaller selection of obstacles to end the course. The main difference is that whereas the American show begins with 24 contestants, Total Wipeout begins with 20, though in both versions 12 progress to the second round.

=== The Sweeper ===
The British version used the "classic" version of The Sweeper in series 1 and some episodes in series 2, as well as "The Crusher" and the Sacks variation, in the other episodes of the second series. The British version reduces the players from 12 to 6 in series 1 and to 5 or 6 (depending on whether the next round is Dizzy Dummies or The Dreadmill) and then continues until one player remains. However, the American version sounds a siren when the "elimination" part of the game is over and offers a $1,000 bonus prize to the winner. The British version does neither, with commentary often mocking the fact that players may well be unaware that they need not continue, and that they are putting such effort into something that offers no reward. The round is continued in the British version to see who is the 'last man or woman standing'. In celebrity editions a player's ranking (first to last to fall) in these round counts towards their points score.

=== Dizzy Dummies ===
The courses and obstacles are identical to the American version, but the format of the round differs. In the American version, the round is played 4 times, with the winner of each round automatically winning a place in the Wipeout Zone and thus taking no further part in Dizzy Dummies. In the UK, it is played 2 times (3 times in Series 1), with the last person to complete the course eliminated. Thus, the finalists for the British version are not decided until the last Dizzy Dummies round is complete. This process also means that the British show has 3 contestants in the Wipeout Zone, rather than the American version's 4.

=== The Dreadmill ===
In the American version, there is only one Dreadmill, but in the British version, there are two; because of that, the format differs. In the Wrecking Ball variation, the contestants had to stay on as long as they could, but unlike the American version, the contestant that wipes out on the Dreadmill gets eliminated from the competition. In the Doors variation, the British version doesn't use tennis balls. The pit that contestants wipe out on is always a pool of water, unlike the Single Dreadmill where the pit changes (e.g. pit of flour and foam pieces).

=== The Wipeout Zone ===
The course was almost identical, albeit with the UK only ever using the "waterfall" version of the WaterWall obstacle, never the "Waterjet" version. The American version's 4-part "Launch Pads" section was changed to the "rolling beam", followed by two Launch Pads. Finally, American contestants heard a horn when their time exceeded that of a previous contestant, whereas British contestants were not told of their opponents' times until after they complete the course. One significant change of the rules in the American version is that if a contestant wiped out on an obstacle in the Zone, they had to go back to the start of that obstacle and re-attempt it until they cleared it but in Season 7 the contestants were allowed to skip the obstacle once they fell off.

The prize money was relatively low at £10,000, though this is tax-free, as are all British gameshow prizes. American winners received $50,000 (approx £30,000).

=== General ===
In presentation, the major difference is the use of one commentator (Hammond), rather than two. Also, contestants are referred to by first name only (unless they win the episode), with much greater use of nicknames. The show retains the gentle mockery of the contestants, although the style of humour is generally drier than the American version. Although the courses are near-identical, the American courses are in California, while the British version is filmed on the "international" Wipeout set in Argentina, along with the other non-American versions of the show. The commentary makes great use of this fact, referencing the location constantly, and often gently mocking contestants for having travelled so far to take part.

The slight change to the show's name is to differentiate it from an earlier BBC gameshow named Wipeout, hosted by Paul Daniels, and later Bob Monkhouse.

== Episodes ==
Series	Season	Episodes	Originally released	
Series	Season	Episodes	First released	Last released
Total Wipeout	1	9	3 January 2009	4 April 2009
Total Wipeout	2	12	4 July 2009	9 January 2010
Total Wipeout	3	12	30 January 2010	25 September 2010
Total Wipeout	4	12	8 January 2011	25 April 2011
Total Wipeout	5	12	27 August 2011	31 December 2012
Winter Wipeout	1	12	17 December 2011	31 March 2012
Total Wipeout: Freddie and Paddy Takeover	1	6	8 August 2020	12 September 2020

=== Series 1 (2009) ===
Series 1 contained eight episodes, airing from 3 January to 21 March 2009, and one Total Wipeout Awards special, which aired on 4 April 2009.

Ratings from BARB.

Overall	In series	Episode	Original airdate	Ratings (in millions)
1	1	"Episode One"	3 January 2009	6.56
2	2	"Episode Two"	10 January 2009	4.85
3	3	"Episode Three"	17 January 2009	5.33
4	4	"Episode Four"	24 January 2009	5.05
5	5	"Episode Five"	31 January 2009	6.34
6	6	"Episode Six"	7 February 2009	6.80
7	7	"Episode Seven"	21 February 2009	4.71
8	8	"Episode Eight"	21 March 2009	6.10
9	9	"Awards Special"	4 April 2009	4.87

=== Series 2 (2009–2010) ===
Series 2 contained twelve episodes, comprising eight regular episodes, plus four specials including a second Total Wipeout Awards. The series debuted on 4 July 2009 and concluded on 9 January 2010. The final three episodes of the series, including the first two celebrity specials of the show, were broadcast months after the first episodes because they were shown as part of the BBC's Christmas line-up.

Overall	In series	Episode	Original airdate	Ratings (in millions)
10	1	"Episode One"	4 July 2009	4.34
11	2	"Episode Two"	11 July 2009	5.05
12	3	"Episode Three"	18 July 2009	4.68
13	4	"Episode Four"	25 July 2009	3.96
14	5	"Episode Five"	1 August 2009	4.76
15	6	"Episode Six"	8 August 2009	4.81
16	7	"Episode Seven"	15 August 2009	4.45
17	8	"Episode Eight"	22 August 2009	<3.21
18	9	"Champion of Champions"	29 August 2009	3.56
19	10	Celebrity Specials	26 December 2009	5.81
20	11	Celebrity Specials	2 January 2010	7.84
21	12	"Awards Special"	9 January 2010	<5.77

=== Series 3 (2010) ===
The first episode of series 3 aired on BBC One on 30 January 2010, with the rest of the series airing from 3 April 2010. The series contained seven regular episodes and five specials. Richard Hammond and Amanda Byram continued as the presenting team. The course was re-designed for the series, including the introduction of a brand new Wipeout Zone.

Overall	In series	Episode	Original airdate
22	1	"Episode One"	30 January 2010
23	2	"Episode Two"	3 April 2010
24	3	"Episode Three"	10 April 2010
25	4	"Episode Four"	17 April 2010
26	5	"Episode Five"	24 April 2010
27	6	"Episode Six"	1 May 2010
28	7	"Episode Seven"	8 May 2010
29	8	"Champion of Champions"	15 May 2010
30	9	"The Legends Special"	12 June 2010
31	10	"Awards Special"	19 June 2010
32	11	Celebrity Specials	18 September 2010
33	12	Celebrity Specials	25 September 2010

=== Series 4 (2011) ===
Series 4 aired in early 2011 and was similar to series three, with some new obstacles introduced to the course. The first seven episodes of the series aired from 8 January to 19 February, with Episode 8 aired two weeks after Episode 7. Episode 9 aired on 26 March 2011, with the next three episodes following over the next four weeks.

Overall	In series	Episode	Original airdate
34	1	"Episode One"	8 January 2011
35	2	"Episode Two"	15 January 2011
36	3	"Episode Three"	22 January 2011
37	4	"Episode Four"	29 January 2011
38	5	"Episode Five"	5 February 2011
39	6	"Episode Six"	12 February 2011
40	7	"North Vs South Special"	19 February 2011
41	8	"International Special"	5 March 2011
42	9	"Champion of Champions"	26 March 2011
43	10	"Awards Special"	2 April 2011
44	11	Celebrity Specials	9 April 2011
45	12	Celebrity Specials	25 April 2011

=== Series 5 (2011–2012) ===
Series 5 began airing on 27 August 2011 with two celebrity specials, with the rest of the series beginning a year later on 18 August 2012 and running weekly until 13 October. The series saw significant changes to the course, including the replacement of the Crash Mountain round with Double Cross and the Dizzy Dummies round with the Terror-Go-Round.

On 29 March 2012, the BBC confirmed that they would axe Total Wipeout after series 5. The final episode, an awards special which was held back to be broadcast at a later date, aired on 31 December 2012.

Overall	In series	Episode	Original airdate
60	1	"Episode One"	18 August 2012
61	2	"Episode Two"	25 August 2012
62	3	"Episode Three"	1 September 2012
63	4	"Episode Four"	8 September 2012
64	5	"Last Chance Saloon"	15 September 2012
65	6	"Episode Six"	22 September 2012
66	7	"Episode Seven"	29 September 2012
67	8	"Episode Eight"	6 October 2012
68	9	"Champion of Champions"	13 October 2012
69	10	"Awards Special"	31 December 2012
46	11	Celebrity Specials	27 August 2011
47	12	Celebrity Specials	3 September 2011

=== Winter Wipeout ===
A winter-themed series, called Winter Wipeout, started on 17 December 2011. The new series, still presented by Richard Hammond and Amanda Byram, introduced a winter-themed course, with new rounds (Ski Lift and Winter Blunderland) and new obstacles (such as the Candy Hoops and Granny's House). The series consisted of eight regular episodes, a Champion of Champions special, an awards special (the 'Snow Globes'), and two celebrity specials. The executive producers for Winter Wipeout were Andy Rowe for Initial and Mirella Breda for the BBC, and the series producer was Emma Taylor.

Overall	In series	Episode	Original airdate
48	1	"Episode One"	17 December 2011
49	2	"Christmas Special"	24 December 2011
50	3	"Episode Three"	31 December 2011
51	4	"Episode Four"	7 January 2012
52	5	"Episode Five"	14 January 2012
53	6	"Episode Six"	21 January 2012
54	7	"Episode Seven"	28 January 2012
55	8	"Episode Eight"	11 February 2012
56	9	"Champion of Champions"	18 February 2012
57	10	"The 'Snow Globes'"	3 March 2012
58	11	Celebrity Specials	24 March 2012
59	12	Celebrity Specials	31 March 2012

=== Total Wipeout: Freddie and Paddy Takeover ===
In May 2020, it was announced that Top Gear presenters Freddie Flintoff and Paddy McGuinness would host a six-episode best-of series, featuring the presenters narrating classic episodes of the show, called Total Wipeout: Freddie and Paddy Takeover. The first episode aired on 8 August 2020 and received negative reviews.

Overall	In series	Episode	Original airdate
70	1	"Episode One"	8 August 2020
71	2	"Episode Two"	15 August 2020
72	3	"Episode Three"	22 August 2020
73	4	"Episode Four"	29 August 2020
74	5	"Episode Five"	5 September 2020
75	6	"Episode Six"	12 September 2020

== See also ==
- Sasuke (AKA Ninja Warrior)
- Takeshi's Castle
