= Wipeout Canada =

Canadian English-language game show

- Genre: Game show
- Based on: Wipeout by: Matt Kunitz; Scott Larsen
- Presented by: Jonathan Torrens; Ennis Esmer; Jessica Phillips
- Narrated by: Jonathan Torrens; Ennis Esmer
- Country of origin: Canada
- Original language: English
- No. of seasons: 1
- No. of episodes: 13

Production
- Production locations: Buenos Aires, Argentina
- Running time: 60 minutes (including commercials)
- Production companies: Lone Eagle Entertainment; Endemol

Original release
- Network: TVTropolis
- Release: April 3 – June 26, 2011

Wipeout Canada is a Canadian English-language reality television series in which multiple contestants compete in numerous obstacle-based challenges. The series is produced for TVTropolis, and premiered on April 3, 2011. The studio hosts are Jonathan Torrens and Ennis Esmer, with Jessica Phillips as the on-site reporter.

== Gameplay ==
The series follows a similar format to the American version of the game. Twenty contestants (four fewer than the US version), aged 18 years and older, compete in four rounds: "The Qualifier", "The Sweeper", "The Dizzy Dummy", and "The Wipeout Zone". The last contestant standing in the Sweeper Round bypasses the Dizzy Dummy and automatically advances to the Wipeout Zone, unlike the US version where the last contestant standing wins a $1,000 bonus. Four contestants make it to the final round, called the "Wipeout Zone", for the chance to win $50,000.

== Production ==
The Wipeout format is licensed to Lone Eagle Entertainment, an independent production company based in Toronto. The company announced multiple casting calls for English-speaking Canadians over 19 years of age. The application process for season 1 was open from June 2 to July 1, 2010. Out of 44,619 applicants, 260 were chosen to be contestants. In October 2010, thirteen one-hour episodes were taped on the Wipeout set in Buenos Aires, Argentina.

Wipeout Canada was not renewed for a second season.
