= Amanda Byram =

Irish television presenter and former model (born 1973)

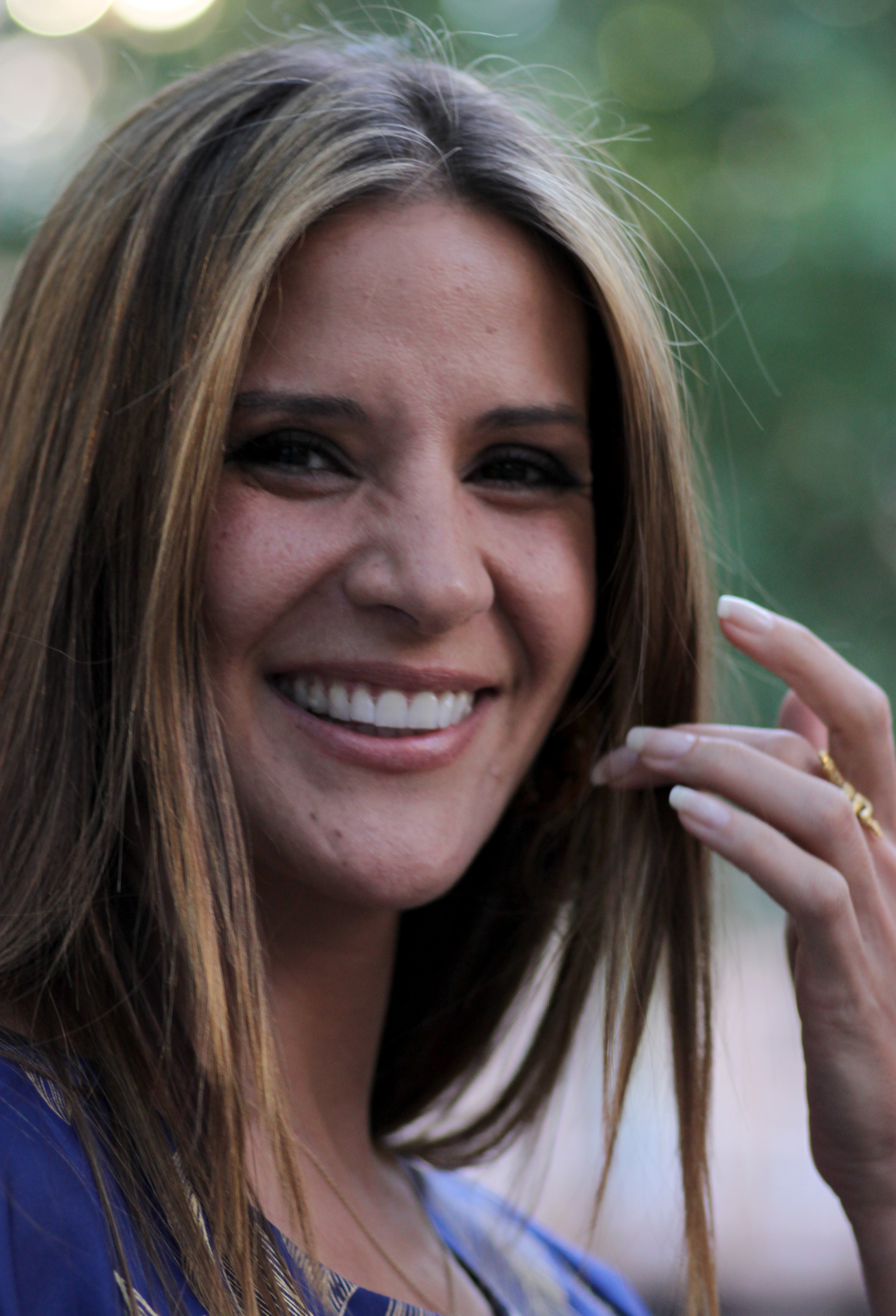
- Byram in July 2010
- Born: 16 June 1973 (age 53); Dublin, Ireland
- Occupation: TV presenter
- Years active: 1999–present
- Spouse: Julian Okines (m. 2016)
- Children: 2
- Website: www.amandabyram.com

Amanda Byram (born 16 June 1973) is an Irish television presenter and former model, best known for co-presenting BBC One game show Total Wipeout with Richard Hammond, the Irish version of Dancing with the Stars on RTÉ One and for hosting American television shows, The Swan and Paradise Hotel.

== Early life ==
Formerly a model, Byram started her career on television in 1999 presenting the TV3 morning show Ireland AM with Mark Cagney, during which time she met her then-boyfriend, comedian Patrick Kielty.

== Television career ==
Soon afterwards she began appearing on British television, initially as a host on The Big Breakfast on Channel 4 in 2001 and subsequently appeared as a guest host on Liquid News on BBC Three in 2002. She also presented the UK edition of Entertainment Tonight, which aired on Sky One.

Having broken up with Kielty, she relocated to the United States, choosing to base herself in Los Angeles. Numerous TV presenting roles followed including the reality television series Paradise Hotel, in 2003 and 2008.

Byram hosted the Miss World pageant in 2003 and briefly appeared in David Hewlett's 2006 film A Dog's Breakfast.

Byram served as the host for the Fox reality television special Seriously, Dude, I'm Gay, which was set to air on June 7, 2004. However, the special was abruptly shelved eleven days before its premiere following backlash from the media monitoring organization GLAAD. Speaking on the special's cancellation, Byram commented: "Of course it is always disappointing when things don't air, but TV and the FCC is very sensitive right now, and I roll with the decisions made by the Fox network, as they have been and continue to be very supportive to me."

In 2007 she co-hosted, along with Dennis Miller, the Game Show Network programme Grand Slam, a US version of the British quiz format. She has also worked on The Swan, a controversial beauty show following 16 unattractive women who turn their life around by having an extreme makeover. She also appeared as a special guest on Anonymous in 2009.

She hosted the Meteor Music Awards at the RDS, Dublin on 17 March 2009 and appeared on The Cafe on 30 January to publicise her selection.

She has co-hosted the British gameshow Total Wipeout alongside Richard Hammond, from 3 January 2009. After 5 series and 1 Winter series, the final episode was aired on 31 December 2012.

She also regularly co-hosted Something for the Weekend with Tim Lovejoy, standing in for Louise Redknapp, as well as standing in for Lovejoy on its replacement series, Sunday Brunch.

In 2010, she appeared in one episode of Supersize vs Superskinny, helping Anna Richardson get the perfect body. On 6 August 2010, Byram presented This Morning with Paddy McGuinness.

Byram was a guest on the first episode of the BBC One panel game Ask Rhod Gilbert.

In January and February 2011 she presented selected Strictly Come Dancing Live! shows across different locations. Kate Thornton presented the shows that Byram missed.

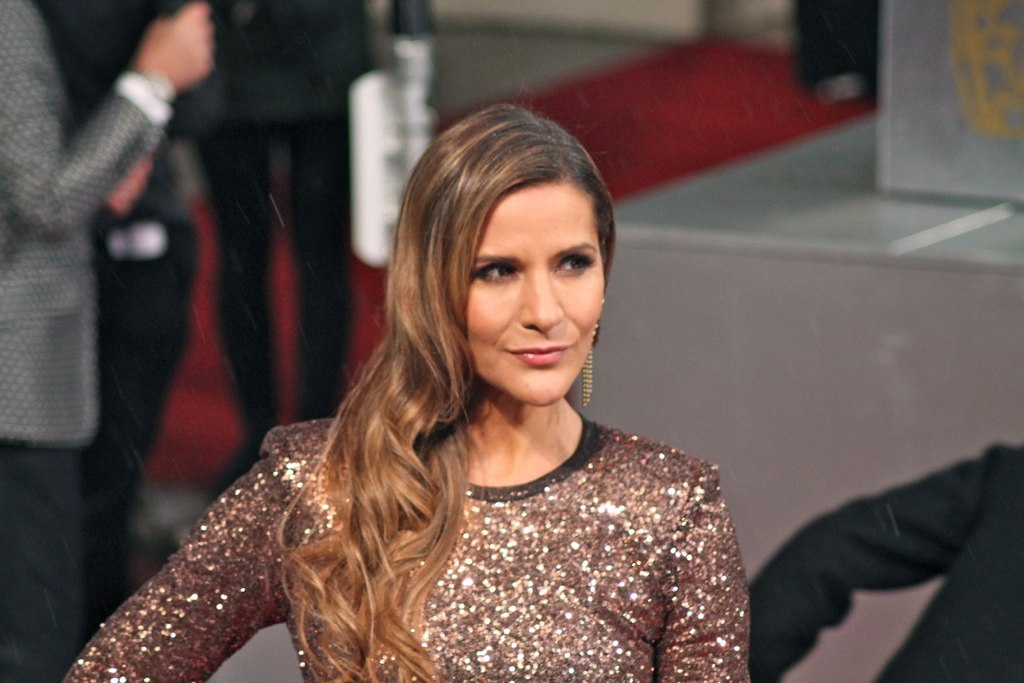
Byram at the 2013 BAFTA Film Awards.

On 8 January 2011, Byram appeared in an episode of BBC One show The Magicians. As the celebrity on the losing team, she had to endure the forfeit trick at the end of the episode, laying on a bed of nails while a motorcycle drove over her and Chris Korn.

Byram hosted a new TV show for Sky 1 HD, called Don't Stop Me Now, in 2012. The first episode aired on 18 March 2012.

On 31 May 2013, Byram presented This Morning with Jake Humphrey.

In November 2016, it was reported and later confirmed that Byram would host the Irish version of Dancing with the Stars alongside Nicky Byrne. The series started in January 2017 on RTÉ One and is based on the format of the original British TV series Strictly Come Dancing. On 28 August 2018, after two series, Byram confirmed that she would not be returning as a presenter in 2019.

From 2019 to 2022, Byram served as a host on Food Unwrapped.

== Personal life ==
Before she moved to the United States, Byram was in a relationship with comedian Patrick Kielty. Currently living in Fulham, South-west London, she was engaged to former rugby union player Craig McMullen. However, she announced in January 2012 that she had split from him.

Since April 2014, she has been in a relationship with Julian Okines, a creative content producer. In December 2015, they announced their engagement, and they got married in April 2016. Byram gave birth to their son named Phoenix in November 2021.

She adheres to a fitness routine and is known for being proud of her physique.
