= Matt Kunitz =

American television executive producer (born 1968)

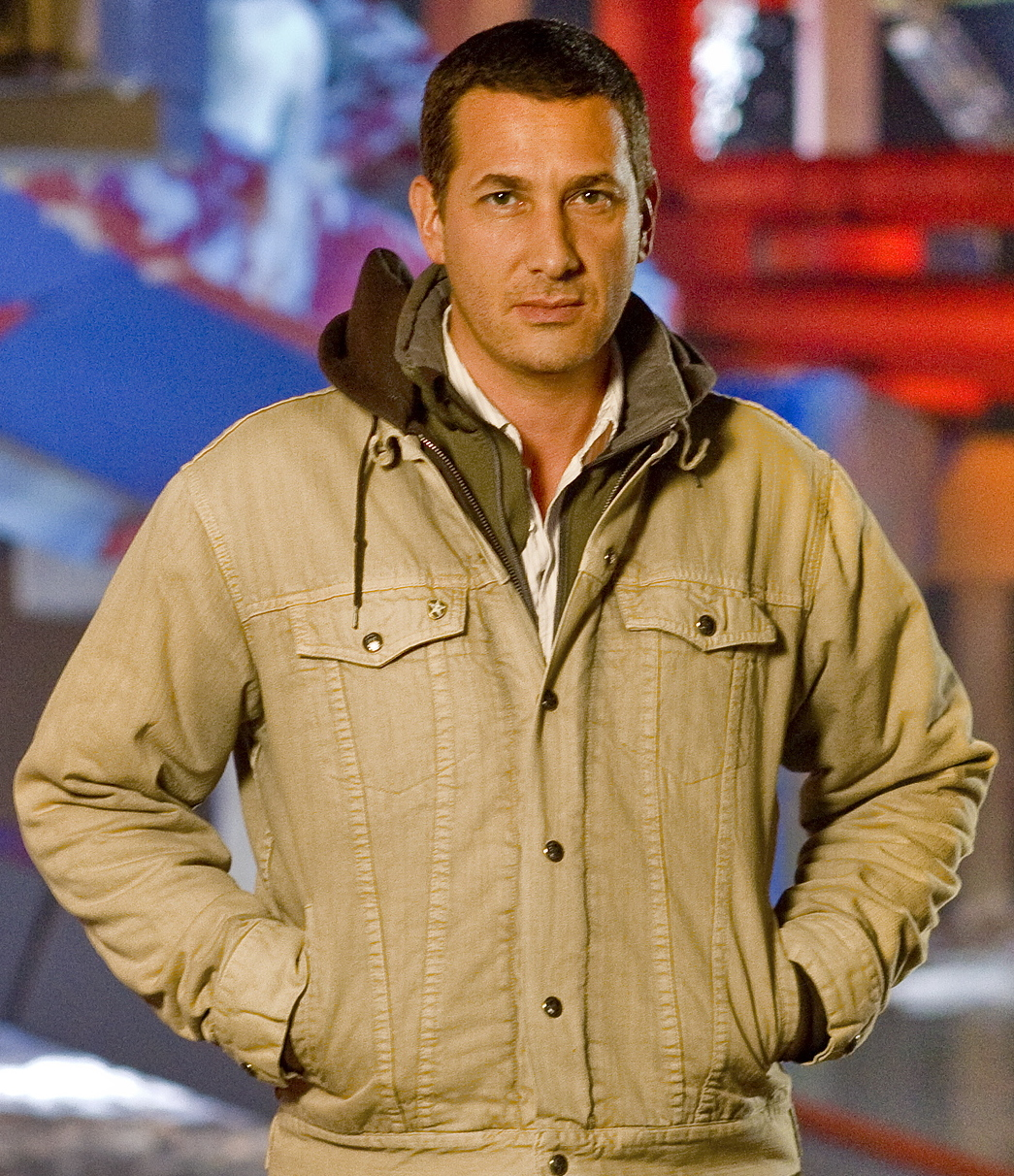
- Kunitz on the set of Wipeout in 2010
- Born: November 5, 1968 (age 57); New York City, New York, U.S.
- Occupation: Television producer

Matt Kunitz (born November 5, 1968) is an American television producer who specializes in reality television. In July 2008, the Los Angeles Times named him "The King of Reality TV."

== Biography ==
Kunitz was supervising producer of The Real World, one of the first reality television shows to gain a national audience, and was executive producer of NBC's Fear Factor. The Wall Street Journal called Fear Factor "one of the biggest hits on TV -- and an important cash cow for NBC." Kunitz spent six years in an overall production deal with NBC and Universal Studios, Inc. During his tenure, Kunitz served as executive producer of Dog Eat Dog and Late Friday, as well as consultant on Lost and Treasure Hunters. In March 2006, Kunitz left NBC Universal and began a two year overall deal with reality powerhouse Endemol USA, producers of Fear Factor, Deal or No Deal, Extreme Makeover: Home Edition, and Big Brother. Kunitz's first assignment at Endemol was to adapt and executive produce Endemol's U.S. version of the singing competition Operacion Triunfo for ABC, retitled The One: Making a Music Star.

In 2008, Kunitz served as executive producer of Celebrity Circus for NBC. Kunitz executive produced Wipeout, a stunt based competition he created for ABC. Wipeout became the highest-rated summer series of that year. The Wipeout format has been sold to more than 37 territories and Endemol has created an obstacle course in Argentina for those international editions. The second season of Wipeout premiered on May 27, 2009. It topped the 8 o'clock demos — So You Think You Can Dance included. With an audience of 9.69 million, Wipeout bested its Season 1 average and gave ABC its best numbers in the Wednesday-at-8 slot since November 2007. Kunitz explained to The New York Times that Wipeout "turned out to be a real family show" and that has led to its success. Wipeout began its sixth season in May 2013. On March 29, 2014, the series won the 2014 Nickelodeon Kids' Choice Award for Favorite Reality Show for the third year in a row. On August 10, 2014, the series won the 2014 Teen Choice Award for Choice Summer TV Series.

On March 26, 2010, Variety announced a new two-year deal between Endemol USA and Kunitz. On June 10, 2010, Variety announced that Kunitz will executive produce a new series for ABC, "101 Ways to Leave a Gameshow" On August 15, 2010, Wipeout was renewed for a fourth season. In March 2011, ABC announced a summer pick up of "101 Ways to Leave a Game Show" In June 2011, NBC announced the return of Fear Factor. NBC ordered 10 hours of the series to return in the fall.

After six years at NBC Universal and six at Endemol, It was announced on March 20, 2012, that Kunitz would join FremantleMedia North America in a multi-year overall deal with the company behind Fox's American Idol and The X Factor and NBC's America's Got Talent to develop and produce new unscripted shows.

On December 2, 2014, it was announced that Kunitz had signed a new multi-year deal with Lionsgate, the studio behind the Twilight and Hunger Games franchises, Mad Men, Nurse Jackie and Orange Is the New Black. At Lionsgate, Kunitz will develop and produce unscripted programming through his Pulse Creative banner.

On January 19, 2016, Fox announced the pick up of Kicking & Screaming, created and executive produced by Kunitz. The series is a comedic competition that teams 10 expert survivalists with pampered partners.

On October 18, 2016, CBS announced that Kunitz created and will executive produce Candy Crush. The series will take the most popular mobile app and turn it into a live-action game show.

On May 4, 2017, YouTube announced that Kunitz created and will executive produce Kevin Hart: What the Fit. Kevin Hart will team up with celebrity friends and YouTube stars as they attempt to master a different trending, grueling and sometimes ridiculous workout.

On July 12, 2017, Vice News dubbed Kunitz "the Orson Welles of prime-time game shows."

On May 3, 2018, YouTube announced a second season of Kevin Hart: What the Fit.

On January 4, 2019, The Producers Guild of America nominated Kevin Hart: What the Fit for the award for outstanding short form program.

On May 2, 2019, YouTube announced a third season of Kevin Hart: What the Fit stating the first two seasons had driven over 275 million total views.

On April 29, 2020, TBS announced a revival of Wipeout with a twenty-episode run. Kunitz was slated to return. The reboot premiered on April 1, 2021, as 2021's highest rated new unscripted cable show. Just one month after its premiere, TBS announced a second season pickup of an additional twenty episodes.

In 2023, Kunitz was brought on to executive producer and show run the inaugural season of Deal or No Deal Island for NBC. On May 7, 2024, NBC announced a second season pickup for the series. The first season averaged 5.8 million total viewers across all platforms and ranked as the top NBC unscripted series on Peacock.

Kunitz was named number 69 on Bernard Goldberg's list of 100 People Who Are Screwing Up America.
