= Big Brother: Celebrity Hijack =

Coordinates: 51°39′23″N 0°16′02″W

- Big Brother: Celebrity Hijack logo
- Presented by: Dermot O'Leary
- No. of days: 26
- No. of housemates: 12
- Winner: John Loughton
- Runner-up: Emilia Arata
- Companion shows: Big Brother's Little Brother; Big Brother's Big Mouth; Big Brother's Big Brain; Big Brother Live; Diary Room Uncut
- No. of episodes: 28

Release
- Original network: E4
- Original release: 3 January – 28 January 2008

Big Brother: Celebrity Hijack is a special series of Celebrity Big Brother, a spin-off series of the British reality television programme Big Brother. It was broadcast on E4 from 3–28 January 2008. A number of closely associated programmes also aired on the same channel. Dermot O'Leary – who had hosted Big Brother's Little Brother since 2001 – was the main host of Celebrity Hijack, and it was his final series of Big Brother.

The series was announced on 8 October 2007 by Channel 4 and that it would be replacing Celebrity Big Brother in January 2008, due to the widely publicised racism controversy in Celebrity Big Brother 5. In 2009, Celebrity Big Brother returned to Channel 4 and no further series of Celebrity Hijack were produced.

The premise of the series saw one celebrity a day taking control, with the help of Big Brother; organising their own tasks, making their own rules and talking to the housemates in the Diary Room. They were in charge of a set of housemates, ranging in age from 18- to 21-years-old and all having a special talent.

The housemates competed to be the last to leave the house for a £50,000 prize. The series ended on 28 January with John Loughton being voted as the winner.

== Housemates ==
The housemates for this series were a mixture of British 18- to 21-year-olds, all with a special talent.

Name	Age on entry	Hometown	Occupation	Day entered	Day exited	Result
John Loughton	20	Edinburgh	Politician	1	26	Winner
Emilia Arata	18	Birmingham	Circus performer	1	26	Runner-up
Amy Jackson	21	Oxford	Conceptual artist	1	26	3rd place
Anthony Ogogo	19	Suffolk	Boxer	1	26	4th place
Jeremy Metcalfe	19	Hampshire	Racing driver	1	26	5th place
Nathan Fagan-Gayle	21	London	Singer/songwriter	1	26	6th place
Calista Robertson	19	London	Classical musician	1	23	Evicted
Jay Wilson	19	London	Fashion designer	1	23	Evicted
Latoya Satnarine	19	London	Dancer	1	21	Evicted
Victor Arata	19	Birmingham	Circus performer	1	16	Evicted
Liam Young	19	Liverpool	Entrepreneur	1	16	Evicted
Jade Eden	21	London	Beauty queen	1	9	Evicted

=== Amy Jackson ===
Jacqueline Amy Jackson (born 1986, Leeds) is a conceptual artist who lived in Leeds where she attended Leeds Girls' High School. She holds an MFA in Fine Art from The Ruskin School of Drawing and Fine Art part of the University of Oxford. She won the Geoffrey Rhodes Prize for the highest first-year exam results, and is a multi-award-winning conceptual artist working with photography and installations – Amy doesn't paint as she finds it 'too messy'. Amy wanted to incorporate her experience in the Big Brother House into her artwork. She plays the saxophone, piano, clarinet and trombone. During the Andy McNab task, both Amy and Anthony were taken away and interrogated. They were both given a code and whoever did not tell the code to McNab won a £5,000 prize and immunity to that week's eviction. Jackson was favourite to win the series, but she finished third place on the final day, Day 26. Jackson eventually graduated with a first-class degree in a Fine Art from The University of Oxford. Since leaving university she founded a new website called Lost Found and Loved Again for likeminded artists and designers who create upcycled goods from vintage items and a Pop Up Supper Club, an experiential dining company in London, which raises funds and awareness for crucial causes. Amy Jackson still works as an artist creating public art and participating in group and solo exhibitions. In recent years she studied Sustainable Finance at the Smith School of Enterprise and the Environment, University of Oxford and also works in responsible investment where she presents about issues surrounding climate change on radio shows and podcasts including Breaking Banks.

=== Anthony Ogogo ===
Anthony Osezua Ogogo (born 24 November 1988 in Lowestoft, Suffolk) is an international boxer who has captained Great Britain's team in the World European and Junior Olympic Tournaments. He won the Junior Olympics in 2004, picked up the Most Outstanding Boxer of the Tournament and was crowned World Under 17 Champion in 2005. He represented Great Britain in the Summer 2012 London Olympics and won a bronze medal. Training three times a day, Anthony's overall ambition is to become World Champion, but he would also love to become the first mixed-race James Bond. His boxing name is 'Beautiful Brown Suga'. On Day 26, Anthony was evicted, despite being second favourite to win, he came fourth. In 2015 Anthony participated in Strictly Come Dancing. In 2019, Anthony Ogogo had to retire from boxing following a serious eye injury.

=== Calista Robertson ===
Calista Kazuko Robertson (born 27 March 1988 in London) is a classical musician and children's music teacher. She has been playing the violin since she was 3 years-old and can also play the piano. Her father Paul Robertson is one of the founding members of the Medici String Quartet. She is currently studying at King's College London, where she receives instrumental tuition via the Royal Academy of Music. Calista specialised in composition at The Royal Academy of Music's junior academy under David Knotts and was awarded full scholarships to attend Miguel Mera's Film Music course with Stile Antico in 2007, both at Dartington Summer School. Calista has written over 100 songs ranging from full orchestral to cheesy pop, including the newly famous (thanks to Harry Hill) 'Bongo Jam'. She also teaches piano to 7- to 9-year-olds, as well as privately teaching violin, singing and music theory. Calista was the sixth housemate to be evicted, and left the house on Day 23 in a double eviction. Calista also went to St Catherine's School in Bramley as her secondary school.

=== Emilia Arata ===
Carmen Emilia Arata (born 1989, Birmingham) is a professional circus performer. She and her brother Victor have performed in front of the likes of The Prince of Wales and The Princess Royal. They also took part in Graham Norton's BBC One talent show When Will I Be Famous? in 2007 where they went on to win. Emilia comes from seven generations of circus performers and has been in training since she was four years old, performing professionally for the first time when she was six. Emilia performs six nights a week at the Palazzo Variety Show in Berlin with her brother Victor. Their mother Carmen is a trainer on Sky One reality show Cirque de Celebrite. Emilia has a list of work-related injuries that include broken knee, shoulder, wrist, fingers, and several ribs. Throughout the series, Emilia was regularly booed by the crowds outside the house, however despite facing three eviction votes, she survived them all to make a surprise appearance in the final. She speaks fluent Italian. Emilia was announced as the runner-up, on Day 26, with 46.1% of the votes. In 2015, Emilia and her other brother, Billy, appeared on Britain's Got Talent. In 2017, Emilia and Billy appeared on the 12th season of America's Got Talent.

=== Jade Eden ===
Jade Keiley Eden (born 28 November 1986) is a professional beauty queen. Jade has won numerous beauty pageant awards including Miss Essex 2006, Miss Winchester 2007 and came third in Miss England behind Naomi Smith who came second and Georgia Horsley. She is just back from competing in Miss Global City where she won the European section and was also awarded with Miss Sunshine Beauty 2007. She has been a member of Mensa since the age of four. Jade won a scholarship to a school for gifted children and recently graduated from The Urdang Academy in Covent Garden where she was also awarded a scholarship for Professional Musical Theatre. Jade is also an award-winning dancer. She competed internationally in Artistic Gymnastics and won 3rd prize for most expressive floor routine. She also featured in the music video for Blazin' Squad's single, "We Just Be Dreamin'". On Day 9, Jade was the first housemate to be evicted.

Recently, Jade appeared on the Walkers crisps Do Us a Flavour campaign as one of the dancers for its Onion Baji advertisement.

=== Jay Wilson ===
Jay Clive Wilson (born 13 April 1988 in London, England) is a fashion designer whose work has been showcased in both the New York and Caribbean fashion week. Jay has previously won the Tyler Media Award for young designers. He is stocked in some of the many design stores in Manhattan and describes his range as chic, classic and simplistic. Jay was the fifth housemate to be evicted, and left the house on Day 23 in a double eviction.

=== Jeremy Metcalfe ===
Jeremy Robert Metcalfe (born 9 April 1988 in Fleet, Hampshire) is a racing driver currently competing in the British Formula Renault Championship. The first time Jeremy got behind the wheel of a go-kart at the age of eight, he broke the track record on his first lap, and since then his life has revolved around karting and latterly racing driving. He won the British Cadet Kart Championship in 2000, in 2006 Jeremy was nominated for the McLaren Autosport BRDC Young Driver of the Year and in 2007 he was named as the BRDC Rising Star, classing him in the top six or so best young drivers in the UK. On Day 26 Jeremy was evicted, coming in fifth place.

=== John Loughton ===
John Loughton (born 1987 in Edinburgh) is a political campaigner. He was previously Chairperson of the Scottish Youth Parliament. On launch night, he was chosen by Matt Lucas, the hijacker at the time, to enter the house first and take part in a secret mission. His secret mission was to wear an ear piece through which Matt could speak to him and tell him what to do / say to each housemate as they entered the house. If he passed his mission he would win immunity from every eviction and a party for his fellow housemates. If he failed he would be up for every eviction. He passed and won himself a place in the final week. John was the winner of the series, taking 53.9% of the final vote.

In April 2008, he was appointed as a member of the Commission on Scottish Devolution. At the 2010 United Kingdom general election, John stood as the Lib Dem candidate in East Kilbride, Strathaven and Lesmahagow constituency. He finished fourth of six candidates, with 5,052 votes (9.9%).

=== Latoya Satnarine ===
Latoya Linette Satnarine (born 8 November 1987 in London) is a professional dancer who has appeared in over 20 music videos for artists including Madonna, and was also booked for a Mariah Carey concert tour. In 2007 she was nominated for the Best Female Dancer in the Dance Off Awards. Latoya has appeared dancing in over 20 music videos for artists including Madonna, Jamelia and Craig David amongst others. She says she is most proud of being booked as a concert dancer for Mariah Carey, as Carey doesn't usually use British dancers. On Day 21, in a surprise eviction Latoya became the fourth housemate to be evicted.

=== Liam Young ===
Liam Young (born 1 November 1988 in Widnes) was the registered director of a website services company called OxyUK Technologies Limited. Liam claimed to be bisexual and was the second housemate to be evicted on Day 16, in a double eviction.

=== Nathan Fagan-Gayle ===
Nathan Abraham Fagan-Gayle (born 1986, London), also known by his stage name Starboy Nathan, is an R&B singer and songwriter. He released his first album, "Masterpiece" in 2006. In 2007 he was nominated for the Best R&B Act at the MOBO Awards and is an Urban Music Awards winner. Having achieved a top 40 hit, Nathan already has a critically acclaimed album under his belt, entitled Masterpiece. Nathan pens his own music and also counts rapping and music producing amongst his talents. Nathan had sung with Alicia Keys at the age of 15 years, and has interviewed her for his school. On Day 26 Nathan was evicted, coming in sixth place.

In 2012, he made it to judges' houses on the ninth series of The X Factor but Nicole Scherzinger chose not to take him through to the live finals.

=== Victor Arata ===
Vittorio "Victor" Arata (born April 1988, Birmingham) is a professional circus performer. He and his sister Emilia perform as a double-act at the Palazzo Variety Show in Berlin. Before entering the house the pair appeared on the talent show When Will I Be Famous? hosted by Graham Norton where they went on to win the £10,000 prize. The contortionist acts he performs with his sister are extreme and carry a high risk – Victor has broken an elbow (which now contains a metal screw), his knee and his fingers. Emilia and Victor's mother Carmen is a trainer on Sky One reality show Cirque de Celebrite. He speaks fluent Italian. On Day 16 he became the third person to be evicted with 32% of the public vote. This was a double eviction. His sister, Emilia and close friend Jeremy survived the double eviction and both landed in the Top 5 in the finale, with his sister taking runner-up.

=== Celebrity Hijackers ===
The celebrity "hijackers" took on the role of Big Brother on one-day contracts.

Celebrity Hijacker	Famous for	Day Hijacked
Matt Lucas	Comedian and Little Britain star	Day 1
Matt Lucas	Comedian and Little Britain star	Day 2
Ian Wright	Ex-footballer and TV presenter	Day 3
Alan Cumming	Actor	Day 4
Kelly Osbourne	Singer and television presenter	Day 5
Russell Brand	Comedian/actor and ex-Big Brother's Big Mouth presenter	Day 6
John McCririck	Horse racing pundit and Celebrity Big Brother 3 housemate.	Day 7
Janet Street-Porter	British editor and media personality.	Day 8
Peaches Geldof	DJ act Trash Pussies	Day 9
Fifi Brown	DJ act Trash Pussies	Day 9
Andy McNab	ex-SAS sergeant	Day 10
Chris Moyles & Aled Haydn Jones	BBC Radio 1 DJ	Day 11
Brian Sewell	Art historian	Day 12
Joan Rivers	Comedian	Day 13
Keith Lemon	Aliases of comedian Leigh Francis of Bo' Selecta! fame	Day 14
Craig David	Aliases of comedian Leigh Francis of Bo' Selecta! fame	Day 14
Denise van Outen	TV presenter and musical star	Day 15
Scott Mills	BBC Radio 1 DJ	Day 16
Claire Cooper	Hollyoaks actresses (three of the McQueen sisters)	Day 17
Jennifer Metcalfe	Hollyoaks actresses (three of the McQueen sisters)	Day 17
Gemma Merna	Hollyoaks actresses (three of the McQueen sisters)	Day 17
Mathew Horne	Comedians and Big Brother's Big Mouth hosts	Day 18
James Corden	Comedians and Big Brother's Big Mouth hosts	Day 18
Mackenzie Crook	Actor	Day 19
Nicole Appleton	Two members of girl group All Saints	Day 20
Melanie Blatt	Two members of girl group All Saints	Day 20
Roseanne Barr	Comedian and sitcom star	Day 21
Jimmy Carr	Comedian and TV presenter	Day 22
Malcolm McLaren	Ex manager of the Sex Pistols	Day 23
Kate Lawler	Radio presenter, DJ and Big Brother 3 winner	Day 24
Jonathan Jacob	Big Brother's Little Brother Myspace competition winner	Day 25
Dermot O'Leary	Big Brother's Little Brother and Big Brother: Celebrity Hijack host	Day 25
Amelle Berrabah	Girl group Sugababes	Day 25
Keisha Buchanan	Girl group Sugababes	Day 25
Heidi Range	Girl group Sugababes	Day 25

- Jake and Dinos Chapman were reported to be hijackers but pulled out of the show.
- Paula Abdul also agreed to hijack the house but had to pull out due to scheduling conflicts.
- There was no celebrity hijacker on the final day, day 26.

== Nominations table ==
	Day 5	Day 13	Day 18	Day 21	Final Day 26		Nominations received
John	Victor, Jeremy	No nominations	Nathan, Jeremy	Jeremy, Nathan	Winner (Day 26)		N/A
Emilia	Jade, Liam	No nominations	Latoya, Anthony	Anthony, Nathan	Runner-up (Day 26)		8
Amy	Victor, Emilia	No nominations	Calista, Latoya	Calista, Nathan	Third place (Day 26)		2
Anthony	Victor, Liam	Victor	Emilia, Nathan	Jay, Jeremy	Fourth place (Day 26)		2
Jeremy	Jade, Calista	No nominations	Latoya, Calista	Calista, Jay	Fifth place (Day 26)		12
Nathan	Jade, Victor	No nominations	Calista, Emilia	Amy, Emilia	Sixth place (Day 26)		6
Calista	Victor, Jeremy	No nominations	Latoya, Nathan	Amy, Jeremy	Evicted (Day 23)		7
Jay	Victor, Jade	No nominations	Jeremy, Emilia	Emilia, Jeremy	Evicted (Day 23)		2
Latoya	Jeremy, Emilia	No nominations	Emilia, Jeremy	Evicted (Day 21)			4
Victor	Jade, Calista	No nominations	Evicted (Day 16)				9
Liam	Victor, Jeremy	No nominations	Evicted (Day 16)				2
Jade	Victor, Jeremy	Evicted (Day 9)					5
Nomination note	1	1, 2	1	1, 3	4		
Against public vote	Jade, Jeremy, Victor	Emilia, Jeremy, Liam, Victor	Emilia, Latoya	Amy, Calista, Emilia, Jay, Jeremy, Nathan	Amy, Anthony, Emilia, Jeremy, John, Nathan		
Evicted	Jade; 51.2% to evict	Liam; 44% to evict	Latoya; 56% to evict	Jay; 30% to evict	Nathan; 5.4% (out of 6)	Amy; 21.9% (out of 4)	
Evicted	Jade; 51.2% to evict	Liam; 44% to evict	Latoya; 56% to evict	Jay; 30% to evict	Jeremy; 15.6% (out of 6)	Amy; 21.9% (out of 4)	
Evicted	Jade; 51.2% to evict	Liam; 44% to evict	Latoya; 56% to evict	Jay; 30% to evict	Jeremy; 15.6% (out of 6)	Emilia; 46.1% (out of 2)	
Evicted	Jade; 51.2% to evict	Victor; 32% to evict	Latoya; 56% to evict	Calista; 25% to evict	Anthony; 21.6% (out of 4)	Emilia; 46.1% (out of 2)	
Evicted	Jade; 51.2% to evict	Victor; 32% to evict	Latoya; 56% to evict	Calista; 25% to evict	John; 53.9% to win		

Notes

- ^1Celebrity hijacker Matt Lucas set John a secret mission on Day 1. Wearing a hidden earpiece, John had to do and say everything that Matt instructed him to do without the housemates knowing he was on a secret task. Success meant a guaranteed place in the final, whilst failure meant automatic eviction every single time. John passed the task, guaranteeing himself a place in the final.
- ^2When Amy won a task on Day 10 she won immunity from this week's eviction. She also got to choose another housemate to be immune. She chose Anthony. Finally, due to losing the task against Amy, Anthony had to put one housemate up for eviction and he chose Victor. On Day 13, celebrity hijacker Joan Rivers selected Emilia, Jeremy and Liam to also face the public vote. It was a double eviction, meaning two housemates would be evicted.
- ^3The housemates nominated live. They each had two minutes to go to a private area and write down their two nominations. They were not obliged to give reasons for their nominations. They then all announced their nominations to each other at the dining table. Also, because of a double eviction planned that week, it was the three or more housemates with the most nominations that would go up rather than the normal two or more. Had there been no double eviction, Nathan and Jeremy would have been the only two up.
- ^4There were no nominations in the final week, instead the public voted for who they wanted to win the show. The housemate with the most votes would go on to win the show.

== Daily summary ==
Day 1	Tasks	On Day 1, John was set a task to do whatever the hijacker told him to do through an earpiece. He completed the task and thereby won himself a place in the final, as well as a party for the rest of the housemates.
Day 1	Hijacker	Matt Lucas
Day 2	Tasks	On Day 2, Big Brother asked for the three housemates who had bonded the most to come to the diary room. The group chose Anthony, Jeremy and Nathan. They had to take part in a number of tasks, such as baking a cake while linking arms. On Day 2, Big Brother asked all housemates to showcase their special talents in a short presentation. After watching each other, housemates were told to order themselves from most talented to least talented – with Calista being named most talented and John being chosen as the least talented.
Day 2	Hijacker	Matt Lucas
Day 3	Tasks	On Day 3, the housemates took part in tasks to test their senses. In the first part of the task, Housemates competed in pairs. One housemate would wear headphones to block out noise, whilst the other acted out sound effect for them to guess. In the second part of the task, the housemates took turns to try to score penalties whilst wearing blacked out goggles.
Day 3	Hijacker	Ian Wright
Day 4	Tasks	On Day 4, the housemates were given stereotypical movie characters to play by the hijacker. They had to remain in character throughout the day, and then put on a short play at the end of the day. The hijacker failed them for not working as a team.
Day 4	Hijacker	Alan Cumming
Day 5	Tasks	On Day 5, the housemates took part in a moshing challenge.
Day 5	Hijacker	Kelly Osbourne
Day 6	Tasks	On Day 6, an actor, in the guise of a disgruntled cameraman, broke into the house and staged a sit in on the hijackers command. This was to gauge how the housemates would react to an unexpected situation.
Day 6	Hijacker	Russell Brand
Day 7	Tasks	On Day 7, Jade was shown footage of Victor talking about behind her back in the Diary Room. She was told by Big Brother not to tell anyone about what she had seen. Later Victor was shown the same footage. He was told that he would have to be nice to Jade for the entire day without telling anyone about his task.
Day 7	Hijacker	John McCririck
Day 8	Tasks	On Day 8, the housemates worked in groups in a TV related task.
Day 8	Hijacker	Janet Street Porter
Day 9	Tasks	On Day 9, The housemates took part in a Battle of the Bands. 6 Housemates formed an Emo band, whilst the other 6 formed a Nu-Rave band. The Emo band consisting of Amy, Emilia, Jeremy, John, Liam and Nathan won the task and were rewarded with a silent disco.
Day 9	Exits	Jade was evicted with 51.2%
Day 9	Hijackers	Peaches Geldof And Fifi Brown
Day 10	Tasks	On Day 10, Amy and Anthony were "lifted" from the house in an early morning SAS raid. Their task was to not give away a code previously given to them by Big Brother. They were interrogated in secluded room until Anthony gave up his code. Amy was the winner of the task and awarded a £5,000 cash prize, as well as immunity from the next eviction. She was also given the chance to pick another housemate to receive immunity. She picked Anthony. Anthony was then asked to pick a housemate who would automatically face eviction. He chose Victor.
Day 10	Hijacker	Andy McNab
Day 11	Tasks	On Day 11, the housemates took part in a Pub Quiz. Teams led by Nathan and John competed against a team led by the hijacker. As both housemates teams failed to beat the hijacker's team, they failed the task. However, as John's team scored more than Nathan's, John was awarded the chance to have a drink with the hijacker in a secret room. Here he was awarded the additional prize of a 3-minute phonecall home, however John decided to save 1 minute of talk time to give to Anthony.
Day 11	Hijacker	Chris Moyles
Day 12	Tasks	On Day 12, the housemates had to cook a 4 course meal. They then had to attend a dinner party with a cross dressing theme.
Day 12	Hijacker	Brian Sewell
Day 13	Tasks	On Day 13, the housemates eligible for eviction had to convince the hijacker why they shouldn't be put up for the public vote. Emilia, Jeremy and Liam were chosen to face eviction. Later on the housemates had to dress up in their eviction outfits and put on a fashion show.
Day 13	Hijacker	Joan Rivers
Day 14	Tasks	On Day 14, the housemates had to come up with a new business idea and present it to the hijacker. Amy, Anthony and Latoya were the winners. Later on, the housemates had to dress up as Bo' Selecta character, Craig David. Their task was to look after his pet Kestrel, Kes, and sing his song "Soda Pop". The house failed the task, after Emilia briefly put the plastic Kestrel in the hot tub.
Day 14	Hijacker	Keith Lemon
Day 15	Tasks	On Day 15, the housemates had to take on particular musical traits. Some had to dance wherever they went, other had to sing all their words. The winners were Calista and John.
Day 15	Hijacker	Denise Van Outen
Day 16	Tasks	On Day 16, the housemates were initially told they would take part in a Life Drawing task. However, when Jay went to the Diary Room to collect supplies, it was revealed that the real task was to annoy Jay as much as possible, without him realising it was a task. The housemates passed, with Jay and Jeremy (who was dubbed the most annoying housemate) rewarded with a special meal. Later on, the housemates took part in the Channel 4 programme Cookalong:Live (part of the Food Fight series), where they had to produce a 3 course meal under the guidance of Gordon Ramsay.
Day 16	Exits	Liam was evicted with 44% of the public vote and Victor was evicted with 32%
Day 16	Hijacker	Scott Mills
Day 17	Tasks	On Day 17, the three chose Anthony, Jeremy and Nathan to compete to win a date with the 3 hijackers. Anthony was declared the winner of the task. As Latoya and John helped Anthony prepare for his date they received a prize of champagne and cake.
Day 17	Hijackers	The McQueen Sisters
Day 18	Tasks	On Day 18, the housemates were joined in the house by the hijackers. After a tape was played into the house of them saying mean things during Jade's eviction, the hijackers worked to try to gain the forgiveness of the housemates. As the housemates unanimously decided to forgive the hijackers, they won the task and a luxury menu.
Day 18	Hijackers	Mat Horne and James Corden
Day 19	Tasks	On Day 19, the housemates competed in a Nerd Day task. Split into groups, they were assigned various geeky tasks, including battle reenactments, model building, bird watching and rubber band ball making. Jeremy was named as the geekiest and the housemates passed the task.
Day 19	Hijackers	Mackenzie Crook
Day 20	Tasks	On Day 20, the hijackers assigned the task "Big Brother's Big Brain" where housemates were put on the spot twice and asked questions about their talents and one of their interests as stated on their applications. Anthony won by answering 11 questions correctly.
Day 20	Hijackers	Nicole Appleton & Melanie Blatt
Day 21	Tasks	On Day 21, the housemates were split into pairs of two and asked to perform a stand-up comedy routine at "Big Brother's Comedy Club", with one housemate writing the routine and the other presenting it. The housemates passed their task, and were rewarded by a film screening in the living area, where Dermot appeared halfway on-screen with a surprise eviction.
Day 21	Exits	Latoya was evicted with 56% of the public vote
Day 21	Hijackers	Roseanne Barr
Day 22	Tasks	On Day 22, housemates had to wear a clock around their neck and announce the time and their activity during the morning in a Geordie accent, imitating Big Brother narrator Marcus Bentley. Jimmy Carr decided that Amy gave the most effort and rewarded her with a pocket watch. As a consolation prize, he gave all housemates mugs with their names written on them. They also had to rank their fellow housemates in order of most to least based on three categories: looks, intelligence and talent. Afterwards, they had to correctly identify which housemates were ranked more or less than each other on at least two of the categories, and the housemates passed the task. They also chose an animal which best represented them and were given costumes to wear.
Day 22	Hijackers	Jimmy Carr
Day 23	Tasks	Housemates were each assigned a large roll of cardboard which they had to unravel to create a maze. They then flattened the rolls onto the floor and had to strip naked (though all housemates refused to do so, all but John and Amy did it in their underwear) cover themselves in paint and rolled around on the cardboard to create body images. The card was later used as wallpaper in the living area. Later the housemates had a wine-tasting session with the hijacker that day Malcolm McLaren. McLaren had asked for this to be broadcast in black and white which it was.
Day 23	Exits	Jay was evicted with 30% of the public vote and Calista was evicted with 25%
Day 23	Hijackers	Malcolm McLaren
Day 24	Tasks	All housemates had to dress up as each other and pretend to be another housemate for 30 minutes. John swapped with Emilia, Nathan with Amy and Anthony with Jeremy. The hijacker that day, Kate Lawler later entered the house with an Indian take-away. While in the house, she lied to Anthony and told him that evicted housemate, Calista Robertson, had sold a story about him to a tabloid newspaper which was "very personal".
Day 24	Hijackers	Kate Lawler
Day 25	Tasks	
Day 25	Hijackers	Jonathan Jacob (the Myspace competition winner to hijack the House), Dermot O'Leary and The Sugababes (Amelle, Heidi and Keisha)
Day 26	Tasks	
Day 26	Exits	6th place Nathan,5th place Jeremy,4th place Anthony,3rd Place Amy, Runner-up Emilia and The Winner Is John.

== Production ==
=== Eye Logo ===
The "eye" logo used for Big Brother 8 was adapted to include the star used in celebrity versions and a splatter of purple paint across it to signify that the eye itself had been "hijacked". The colour of the splat is the same purple used for the E4 logo. The logo was unveiled on 3 December 2007.

=== Sponsorship ===
The series was sponsored by Virgin Mobile, who took over from parent company Virgin Media, the sponsors of Big Brother 8.

=== Broadcasts ===
The majority of Big Brother: Celebrity Hijack was broadcast on E4, with the first hour of the launch show being broadcast on E4 and Channel 4. The live launch, eviction shows, finale and Big Brother's Little Brother were hosted by Dermot O'Leary – who had been the host of Little Brother since Big Brother 2 in 2001. In 2007, O'Leary announced his departure from Big Brother, and Celebrity Hijack would be his last. E4 broadcast live coverage from the house, as well as Big Brother's Big Mouth, which was hosted by Mathew Horne and James Corden, who were guest hosts during Big Brother 8 the previous summer. They would not return for any subsequent series of Big Brother or Celebrity Big Brother.

The launch of the show was broadcast on both Channel 4 and E4; subsequent shows including the final were only shown on E4. The live launch, evictions, and special episodes were hosted by Dermot O'Leary and introduced the first celebrity hijacker. Like the main series, live footage aired through the night. Big Brother's Little Brother was hosted by Dermot O'Leary. It was shown Monday-Friday at 7.30 pm and Sundays at 7 pm. It was O'Leary's last series as he departed from the show to focus on his X Factor duties. Big Brother's Big Mouth was hosted by James Corden and Mathew Horne. Big Mouth aired Monday-Thursday at 10 p.m. and Fridays at 10.30 pm. Corden and Horne were chosen as permanent hosts after being guest hosts during Big Brother 8. Diary Room Uncut aired on Saturdays at 10 pm. This year however there was no online live feed on Channel 4 or their sponsor Virgin Media's site. Also, as the series progressed the amount of live coverage on E4 was shortened.

== The House ==
Although much of the house was the same as the house used for Big Brother 8 there were some changes. The bedroom was painted green. The fridge was brought inside the house (during the main series the house had an "everything not where it should be" theme which saw the fridge in the garden). Many of the walls had pictures on of various things such as monkeys holding cameras and a shopping trolley on the door to the store room. The pool was replaced with a hot tub due to the show being broadcast in January. The sofas were changed to be all purple, in keeping in the E4 theme of the house. There were also splatters of purple paint on the wall similar to those on the logo. The house was also given a new timber floor opposed to the pink carpet used for the main series. The bath was moved to the bathroom. The bedroom saw the biggest changes of all the rooms in the house. It was given a whole new set of furniture, with individual beds, instead of the four-person beds from the summer. The walls were painted green, some with wallpaper of skyscrapers. A gym (including exercise bicycles and a treadmill) was built, which could be entered from the bedroom. Two walls are orange, two are giant photos of mountains overlooking a lake. The hair dryers were removed and a bath was installed. The shower remained unchanged. The diary room chair remained the same except for the fact that the lights inside the chair were coloured purple to stay with the E4 theme. A hidden spiral staircase was used when Andy McNab hijacked the house to reach interrogation room 2. The spiral staircase was again used when Chris Moyles hijacked the house to reach a secret bar. It was accessed from a secret door inside the bedroom toilet. There was also another room that could be accessed from the storage room. It was used for tasks such as Janet Street-Porter's television task and Mathew Horne and James Corden's love room. As well, the vestibule that was used in the previous civilian series was removed, therefore the doors that originally led into the vestibule from the stairs now led into the main house.
