= Celebrity Big Brother (British series 5) racism controversy =

Controversy in British TV series, 2007

The Celebrity Big Brother 5 racism controversy arose during the fifth series of Channel 4's reality television programme Celebrity Big Brother in January 2007. It centred on the treatment of the Indian actress Shilpa Shetty by several fellow housemates, particularly Jade Goody, Danielle Lloyd, Jo O'Meara, Jackiey Budden and Jack Tweed. Remarks broadcast during the series about Shetty's name, accent, nationality and cooking led to allegations of racism and prompted a backlash in both Britain and India.

Tensions in the house escalated over several days and culminated in a confrontation between Shetty and Goody, after which Big Brother issued a formal warning over racist behaviour or anything that could be seen as racist. Goody later apologised and was evicted by public vote, while Shetty went on to win the series.

The controversy quickly moved beyond entertainment coverage. Complaints to Ofcom rose to more than 44,500, then a record for a British television broadcast, and viewing figures increased sharply as the row intensified. The affair attracted extensive press attention, drew comment from politicians in the United Kingdom and India, and triggered a commercial backlash against both the programme and some of its participants. Carphone Warehouse suspended and later ended its sponsorship agreement with Channel 4, while the broadcaster initially defended its handling of the series before commissioning an internal review.

After the programme ended, Hertfordshire Constabulary investigated allegations of racist behaviour in the house but brought no charges. Ofcom later found that Channel 4 had breached the Broadcasting Code in its handling of several broadcasts and identified a serious breakdown in compliance and editorial control, directing the broadcaster to air summaries of its findings during the following series of Big Brother. The controversy also influenced the subsequent handling of the Big Brother franchise and later became a subject of academic discussion in work on race, celebrity culture and reality television.

== Background ==
Celebrity Big Brother 5 was the fifth celebrity series of Channel 4's reality television programme Celebrity Big Brother, in which contestants lived together under constant camera surveillance and faced eviction by public vote. The series began on 3 January 2007 and ended on 28 January after 26 days. Channel 4 broadcast a nightly highlights programme drawn from the previous 24 hours in the house, alongside live coverage and a morning repeat from which potentially objectionable material could be removed for pre-watershed transmission.

The series began with eleven housemates on 3 January, among them Indian actor Shilpa Shetty, model Danielle Lloyd and singer Jo O'Meara. Big Brother 3 finalist Jade Goody entered the house on 5 January with her mother Jackiey Budden and boyfriend Jack Tweed. According to Channel 4, the idea of introducing Goody and her family had originally been considered for Big Brother 7 but was deferred until Celebrity Big Brother 5.

== Broadcast incidents ==
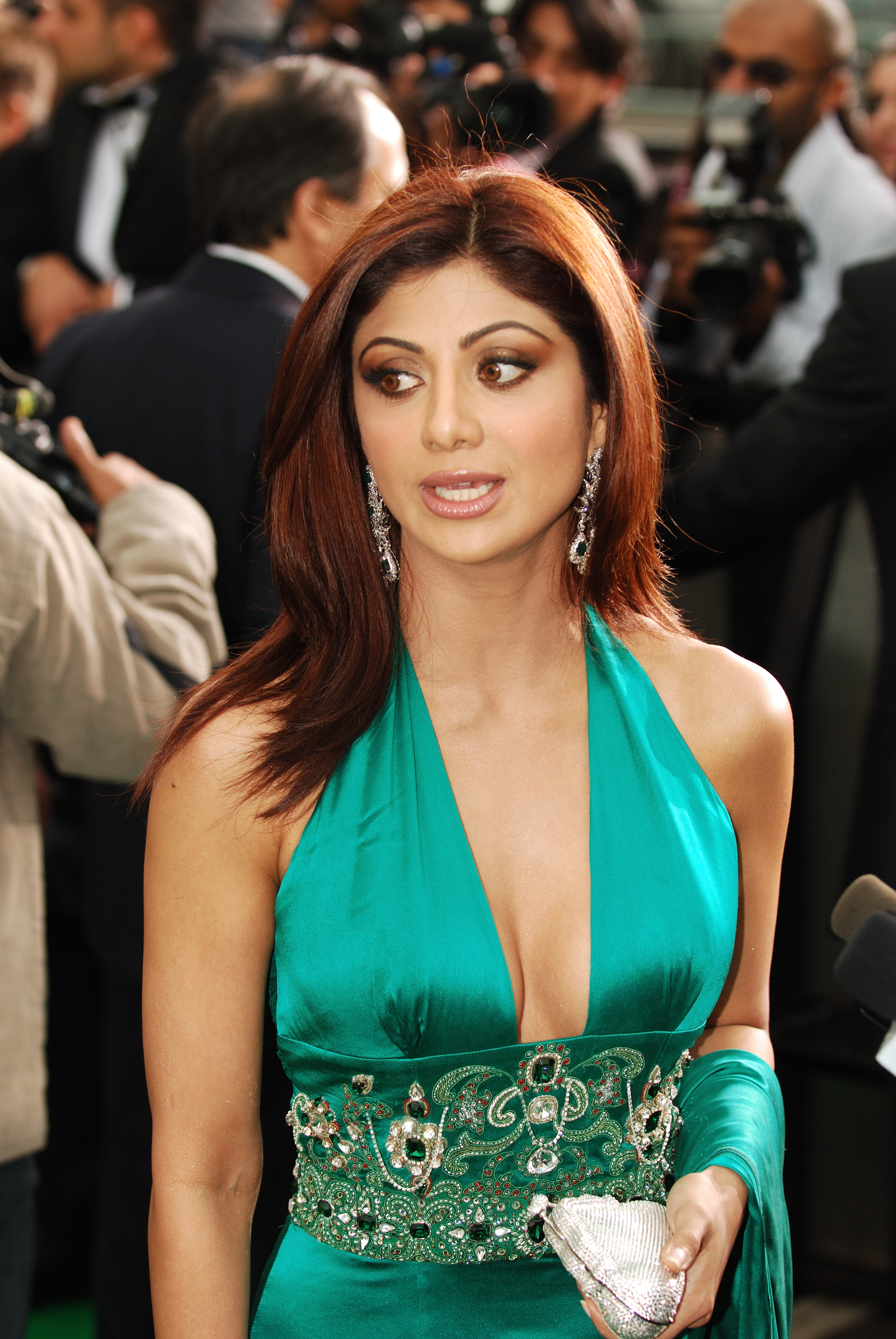
Celebrity Big Brother 5 winner Shilpa Shetty

Tensions involving Shilpa Shetty developed early in the series. Jackiey Budden said that she could not pronounce Shetty's first name and instead referred to her as "Princess" and, on one occasion, as "the Indian". During Budden's eviction interview on 10 January, presenter Davina McCall challenged her over not saying "Shilpa" correctly but did not address her use of the phrase "the Indian". After Budden's eviction, Jack Tweed also made derogatory remarks about Shetty in a private conversation with Jade Goody, referring to her as a "cunt" in remarks that were bleeped in the broadcast.

The dispute escalated after Shetty cooked chicken for the housemates. Complaining that the food was undercooked, Jo O'Meara said that people in India were "all thin" because "they're sick all the time, because they're ill". Danielle Lloyd asked whether people in India ate with their hands. O'Meara also complained that Shetty touched food on other housemates' plates and mocked her accent, and Lloyd said that she did not know "where her fingers have been".

Tensions between the housemates reached a peak on 16 January during an argument over Oxo cubes. Goody told Shetty that she was "no fucking princess here" and said that she needed "a day in the slums". Shetty responded that Goody needed etiquette lessons and said that her "claim to fame was [Big Brother]". Lloyd and O'Meara laughed during the exchange, and afterwards Lloyd said that Shetty should "fuck off home".

In the aftermath of the row, Shetty asked other housemates whether they were "reacting to me like this because I'm Indian" and told fellow housemate Cleo Rocos that she believed racism was a factor, though she later told Big Brother that she did not regard Goody as racist.

On the morning of 17 January, Goody referred to her as "Shilpa Poppadom". In the Diary Room, Goody said that she had not intended the remark to be racist, and on 18 January Big Brother formally warned her that it would not tolerate "any racist behaviour or anything that could be seen as racist behaviour". Later that day, Goody apologised to Shetty and the two discussed the dispute in an effort to reconcile.

Goody was evicted by public vote on 19 January. Shetty went on to win the series on 28 January.

== Reactions and response ==
=== Public and press response ===
Public complaints rose sharply as the controversy escalated. On 15 January, Ofcom was reported to have received about 200 complaints alleging racism. After the broadcast of Jo O'Meara and Danielle Lloyd's remarks about food and illness in India, the total rose to 3,500 complaints to Ofcom, with a further 1,000 made directly to Channel 4. By 16 January, Ofcom had received 10,000 complaints, and two days later Ofcom chief executive Ed Richards said that the total had reached 25,000, which he described as a British television record. By 20 January, complaints to Ofcom had reached 40,000, and Ofcom later gave a final total of just over 44,500 complaints. In 2022, Ofcom said that the 2007 Celebrity Big Brother case remained its most complained-about investigation to result in a breach finding.

Viewing figures also rose during the controversy. The highlights programme broadcast on 16 January attracted 4.5 million viewers, a share of 18 per cent of the available audience. The following night's episode drew 5.2 million viewers, and Goody's eviction on 19 January averaged 7.8 million viewers and peaked at 8.8 million, the highest audience in the history of Celebrity Big Brother to that point.

The controversy also generated extensive press coverage in Britain and abroad. On 21 January, The New York Times reported that it had generated more than 300 newspaper articles in Britain, 1,200 in English-language newspapers worldwide and 3,900 foreign-language news articles, as well as 22,000 blog posts online. Reuters reported that Indian editorial reaction was not limited to condemnation of the programme: editorials in the Hindustan Times, the Indian Express and Navbharat Times used the affair to reflect on colour prejudice and other forms of discrimination within India itself. In Britain, coverage became increasingly critical of Jade Goody, Danielle Lloyd and Jo O'Meara as complaints mounted and Channel 4 came under growing scrutiny over its handling of the programme.

Tabloid coverage was particularly hostile. The Daily Mirror ran a front-page editorial headlined "Beauty V Bigot" and described Goody as a "racist bully"; it later referred to her as a "vile racist". The Sun likewise ran a 19 January front page headed "Evict Face of Hate", urging readers to vote for Goody's eviction and printing the programme's premium-rate telephone number.

Some reports also misquoted or misdescribed specific incidents, including Goody's "day in the slums" remark and claims that Jack Tweed had used the word "paki" rather than "cunt".

=== Political and diplomatic reaction ===
The controversy quickly moved beyond entertainment coverage into British politics and prompted comment in India as well as the United Kingdom. On 16 January, Leicester East MP Keith Vaz tabled an early day motion in the House of Commons expressing concern about the comments made about Shilpa Shetty, arguing that Big Brother had a responsibility to prevent racist behaviour in the house, and calling on the programme to remind housemates that such behaviour was unacceptable.

The row also coincided with a visit by the Chancellor of the Exchequer Gordon Brown to India. Asked about the programme in Bangalore, Brown said that he wanted Britain to be seen as "a country of fairness and tolerance" and condemned anything that detracted from that reputation.

In India, government representatives said that the matter had been taken up with the United Kingdom through diplomatic channels. Reuters reported that the Ministry of External Affairs said India had raised the case with the British government through the British High Commission in New Delhi. According to the Hindustan Times, minister of state for external affairs Anand Sharma said India would take "appropriate action" after receiving the full details, and foreign ministry spokesman Navtej Sarna said the matter had been taken up with the UK through the High Commission in London.

Reports in India and abroad also described protests by Shetty's supporters, including the burning of effigies in Patna, and warnings from some Indian politicians that the affair risked becoming a diplomatic issue.

=== Commercial backlash ===
The controversy triggered a swift commercial backlash against both the programme and some of the housemates. On 18 January, Carphone Warehouse suspended its sponsorship of Celebrity Big Brother with immediate effect, saying that the behaviour shown in the house was incompatible with the company's opposition to racism and bullying, and in March it permanently ended its wider sponsorship agreement with Channel 4. Former Channel 4 chairman Vanni Treves also called for the series to be cancelled.

The backlash also affected individual housemates' commercial ties. On 18 and 19 January, The Perfume Shop withdrew Jade Goody's perfume Shh... from sale and motorcycle insurer Bennetts ended its arrangement with Danielle Lloyd. On 25 January, HarperCollins cancelled the planned paperback release of Goody's autobiography Jade: My Autobiography.

=== Channel 4 response ===
Channel 4 initially defended its handling of the series. In a statement issued on 16 January, it said that bullying and racial abuse were taken "extremely seriously" by both Channel 4 and Endemol, but added that Shilpa Shetty had not raised concerns about racist language and that housemates were encouraged to resolve conflicts among themselves. The following day, the broadcaster denied that there had been any "overt racial abuse or racist behaviour", though it acknowledged what it described as a cultural and class clash between Shetty and several of the British women in the house. On the day of Goody's eviction, Channel 4 cancelled the usual crowd and press conference outside the house and announced that profits from that week's eviction vote would be donated to charity.

On 22 January, Channel 4's board met to discuss the affair and commissioned a review of the editorial and compliance procedures supporting Big Brother. In its subsequent internal review, the broadcaster concluded that serious offence had been caused by the broadcast of several comments made by housemates and accepted that its interventions had been too slow and insufficiently forceful. The review recommended changes to compliance procedures, additional editorial oversight and revisions to the programme's rules.

== Investigations and rulings ==
=== Police inquiry ===
After Shilpa Shetty told fellow housemates that she believed some of the hostility towards her might be because she was Indian, Hertfordshire Constabulary opened an inquiry into allegations of racist behaviour in the house. On 18 January, the force said that it was reviewing programme footage and liaising with Ofcom and Endemol. It later confirmed that it had contacted Jade Goody and Jackiey Budden and would seek to speak to other housemates after they had left the house.

After the series ended, police received further information in the form of an anonymous note alleging that unbroadcast footage showed housemates singing a song containing a racial slur. Channel 4 said that police would need a court order to obtain unaired material from the programme.

On 9 March 2007, police announced that no charges would be brought. Following consultation with the Crown Prosecution Service, they concluded that, although the behaviour under investigation had been offensive, it did not meet the threshold for criminal prosecution. Police also said that four housemates had been interviewed, while two others had declined to speak to them.

=== Ofcom investigation and sanctions ===
Ofcom announced a formal investigation into the broadcasts while the series was still on air and continued its inquiry after the police investigation concluded. Channel 4 submitted its response in April, and Ofcom published its adjudication on 24 May 2007.

Ofcom found that Channel 4 had breached the Broadcasting Code in its handling of Jo O'Meara and Danielle Lloyd's remarks about cooking in India, Lloyd's comment that Shilpa Shetty should "fuck off home", and Jade Goody's use of the phrase "Shilpa Poppadom". In relation to the last of these, Ofcom also found that the 19 January pre-watershed re-versioned repeat was in breach because it retained both the "Shilpa Poppadom" remark and the accompanying Diary Room sequence. It also described Jackiey Budden's use of the expression "the Indian" as "deeply offensive", but concluded that Channel 4's handling of that incident meant the matter was resolved without a separate finding of breach.

During the investigation, Channel 4 supplied Ofcom with uncensored and untransmitted footage from the house confirming that Jack Tweed had used the word "cunt", not a racial slur, in one disputed exchange. The material also revealed previously unaired conversations from 16 January in which housemates discussed whether Lloyd had used the racial slur "Paki" and improvised limericks around what they called "the 'P' word". In a later Diary Room warning, Big Brother said that the rhyming words used in the game were references to the racial insult "Paki", and O'Meara and Tweed were formally warned over the incident.

Ofcom said that the existence of this footage, which a producer had logged as "racist" but not passed to Channel 4 at the time, demonstrated a serious breakdown in compliance and editorial control.

As a sanction, Ofcom directed Channel 4 to broadcast a summary of its findings on three occasions during Big Brother 8. Contemporary coverage described the ruling as a landmark decision and noted that Channel 4 avoided a financial penalty. Channel 4 accepted the ruling on the day it was published, saying that it had failed to intervene with sufficient promptness or force.

== Aftermath and legacy ==
=== Channel 4 and franchise legacy ===
The controversy had lasting consequences for the Big Brother franchise and prompted Channel 4 to tighten its handling of the programme. In the months that followed, the broadcaster adopted stricter compliance procedures and a more interventionist approach to potentially discriminatory language. Channel 4's internal review also recommended broader changes beyond Big Brother, including an additional editorial perspective on Channel output, stronger audience-monitoring and escalation procedures, and greater public-accountability mechanisms, as well as research and expert advice to inform future commissioning on racism and xenophobia.

This more interventionist approach was evident nine days into the next non-celebrity series, Big Brother 8, when contestant Emily Parr was removed after using the word "nigger" toward fellow housemate Charley Uchea. Contemporary reporting explicitly linked Channel 4's swift action to the scrutiny that had followed the Celebrity Big Brother 5 controversy, and the broadcaster's response was praised by racial-equality campaigners and politicians.

In August 2007, Channel 4 announced that Celebrity Big Brother would be rested in 2008 as part of a wider programming overhaul. Although the broadcaster presented the move as part of a broader strategy of "creative renewal", Channel 4 executives acknowledged that the events of January 2007 had contributed to the decision. The slot was filled instead by Big Brother: Celebrity Hijack, and when Celebrity Big Brother returned in January 2009, Channel 4 and the programme's producers said contestants had been explicitly briefed on the 2007 race row and warned about language and behaviour that would not be tolerated.

=== Participant responses ===
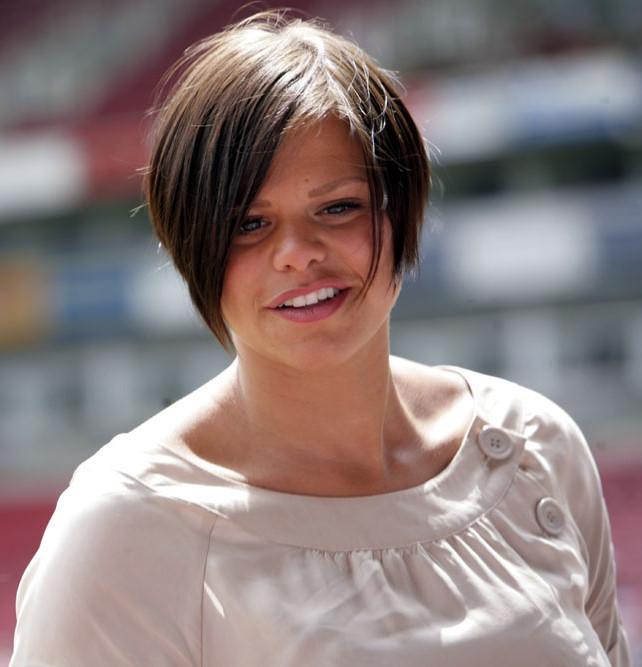
Jade Goody in 2007

After the series ended, the principal participants responded publicly in different ways. Goody apologised for her behaviour on the programme, said that she understood why her comments had been perceived as racist, and confirmed that she would donate her fee from Celebrity Big Brother to charity. She continued to deny that she was racist, but acknowledged that her conduct had caused offence.

After winning the series, Shetty said that Goody had "not meant to be racist" and that she did not want to leave Britain "putting anyone in trouble". By early February, she said of Goody, Danielle Lloyd and Jo O'Meara that "it's over and done with for me" and that they had "learnt their lesson".

Jo O'Meara also apologised publicly, saying on 2 February that she was sorry for any hurt she had caused Shetty and that she was "totally shattered" and afraid to return home after receiving death threats. Danielle Lloyd, by contrast, later argued that the programme had been unfairly edited, threatened legal action against Endemol, and considered making her own complaint to Ofcom.

=== Academic and cultural legacy ===
Writing soon after the broadcasts, Shehina Fazal argued that the affair prompted wider debate about race, racism and multiculturalism in Britain, while Usha Zacharias and Jane Arthurs placed it in a transnational and postcolonial context that highlighted the politics of race, class, gender and stardom in a global media economy.

Later scholarship often focused on the controversy's entanglement with celebrity culture and public confession. Su Holmes argued that Goody's role in the row was shaped by the celebrity persona constructed around her after her first appearance on Big Brother in 2002, when tabloid coverage had already marked her out through attacks on her appearance, class and perceived lack of education. Momin Rahman likewise examined the aftermath through the language of confession and apology, suggesting that arguments over whether Goody was "really" racist became bound up with questions of authenticity and celebrity rehabilitation.

Other scholars focused more directly on how racism was framed in public discussion of the affair. Damien W. Riggs and Clemence Due argued that commentary on the controversy, particularly in Davina McCall's post-eviction interviews, often displaced racism into questions of individual intent, perception and bullying, treating the housemates as "individuals in conflict" rather than confronting racism more directly. Lieve Gies framed the affair through questions of dignity, equality and respect, while Riggs elsewhere described the language used towards Shetty as an example of "(neo)colonial racism" drawing on colonial stereotypes and cultural hierarchies that continued to shape relations between Britain and India.

== Bibliography ==
- Adjudication of Ofcom Content Sanctions Committee – Channel Four Television Corporation in respect of its service Channel 4 (PDF) (Report). Ofcom. 24 May 2007.
- Channel 4 review of Celebrity Big Brother January 2007: Findings and recommendations (PDF) (Report). Channel 4. 24 May 2007 – via The Guardian.
- Fazal, Shehina (2007). "Channel 4 and Celebrity Big Brother 2007: multiculturalist or segregationist?" (PDF). Information, Society and Justice. 1 (1): 33–42. doi:10.3734/isj.2007.1104.
- Zacharias, Usha; Arthurs, Jane (2007). "Starring Race: Transnational cultural politics and the Shilpa-Jade episode". Feminist Media Studies. 7 (4): 455–469. doi:10.1080/14680770701631703.
- Holmes, Su (2009). "'Jade's Back, and This Time she's Famous': Narratives of Celebrity in the Celebrity Big Brother 'Race' Row". Entertainment and Sports Law Journal. 7 (1). doi:10.16997/eslj.54.
- Rahman, Momin (2008). "Jade's confession: racism and the dialectics of celebrity". Social Semiotics. 18 (2): 133–148. doi:10.1080/10350330802002143.
- Gies, Lieve (2009). "Celebrity Big Brother, Human Rights and Popular Culture". Entertainment and Sports Law Journal. 7 (1). doi:10.16997/eslj.49.
- Riggs, Damien W.; Due, Clemence (2010). "The management of accusations of racism in Celebrity Big Brother". Discourse & Society. 21 (3): 257–271. doi:10.1177/0957926509360652.
- Riggs, Damien W. (2009). "Poppadoms, princesses and privilege: Colonial relations in action in the Celebrity Big Brother household". In Clarke, R. (ed.). Celebrity Colonialism: Fame, Power and Representation in (Post)Colonial Cultures. Cambridge Scholars Publishing.
