= Do Without My Love =

Single by Nathan

from the album Masterpiece
- Released: 12 March 2007
- Recorded: 2006
- Genre: R&B
- Length: 3:46
- Label: Mona Records

Nathan singles chronology
"Cold as Ice" (2006)	"Do Without My Love" (2007)	"Caught Me Slippin" (2010)

"Do Without My Love" is a single from British R&B singer Nathan taken from his debut album Masterpiece. The single was released on 12 March 2007 as a Digital download in the United Kingdom. The song peaked at number 44 on the UK Singles Chart.

== Music video ==
A music video to accompany the release of "Do Without My Love" was first released onto YouTube on 5 December 2006 at a total length of three minutes and fifty-six seconds.

== Track listing ==
Digital download
No.	Title	Length
1.	"Do Without My Love" (Radio Edit)	3:46
2.	"Do Without My Love" (Rishi Rich Mix)	4:06
3.	"Do Without My Love" (Dubaholics / Betoko Dance Mix)	5:30
4.	"Do Without My Love" (Niteryders Dance Mix)	4:05
5.	"Do Without My Love" (Sly & Robbie Mix)	3:54

== Charts ==
=== Weekly charts ===
Chart (2007)	Peak position
UK Singles (OCC)	44
UK Hip Hop/R&B (OCC)	7

=== Year-end charts ===
Chart (2007)	Position
UK Urban (Music Week)	5

== Release history ==
Region	Date	Format	Label
United Kingdom	12 March 2007	Digital download	Mona Records
