= Danielle Lloyd =

English model (born 1983)

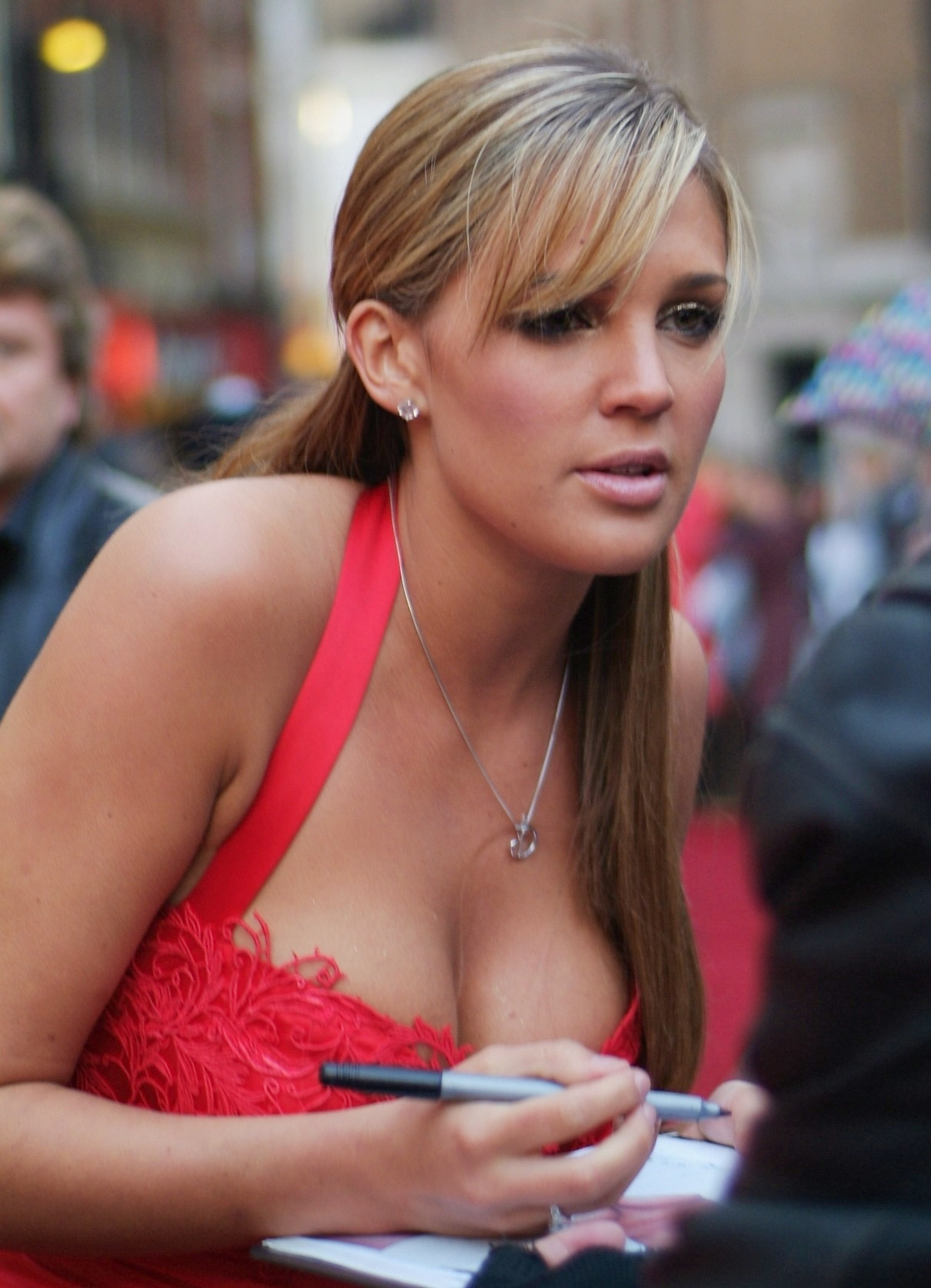
- Lloyd in 2007
- Born: 16 December 1983 (age 42); Liverpool, England
- Occupations: Model; television personality
- Spouses: Jamie O'Hara (m. 2012; div. 2014) Michael O'Neill (m. 2019)
- Children: 5
- Modelling information
- Height: 5 ft 7 in (1.70 m)
- Hair colour: Brunette
- Eye colour: Hazel
- Website: daniellelloyd.com

Danielle Lloyd (formerly O'Hara; born 16 December 1983) is an English model and beauty pageant titleholder who was crowned Miss England 2004 and Miss Great Britain 2006. Lloyd first rose to prominence when she was stripped of her Miss Great Britain title after posing nude in the December 2006 edition of Playboy magazine. Her Miss Great Britain title was reinstated in 2010.

In 2007, Lloyd appeared on the fifth series of the Channel 4 reality show Celebrity Big Brother, where she was involved in the Big Brother racism controversy. She won the celebrity edition of The Weakest Link in 2008 and Total Wipeout in 2010.

== Early life ==
Danielle Lloyd was born on 16 December 1983 in Liverpool, England. Upon finishing school, Lloyd decided to pursue a dual career in modelling and as a beautician specialising in massage. She is a former nail technician.

== Career ==
Lloyd was crowned Miss England on 17 July 2004, and competed at Miss World 2004. In February 2006, Lloyd was named Miss Great Britain 2006.

On 2 November 2006, she was stripped of her title "following recent claims in the press and magazines and the publicity given on the Playboy website for their next issue", according to the Miss Great Britain website.

Lloyd appeared in FHM magazine and was a finalist of Miss Maxim 2006.

In 2006, Lloyd made an appearance on BBC One's Test the Nation. She revealed that she thought a statue of former Prime Minister Winston Churchill was a statue for the first black President. Lloyd later would go on to win a special episode of The Weakest Link.

Lloyd joined Celebrity Big Brother on 3 January 2007, at the start of the series. Lloyd incurred significant negative publicity about her involvement, with Jade Goody and Jo O'Meara, in a racial controversy involving the racist targeting of Indian housemate Shilpa Shetty.

Lloyd donated her winnings from both Celebrity Big Brother and The Weakest Link to the Linda McCartney Centre located at the Royal Liverpool University Hospital.

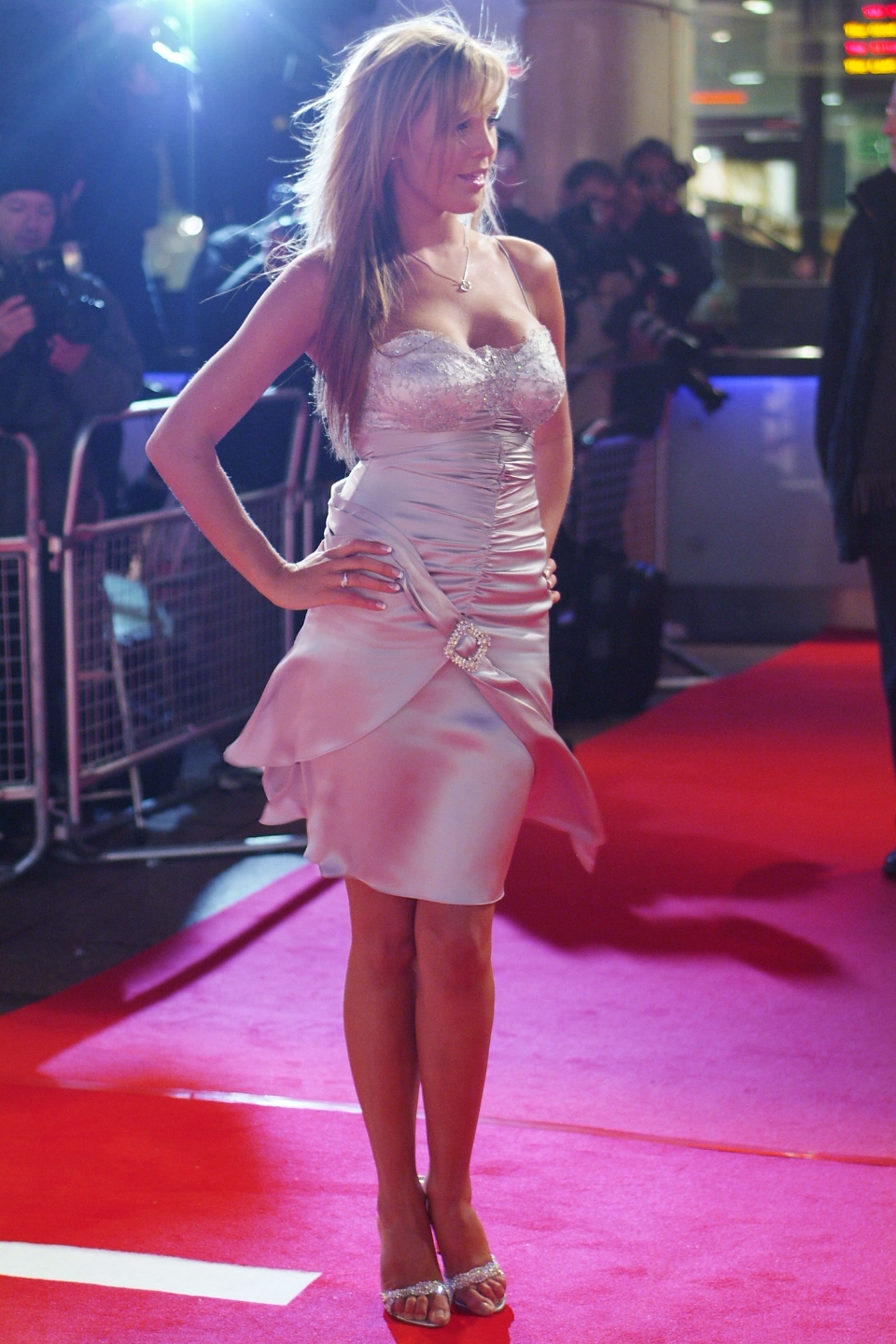
Lloyd in 2007

Lloyd has also appeared several times on the covers of men's magazines Maxim, Loaded, Nuts and Zoo Weekly, as well as featuring in FHM and Ice. She has also secured a contract as the face of Ladbrokes Poker.

In 2007, Lloyd launched a mobile phone safety campaign after her own mobile was stolen in a Liverpool club. The "Keep It Safe & Secure" (KISS) campaign, backed by the National Mobile Phone Crime Unit, encouraged mobile users to take greater safety precautions when using their phone. In December 2007, Lloyd released a workout DVD entitled Keep Fit, Look Fit.

Throughout 2007 and 2008, Lloyd made numerous television appearances including a guest spot on ITV2's WAGs Boutique and the celebrity edition of Gladiators. She also participated in the "Glamour Models Special" of The Weakest Link, winning £8,950.

Lloyd appeared in her own documentary, Dangerous Love: A Comic Relief Special (first broadcast on 3 March 2009), which examined the subject of violence against females in teen relationships. In the programme, she described the abuse she received (including a broken cheekbone) during her turbulent relationship and visited organisations funded by Comic Relief.

On 2 January 2010, Lloyd participated in a celebrity edition of Total Wipeout. She cleared all the rounds and went on to win the competition. In doing so, she raised £10,000 for the charity Guiding Light/The Lantern Project.

In December 2010, she appeared on a celebrity edition of Come Dine with Me on Channel 4. She received the highest average scores from the other contestants and won the competition. She donated her prize money to Bliss, a special care baby charity.

In 2014, Lloyd participated in celebrity show Splash!.

On 18 January 2015, Lloyd took part in celebrity talent show Get Your Act Together.

In 2023, Lloyd was recruit number 11 in Celebrity Series 5 of SAS: Who Dares Wins.

== Personal life ==
Lloyd married Jamie O'Hara on 26 May 2012. They had three sons together. She filed for divorce from O'Hara in 2014. Lloyd married electrician Michael O'Neill on 6 April 2019. They have one son and a daughter.

== Controversy ==
During her appearance on Celebrity Big Brother, Lloyd received significant negative publicity about her involvement, with Jade Goody and Jo O'Meara, in a racial controversy with Indian housemate Shilpa Shetty.

A large increase in complaints occurred after a conversation between Lloyd and O'Meara was shown, during which Lloyd mentioned that she did not like Shetty touching her food because she did not "know where her hands have been". Lloyd, O'Meara and Goody repeatedly maintained a belief that Shetty was "fake", and "a mole". Further complaints were made when Lloyd said she wanted Shetty to, "Fuck off home".

The tensions in the house came to a peak on Day 15, when an explosive argument between Shetty and Goody erupted, seemingly over stock cubes, was witnessed by a giggling O'Meara and Lloyd.

As a result of her appearance in Celebrity Big Brother, Lloyd lost six-figure modelling contracts with motorcycle insurance firm Bennetts and urban fashion label Rocawear.

Honorary titles
Preceded by Jackie Turner (2003)	Miss England; 2004	Succeeded by Hammasa Kohistani (2005)
Preceded by Emma Speller (2004); No contest (2005)	Miss Great Britain; Won 2006; Title Stripped 2006; Title Reinstated 2010	Succeeded by Rachael Tennent
