= Amy Jackson (artist) =

British artist (born 1986)

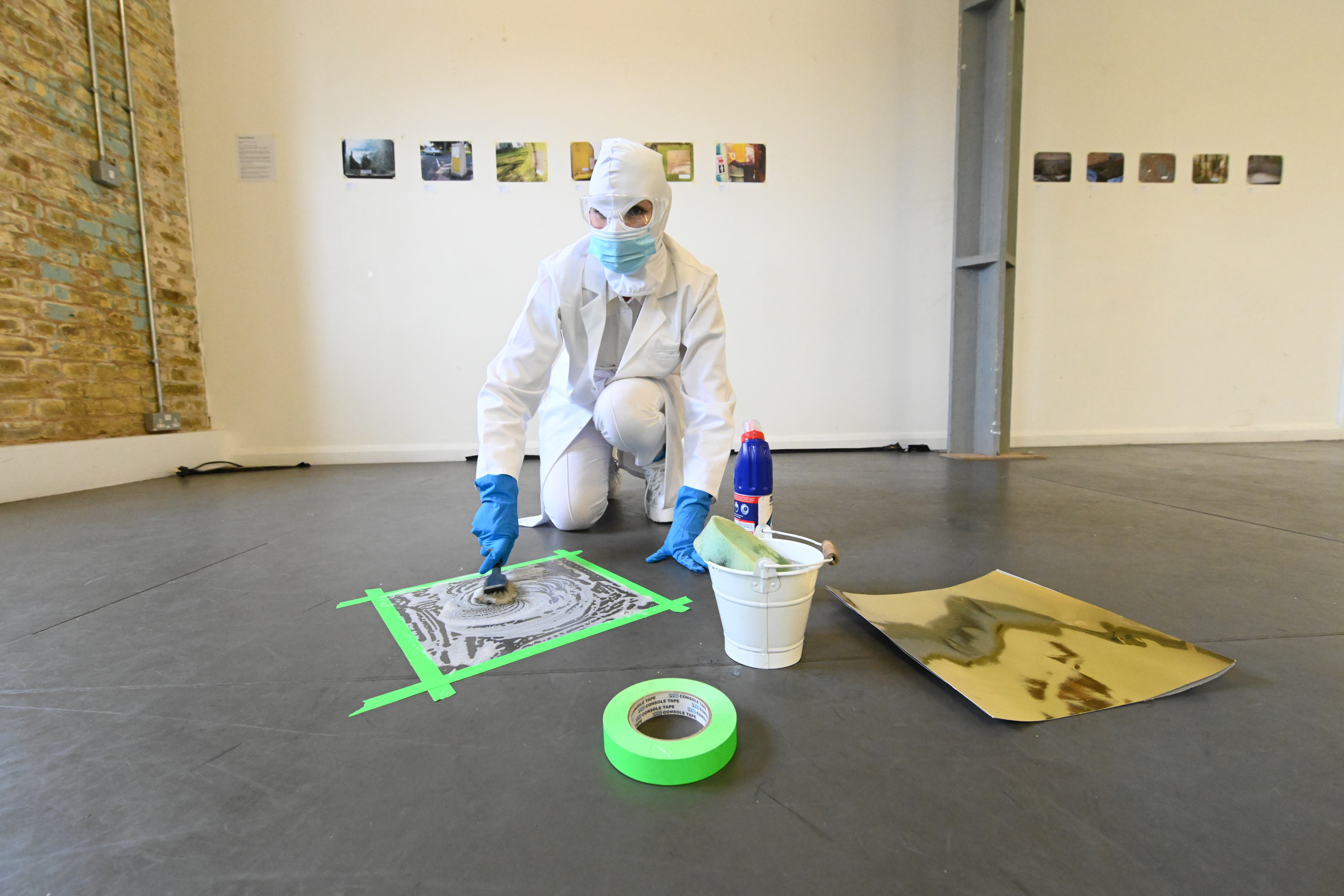
- Amy Jackson performs 'Cleaning Squares' in Solo Exhibition #irl🦄, East London
- Born: Jacqueline Amy Jackson; 1986 (age 39–40); Leeds, United Kingdom
- Education: The Ruskin School of Drawing and Fine Art, University of Oxford
- Known for: Fine Art, Conceptual Art, Street Art, Performance, Installation
- Notable work: Cleaning Squares, The Alternative Art Trail, House
- Movement: Conceptual Art, The Ruskin School of Art
- Website: www.thisisamyjackson.com

Jacqueline Amy Jackson (born 1986) is a British artist who lives and works in East London. She graduated in 2008 from the Ruskin School of Drawing and Fine Art, University of Oxford, England and later returned to study Sustainable Finance at Smith School of Enterprise and the Environment, University of Oxford.

== Biography ==
Jackson is a conceptual artist and curator who explores issues such as climate change, consumerism, mental health, social inequalities and how these themes are inextricably linked. She describes her practice as conceptual due to the fact the idea bears more significance than the medium, it includes street art, happenings, drawing, photography, painting and found objects. Alongside her contribution to contemporary art and curation, she is known for her work in responsible investment.

== Early life ==
Jackson was born in Leeds in 1986 to Alexander G. Jackson, a Jewish father from Leeds, and Jacqueline Jackson, a Christian mother from Doncaster. She attended Leeds Girls’ High School until the age of 18 where she learned drama, piano, clarinet, trombone and saxophone and achieved the PFA Prize for Art and Helena Langhorne Powell Scholarship. She then read Fine Art at the Ruskin School of Art, University of Oxford where she was one of only three students to achieve a first-class degree in 2008.

== Big Brother ==
In 2008, Amy Jackson entered Big Brother: Celebrity Hijack, a special series of the reality TV show Celebrity Big Brother. It was broadcast on E4 from 3–28 January 2008. The premise of the series saw one celebrity a day taking control, with the help of Big Brother; organising their own tasks, making their own rules and talking to the housemates in the Diary Room. They were in charge of a set of housemates who all had a specific talent or profession.

As the Conceptual Artist, Jackson did a live performance piece called Clean on Day 4 and later integrated her experience in the Big Brother House into her artwork with works such as House. During the Andy McNab task, both Jackson and Ogogo were taken away and interrogated. They were given a code and whoever didn't tell the code to McNab won a £5,000 prize and immunity to that week’s eviction. Jackson won the task and along with Ogogo was favourite to win the series, but she finished third place on the final day, Day 26.

== Early career ==
Jackson began her career briefly as a full time artist and later worked as an Art Director in Creative Advertising following a marketing stunt on eBay where she auctioned her talents to the highest bidder. Growing concerned with the ethics of the industry, she left the industry and set up a website for artists and designers who upcycle called Lost, Found and Loved Again Ltd. In 2014 Trucost Plc. appointed Amy Jackson to provide sustainability consultancy services for its growing number of fashion clients following the launch of the world's first Environmental Profit and Loss Account for PUMA. Jackson then specialised in sustainability for a number of years, using her birth name Jacqueline Jackson.

== Sustainable finance ==
Jackson became a spokesperson for sustainability and responsible investment, where she contributed to a number of studies, thought pieces and presentations throughout her time at Trucost and later S&P Global. She is the Head of Responsible Investment at London LGPS CIV, which manages £48 billion on behalf of client funds. Whilst there she has set the most ambitious target on record for any local authority pension scheme towards net zero carbon emissions. She won Rising Star in the 2021 LAPF Investment Awards hosted by Sally Phillips and contributed to the Asset Owner Diversity Charter which seeks to improve diversity within the investment industry.

== Published works ==
- London CIV. Stewardship Outcomes Report 2021
- Natural Capital Protocol. Apparel Sector Guide, The Natural Capital Coalition
- United Nations Environment Programme. The Coral Reef Economy: The Business Case for Investment in the Protection, Preservation and Enhancement of Coral Reef Health
- S&P Global. The Socioeconomic and Environmental Impact of Large Scale Diamond Mining
- Trucost Plc. Pandora, Material Sourcing Natural Capital Assessment and Net Benefit Analysis

== Fine art ==
Jackson became a spokesperson for sustainability and responsible investment in the asset owner space. Following a twelve year gap in her Fine Art practice, her later work responds to issues around environment and socioeconomic inequality where she makes art through activism. Her work often sits outside of the gallery and inside the communities it impacts. Examples include commissions for Kensington + Chelsea Art Week and happenings at The Tate Britain. She has won the Kevin Slingsby Prize for Funnel Vision, The Oxford University Press Pirye Prize and was nominated for The Creative Green Awards as well as The YICCA Contest in 2020.

== Exhibitions (selected) ==
2022

- HRH Princess Margaret Exhibition, 20 Years 20 Artworks, Ken Griffiths Bureau, Soho, London, UK

2021

- Cleaning Squares, CICA Museum, Gyeonggi-do, South Korea
- The Alternative Art Trail, Kensington + Chelsea Art Week, Chelsea, London, UK
- Distanced Domestic, Co.Curation, MKII, Hackney, London, UK
- YICCA 20/21 International Contest of Contemporary Art, Milan, Italy
- Future Now, CooltXchange, London, UK, Sofia, Bulgaria, Belgrade, Serbia

2020

- #irl🦄, The Boathouse Studios, Barking, London, UK
- Little Voices, Kensington + Chelsea Art Week, Chelsea Telephone Exchange, London UK
- Emergent Vision, Uncovered Collective, Peckham, London, UK

2008

- Value, Abbazia di Farfa, Rome, Italy
- Clean, Big Brother House, Hertfordshire, UK
- PACK, The Ruskin School of Art, Oxford, UK

2007

- History, The Oxford University Press, Oxford, UK
- August, The Dolphin Gallery, Oxford, UK
- Box Ladder, Modern Art Oxford, Oxford, UK

== Awards ==
- 2025 Blunden Prize
- 2021 YICCA International Contemporary Art Price (selected artist)
- 2021 LAPF Investment Awards Rising Star (winner)
- 2020 The Creative Green Awards (shortlisted)
- 2006 Kevin Slingsby Prize for Funnel Vision (winner)
- 2006 Geoffrey Rhoades Prize (winner)

== Interviews and reviews ==
- 2022, Demystifying Crypto: Shedding light on the adoption of digital currencies for payments in 2022
- 2022, ESG Investor: New UK Rules Bring LGPS into Line on Climate
- 2021, Episode 128, Ministry of Arts Podcast (interview)
- 2021, Asset.tv, What part can professional investors play on the path to Net Zero?
- 2021, Portfolio Institutional, Responsible Investing (roundtable)
- 2020, Banking on a Sustainable Future, Breaking Banks Fintech (interview)
- 2020, Episode 41, Gaza Guy Podcast (interview)
- 2014, The Colour This Season is Green, China Water Risk (review)

== Charity work ==
Jackson is currently Trustee for the charity Wave of Peace and set up Everything But The Ham in 2017, a Palestinian food pop-up supper club aimed to raise awareness and funds for critical issues and global environmental and social inequalities.

== Personal life ==
In 2017 Jackson married Mohammed Qeshta (b. 1980), with whom she lives in East London, UK. Qeshta was originally a resident of Rafah and coordinator for the International Solidarity Movement in Gaza. He later moved to the United Kingdom following the death of Guardian journalist Tom Hurndall. Qeshta lived in Islington in exile for many years until gaining British citizenship on the 7th of July 2012. The couple worked together on charitable project Everything But The Ham, an immersive dining experience which gained popularity amongst both the supper club and halal dining community
