= 3D – Determination, Dedication, Desire =

3D - Determination, Dedication, Desire

Studio album by Starboy Nathan
- Released: 13 April 2012
- Recorded: 2010–2012
- Genre: R&B; electropop
- Label: Mona Publishing, Vibes Corner Music

Starboy Nathan chronology
Masterpiece (2006)	3D - Determination, Dedication, Desire (2012)

Singles from 3D - Determination, Dedication, Desire
- 1. "Caught Me Slippin" Released: 5 July 2010; 2. "Diamonds" Released: 18 April 2011; 3. "Hangover" Released: 12 September 2011; 4. "Cosmic Kiss" Released: 26 March 2012; 5. "Who Am I" Released: 29 April 2012

3D – Determination, Dedication, Desire is the second studio album by Starboy Nathan.

== Track listing ==
No.	Title	Length
1.	"Who Am I"	3:28
2.	"Hangover" (featuring Wretch 32)	4:01
3.	"Super Woman"	4:05
4.	"Diamonds"	4:10
5.	"See You Again"	4:25
6.	"Streets of Gold"	3:29
7.	"Rescue"	3:37
8.	"Star"	3:43
9.	"Caught Me Slippin" (featuring Flo Rida)	3:30
10.	"Cosmic Kiss"	3:37
11.	"London"	4:11
12.	"Party People"	4:08
13.	"Stone Cold"	3:33

== Chart performance ==
Chart (2012)	Peak position
UK Albums Chart	92

== Release history ==
Country	Release date	Format
United Kingdom	13 May 2012	CD, Digital download
