= Hangover (Starboy Nathan song) =

Single by Starboy Nathan featuring Wretch 32

from the album 3D - Determination, Dedication, Desire
- Released: 16 September 2011
- Recorded: 2010
- Genre: R&B, hip hop
- Length: 3:23
- Label: Mona Publishing, Vibes Corner Music
- Songwriters: Starboy Nathan, Clayton Morrison, Jermaine Scott, Ali Tennant

Starboy Nathan singles chronology
"Diamonds" (2011)	"Hangover" (2011)	"Who Am I" (2012)

Wretch 32 singles chronology
"Don't Go" (2011)	"Hangover" (2011)	"Teardrop" (2011)

"Hangover" is the third official single by Starboy Nathan, from his second album 3D - Determination, Dedication, Desire. The single was released on 16 September 2011 on digital download. The song charted at number 92 in the UK Singles Chart and number 29 on the UK R&B Chart. The song features vocals from English rapper and former Grime MC Wretch 32.

== Music video ==
A music video to accompany the release of "Hangover" was first released onto YouTube on 27 June 2011, at a total length of four minutes and twenty-nine seconds.

== Track listings ==
Digital download

1. "Hangover" (Radio Edit) [feat. Wretch 32] - 3:23
2. "Caught Me Slippin'" (Flo Rida Mix) - 3:30

Digital EP

1. "Hangover" (Radio Edit) [feat. Wretch 32] - 3:23
2. "Hangover" (Agent X L.A.X. Remix Radio Edit) [feat. Wretch 32] - 3:13
3. "Hangover" (Agent X L.A.X. Remix Extended) [feat. Wretch 32] - 5:18
4. "Hangover" (Sticky Remix) [feat. Wretch 32] - 4:48
5. "Hangover" (Claybeat Morning After Remix) [feat. Wretch 32] - 4:03
6. "Caught Me Slippin'" (Flo Rida Mix) - 3:30

== Chart performance ==
Chart (2011)	Peak position
UK Hip Hop/R&B (Official Charts)	29
UK Singles (Official Charts)	92

== Release history ==
Region	Date	Format	Label
United Kingdom	16 September 2011	Digital Download	Mona Publishing / Vibes Corner Music
