= Starboy Nathan =

English singer

Nathan
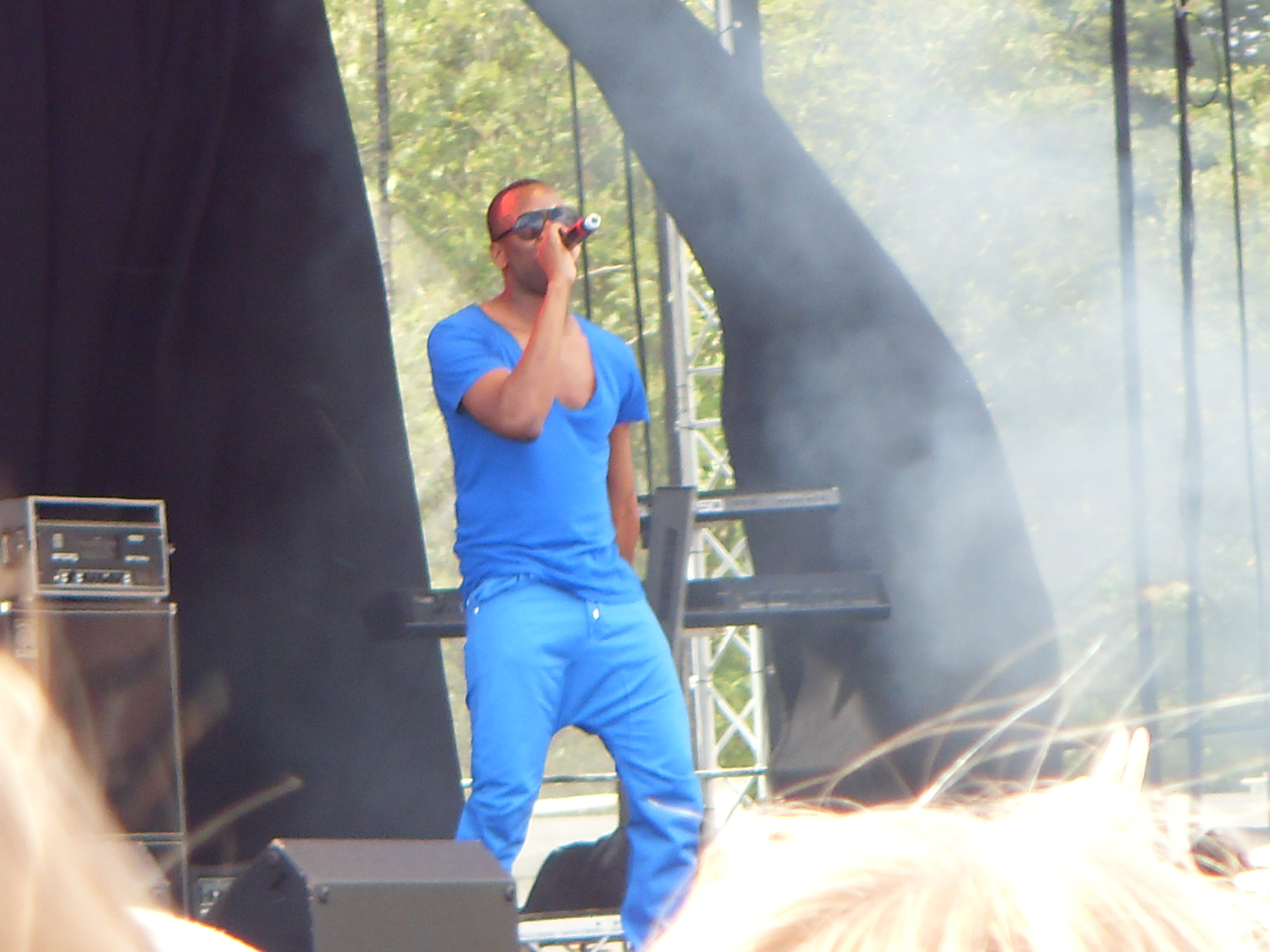
- Nathan performing live in Stoke-on-Trent in 2011

Background information
- Born: Nathan Abraham Lauren Fagan-Gayle; 2 November 1986 (age 39); London, England
- Genres: R&B, pop
- Occupations: Singer, songwriter
- Years active: 2002 –present
- Labels: V2 (2004–2005); Mona Records/Vibes Corner Music /C/C/M/G (2005–present)
- Website: StarboyNathan.com

Nathan Abraham Lauren Fagan-Gayle (born 2 November 1986, South London), known commercially as Nathan and more recently Starboy Nathan, is an English R&B singer, most famous for his Top 40 singles "Come into My Room" and "Diamonds".

== Early life ==
Fagan-Gayle is the son of reggae singer Lorna Gee. Fagan-Gayle and his mother moved to Jamaica when he was two years old so that she could pursue her career. As her profile developed she relocated to the United States while Fagan-Gayle remained in Jamaica with his grandmother. At the age of five he joined his mother in New York City, where they settled until Fagan-Gayle turned 11 years old.

== Career ==
=== 2005–2008: First studio album, Masterpiece ===
In 2005, Fagan-Gayle released his debut single "Come into My Room" which charted inside the UK top 40, peaking at number 37. This was his only single for the label V2 Records. His second single "Round and Round", released in January 2007, marked a change in record label and was the first for Mona Records/Vibes Corner Music. On 9 October 2006, he released his debut album Masterpiece, which was led by the third single "Cold as Ice". Masterpiece debuted and peaked at number 122 on the UK albums chart when it was subsequently reissued in 2007. The fourth single from the album, "Do Without My Love" was released prior to this reissue and became the second biggest hit from Masterpiece, peaking at number 44 on the UK Singles Chart.

On 3 January 2008, Fagan-Gayle entered the Big Brother: Celebrity Hijack house. He came sixth in the show.

=== 2009–present: Second studio album, 3D and name change ===
Since the release of Masterpiece and the promotion for it ending in 2008, Fagan-Gayle has been working on his sophomore effort. His second studio album is due for release in November 2011 and is entitled 3D – Determination, Dedication, Desire. The first single from the album was "Caught Me Slippin" featuring Flo Rida, which was issued on 5 July 2010.

In 2011, Fagan-Gayle began using the moniker Starboy Nathan instead of the mononym by which he was originally recognised. He explained the reason for the name change in an interview with Tale Tela, "You know what, you kinda proved my point when you said 'Nathan, just Nathan' and that was the point 'just Nathan' and I just wanted to have a bit more fun with it. It came from when I was young and I used to perform in front of my family and my parents and my Mum just to say "Starboy time", it's just a bit of fun and it's more distinctive. I mean, you can type in Nathan, just Nathan into Google and I might come up or you get 50 million other things whereas 'Starboy Nathan' is very defiant and it's definitive and you can search it and all of my library will come up and stuff so it's a bit more like that. And I've changed the Twitter name to 'Starboy Nathan' and the Facebook name as well. It didn't confuse any fans, I told them, they were with me on it."

Following a support slot on the second JLS tour, And The Ndubz tour Starboy Nathan announced that "Diamonds" would be the second single from the 3D album. The single was released on 18 April 2011. Starboy Nathan will also be supporting The Wanted on their UK tour.

Starboy Nathan's single "Hangover" (featuring Wretch 32) was released on 12 September 2011 and reached position 92 on the UK Singles Chart. His album 3D – Dedication, Determination, Desire was released the following year.

Fagan-Gayle auditioned in 2012 for The X Factor. In auditions he received four yeses to take him through to the Bootcamp round, where he then progressed to the Judges Houses round in Dubai. However, judge Nicole Scherzinger did not select him to be one of her top three male contestants (16 to 24 males).

== Personal life ==
In May 2016, Fagan-Gayle was sentenced at the Old Bailey to 20 months in prison for his part in a telephone scam in 2014–2015 that defrauded a number of British pensioners of a total of £1 million.

== Discography ==
=== Albums ===
Album title	Album details	Peak chart positions
Album title	Album details	UK
Masterpiece	Debut studio album; Released: 9 October 2006; Formats: CD, Digital download	122
3D – Determination, Dedication, Desire	Second studio album; Released: 13 May 2012; Formats: CD, Digital download	92

=== Singles ===
Year	Single	Chart positions	Album
Year	Single	UK	Album
2005	"Come into My Room"	37	Masterpiece
2006	"Round and Round"	—	Masterpiece
2006	"Cold as Ice"	—	Masterpiece
2007	"Do Without My Love"	44	Masterpiece
2010	"Caught Me Slippin" (featuring Flo Rida)	—	3D – Determination, Dedication, Desire
2011	"Diamonds"	23	3D – Determination, Dedication, Desire
2011	"Hangover" (featuring Wretch 32)	92	3D – Determination, Dedication, Desire
2012	"Cosmic Kiss"	—	3D – Determination, Dedication, Desire
2012	"Who Am I"	—	3D – Determination, Dedication, Desire
2013	"Dark Room"	—	Non-album single
