= Who Am I (Starboy Nathan song) =

Single by Starboy Nathan

from the album 3D - Determination, Dedication, Desire
- Released: 29 April 2012
- Recorded: 2011
- Genre: Pop
- Length: 3:28
- Label: Mona Publishing, Vibes Corner Music
- Songwriter(s): Starboy Nathan

Starboy Nathan singles chronology
"Hangover" (2011)	"Who Am I" (2012)

"Who Am I" is the fourth official single by Starboy Nathan, from his second album 3D - Determination, Dedication, Desire. The single was released on 29 April 2012 on digital download. The song charted at number 6 in the UK Indie Chart and number 23 on the UK R&B Chart.

== Music video ==
A music video to accompany the release of "Who Am I" was first released onto YouTube on 13 April 2012, at a total length of three minutes and thirty-eight seconds.

== Track listings ==
Digital download
No.	Title	Length
1.	"Who Am I" (Radio Edit)	3:28
2.	"Cosmic Kiss" (Radio Edit)	3:37
3.	"London"	4:11
4.	"Who Am I" (Acapella)	3:26

== Chart performance ==
Chart (2012)	Peak position
UK Indie (OCC)	6
UK Hip Hop/R&B (OCC)	23

== Release history ==
Region	Date	Format	Label
United Kingdom	29 April 2012	Digital Download	Mona Publishing / Vibes Corner Music
