= Diamonds (Starboy Nathan song) =

Single by Starboy Nathan

from the album 3D – Determination, Dedication, Desire
- Released: 17 April 2011
- Length: 3:38
- Label: Mona Publishing, Vibes Corner Music
- Songwriter(s): Starboy Nathan, Obi Fred Ebele, Uche Ben Ebele

Starboy Nathan singles chronology
"Caught Me Slippin" (2010)	"Diamonds" (2011)	"Hangover" (2011)

"Diamonds" is a single by Starboy Nathan, taken from his second album 3D – Determination, Dedication, Desire. The single was released on 17 April 2011 on digital download and CD single. The song charted at number 23 in the UK Singles Chart. The song has over 1.7 million views on YouTube.

== Track listings ==
Digital download, CD single

1. "Diamonds" (Radio Edit) – 3:33

Digital EP

1. "Diamonds" (Radio Edit) – 3;33
2. "Diamonds" (Wideboys Radio Mix) – 3:27
3. "Diamonds" (Wideboys Club Mix) – 6:16
4. "Diamonds" (Wideboys Dub) – 6:16

== Chart performance ==
Chart (2011)	Peak position
UK Singles (OCC)	23

== Release history ==
Region	Date	Format	Label
United Kingdom	17 April 2011	Digital download, CD single	Mona Publishing, Vibes Corner Music
