= Come into My Room =

Single by Nathan

from the album Masterpiece
- Released: 28 February 2005
- Recorded: 2004
- Genre: R&B
- Length: 3:43 (radio edit); 4:05 (album version)
- Label: V2
- Songwriter(s): N. Fagan-Gayle, Pete Kirtley, W. Lawes, Richardo Small
- Producer(s): Wayne Lawes, Rickardo Reid

Nathan singles chronology
"Come into My Room" (2005)	"Round and Round" (2005)

"Come into My Room" is the debut single from British R&B singer Nathan and the first single taken from his debut album Masterpiece. The single was released on 28 February 2005 and reached #37 on the UK Singles Chart.

== Music video ==
A music video to accompany the release of "Come into My Room" was first released onto YouTube on 5 March 2005 at a total length of three minutes and forty-eight seconds.

== Track listing ==
1. "Come into My Room" (Radio Edit)
2. "Come into My Room" (Jaimeson UKG Remix)
3. "Come into My Room" (Skylone remix)
4. "Come into My Room" (Vybz Kartel remix)
5. "Come into My Room" (A cappella)
6. "Come into My Room" (Music Video)

== Chart performance ==
Chart (2005)	Peak position
UK Singles (OCC)	37

== Release history ==
Region	Date	Format	Label
United Kingdom	28 February 2005	CD	V2 Records
