= Celebrity Big Brother (British TV series) series 5 =

Coordinates: 51°39′23″N 0°16′02″W

Celebrity Big Brother
- Series 5
- Series five logo
- Presented by: Davina McCall
- No. of days: 26
- No. of housemates: 14
- Winner: Shilpa Shetty
- Runner-up: Jermaine Jackson
- Companion shows: Big Brother's Little Brother; Big Brother's Big Mouth; Big Brother's Big Brain; Big Brother Live; Diary Room Uncut
- No. of episodes: 30

Release
- Original network: Channel 4
- Original release: 3 January – 28 January 2007

Series chronology
- ← Previous; Series 4 Next → Series 6

Celebrity Big Brother 2007, also known as Celebrity Big Brother 5, is the fifth series of the British reality television series Celebrity Big Brother. The show followed a total of fourteen celebrity contestants, known as housemates, who were isolated from the outside world for an extended period of time in a custom-built house. Each week, one or more of the housemates were eliminated from the competition by public vote and left the house. The last remaining housemate, Shilpa Shetty, was declared the winner.

The series launched on Channel 4 on 3 January 2007 and ended on 28 January 2007. Davina McCall returned as presenter, having presented both the regular edition and the celebrity edition of Big Brother since they first began. Eleven housemates entered on launch night, with an additional three being introduced two days later. The series was watched by an average of 4.6 million viewers, the third highest viewed series of the show to date. As with the previous regular series, it was broadcast in 16:9 aspect ratio, as opposed to 4:3 – the first series of Celebrity Big Brother to do so.

The series saw the return of Jade Goody, who had become a media celebrity after appearing on the third regular series of Big Brother in 2002, arriving with her boyfriend and her mother – marking the first time in any series of Big Brother UK where family members entered together. During its original broadcast, Celebrity Big Brother 5 became the subject of an internationally publicised racism controversy. It attracted the largest number of complaints to the UK media regulator Ofcom about a Big Brother series and, as of 2021, the third highest number of complaints about any British television broadcast of all time (after Jerry Springer: The Opera and the BBC's coverage of the death of Prince Philip). Viewer complaints and press attention concerned housemate Shilpa Shetty, and alleged that she was the subject of racist bullying from some of her fellow housemates, in particular Jade Goody, Danielle Lloyd, and Jo O'Meara. As a result, a protest took place in India; tensions increased between the UK and Indian governments; and a diplomatic incident occurred. Following the broadcast of the series, Ofcom concluded that Celebrity Big Brother 5 had breached the Broadcasting Code, and statutory sanctions were placed on Channel 4.

== Format ==
Celebrity Big Brother is a game show in which a group of celebrity contestants, referred to as housemates, live in isolation from the outside world in a custom built "house", constantly under video surveillance. During their time in the House, the housemates are required to nominate two of their fellow contestants for potential eviction, and the two or more with the most votes would be nominated. This process is mandatory for all housemates, and failure to comply could result in expulsion from the House. The public then vote, with one of those celebrities evicted from the house. When the final week arrives, the viewers vote for which of the remaining celebrities should win the series, and the housemate with the most votes becomes the winner.

During their time in the House, housemates are given weekly tasks to perform. The housemates wager a portion of their weekly shopping budget on the task, and either win double their wagered fund or lose the wagered fund depending on their performance in the task. The housemates are required to work as a group to complete their tasks, with the format of the tasks varying based on the number of remaining housemates. Throughout the series, some housemates have been given secret tasks that must either be completed individually or with a small group; failure to do so can result in the housemate being nominated or punished in the House. Should the housemates run out of the food provided for them, an emergency ration was available to them. The housemates are forbidden from discussing nominations, and doing so could result in punishment. The format of the series is mainly seen as a social experiment, and requires housemates to interact with others who may have differing ideals, beliefs, and prejudices. Housemates are also required to make visits to the Diary Room during their stay in the House, where they are able to share their thoughts and feelings on their fellow housemates and the game.

== Housemates ==
Eleven housemates entered the house on Day 1, followed by three more housemates on Day 3. This was more than any other celebrity series at the time.

Celebrity	Age on entry	Notability	Day entered	Day exited	Result
Shilpa Shetty	31	Bollywood actress	1	26	Winner
Jermaine Jackson	52	Jackson family member and singer	1	26	Runner-up
Dirk Benedict	61	Actor	1	26	3rd place
Ian Watkins	30	Singer	1	26	4th place
Danielle Lloyd	23	Glamour model and Miss Great Britain	1	26	5th place
Jack Tweed	19	Boyfriend of Jade Goody	3	26	6th place
Cleo Rocos	44	Actress	1	24	Evicted
Jo O'Meara	27	Singer	1	24	Evicted
Jade Goody	25	Reality TV star	3	17	Evicted
Carole Malone	52	Journalist and broadcaster	1	10	Evicted
Leo Sayer	58	Singer	1	10	Walked
Jackiey Budden	49	Mother of Jade Goody	3	8	Evicted
Ken Russell	79	Director	1	5	Walked
Donny Tourette	25	Singer	1	3	Walked

=== Carole Malone ===
Carole Malone is an English journalist and television presenter, who writes a column for the Sunday Mirror newspaper. She also presented the Sky One programme Guilty! from 1997 to 1999 and appeared as a regular panellist on The Wright Stuff. She entered the house on Day 1 and became the second housemate to be evicted on Day 10.

=== Cleo Rocos ===
Cleo Rocos is a Brazil-born actress, who co-starred alongside comedian Kenny Everett in The Kenny Everett Television Show. She entered the house on Day 1. She became the fifth housemate to be evicted on Day 24.

=== Danielle Lloyd ===
Danielle Lloyd is an English glamour model, who had her Miss Great Britain title revoked after appearing in the December 2006 edition of Playboy magazine. At the time of her appearance on the show Lloyd was dating English footballer Teddy Sheringham, she entered the house on Day 1. During her time in the house, Lloyd was accused of alleged racist behaviour towards her fellow housemate Shilpa. She finished in fifth place on Day 26.

=== Dirk Benedict ===
Dirk Benedict is an American actor, most notable for his television roles as Lieutenant Starbuck in Battlestar Galactica and Lieutenant Templeton "Face" Peck in The A-Team. He entered the house on Day 1. He finished in third place on Day 26.

=== Donny Tourette ===
Donny Tourette is an English singer-songwriter, best known as a member of the punk rock band Towers of London. He entered the house on Day 1. He walked from the series on Day 3.

=== Ian "H" Watkins ===
Ian "H" Watkins is a Welsh singer and actor, best known as a member of the pop group Steps. He entered the house on Day 1. He finished in fourth place on Day 26.

=== Jack Tweed ===
Jack Tweed was the then-boyfriend of Jade Goody, who entered the house on Day 3. He finished in sixth place on Day 26. He married Goody in February 2009, just before her death in March 2009. Simple English Wikipedia offers more here

=== Jackiey Budden ===
Jackiey Budden was the mother of Jade Goody. Prior to her appearance on the series, she appeared on an episode of the Living TV show Extreme Makeover UK. She entered the house on Day 3 and became the first housemate to be evicted on Day 8.

=== Jade Goody ===
Jade Goody was an English reality television personality. She first appeared as a housemate on the third series of Big Brother in 2002, before starring in its one-off series Big Brother Panto and her own Sky Living reality shows including Just Jade. She entered the house on Day 3. During her time in the house, Goody was accused of racist behaviour towards her fellow housemate Shilpa. She became the third housemate to be evicted on Day 17. Goody died on 22 March 2009.

=== Jermaine Jackson ===
Jermaine Jackson is an American singer, songwriter and bass guitarist, who achieved international stardom as a member of the family band The Jackson 5. His solo releases "Let's Get Serious" and "Do What You Do" both reached the top 10 of the UK Singles Chart. He entered the house on Day 1. He finished as the runner-up on Day 26.

=== Jo O'Meara ===
Jo O'Meara is an English singer and songwriter, best known as a member of the pop group S Club 7. She entered the house on Day 1. During her time in the house, O'Meara was accused of alleged racist behaviour towards her fellow housemate Shilpa. She became the fourth housemate to be evicted on Day 24.

=== Ken Russell ===
Ken Russell was an English film director, whose credits included films such as Women in Love and Tommy. He entered the house on Day 1. He walked from the series on Day 5. Russell died on 27 November 2011.

=== Leo Sayer ===
Leo Sayer is an English-Australian singer-songwriter and musician, who rose to prominence in the 1970s with releases such as "You Make Me Feel Like Dancing" and "When I Need You". He entered the house on Day 1. He walked from the series on Day 10 after not wanting to wash his undergarments.

=== Shilpa Shetty ===
Shilpa Shetty is an Indian actress, primarily known for her roles in Main Khiladi Tu Anari and Dhadkan. She made her Bollywood debut with the film Baazigar. She was also the judge of dance reality show Jhalak Dikhhla Jaa. She entered the house on Day 1. During her time in the house, Shetty was the subject of alleged racist behaviour from her fellow housemates Danielle, Jade, and Jo. She won the series on Day 26.

== Nominations table ==
	Day 3	Day 9	Day 15	Day 21	Day 26 Final		Nominations received
Shilpa	Master in Task	Jack, Leo	Jade, Jack	Dirk, Jack	Winner (Day 26)		9
Jermaine	Master in Task	Jo, Danielle	Jade, Jo	Danielle, Jo	Runner-up (Day 26)		2
Dirk	Servant in Task	Ian, Jermaine	Jade, Jermaine	Jo, Cleo	Third place (Day 26)		13
Ian	Servant in Task	Leo, Dirk	Danielle, Jade	Cleo, Jo	Fourth place (Day 26)		3
Danielle	Servant in Task	Leo, Dirk	Shilpa, Dirk	Dirk, Ian	Fifth place (Day 26)		3
Jack	Master in Task	Shilpa, Dirk	Shilpa, Dirk	Dirk, Shilpa	Sixth place (Day 26)		5
Cleo	Servant in Task	Banned	Shilpa, Jade	Dirk, Ian	Evicted (Day 24)		2
Jo	Servant in Task	Leo, Jack	Shilpa, Dirk	Dirk, Shilpa	Evicted (Day 24)		6
Jade	Master in Task	Shilpa, Dirk	Shilpa, Dirk	Evicted (Day 17)			5
Carole	Servant in Task	Banned	Evicted (Day 10)				N/A
Leo	Servant in Task	Jack, Jo	Walked (Day 10)				4
Jackiey	Master in Task	Evicted (Day 8)					N/A
Ken	Master in Task	Walked (Day 5)					N/A
Donny	Servant in Task	Walked (Day 3)					N/A
Notes	1	2	3	4	5		
Against public vote	Jack, Jackiey, Jade, Jermaine, ~~Ken~~, Shilpa	Carole, Dirk, ~~Leo~~	Jade, Shilpa	Cleo, Dirk, Ian, Jo, Shilpa	Danielle, Dirk, Ian, Jack, Jermaine, Shilpa		
Walked	Donny, Ken	Leo	none				
Evicted	Jackiey; 4.6% to save	Carole; 77.4% to evict	Jade; 82% to evict	Jo; 48.4% to evict	Jack; 3.15% (out of 6)	Dirk; 16% (out of 3)	
Evicted	Jackiey; 4.6% to save	Carole; 77.4% to evict	Jade; 82% to evict	Jo; 48.4% to evict	Danielle; 3.30% (out of 6)	Dirk; 16% (out of 3)	
Evicted	Jackiey; 4.6% to save	Carole; 77.4% to evict	Jade; 82% to evict	Jo; 48.4% to evict	Danielle; 3.30% (out of 6)	Jermaine; 37% (out of 2)	
Evicted	Jackiey; 4.6% to save	Carole; 77.4% to evict	Jade; 82% to evict	Cleo; 27.9% to evict	Ian; 5.3% (out of 4)	Jermaine; 37% (out of 2)	
Evicted	Jackiey; 4.6% to save	Carole; 77.4% to evict	Jade; 82% to evict	Cleo; 27.9% to evict	Shilpa; 63% to win		

Notes

- ^Note 1: When Jade, Jack, and Jackiey entered the house they became "masters" along with Jermaine, Ken, and Shilpa. The other eight housemates were chosen to be their "servants" and moved to the House Next Door. It was revealed that the masters are automatically nominated for eviction in which the viewers are to vote which housemates to save, rather than evicted. Therefore, the housemate with the fewest votes is evicted. Donny, who was originally a servant, left the house on Day 3. On Day 5, Ken voluntarily left after being involved in arguments with housemates. The eviction was not cancelled, and Ken's number was removed from the voting system.
- ^Note 2: Carole and Cleo were banned from nominating as a punishment for discussing nominations earlier. Additionally, housemates had to choose one of them to face the public vote. They chose Carole. On Day 10, Leo escaped the house. The eviction was not cancelled, and Leo's number was removed from the voting system. At the time of his exit, Leo had the most votes to evict.
- ^Note 3: The nominations were cast on Day 15 and announced on Day 16. The voting package was delayed and only shown at the end of Big Brother's Big Mouth where it was also revealed that all Channel 4's profits for this vote will go to charity.
- ^Note 4: There was a double eviction on Day 24 and therefore the three or more housemates were placed up for the public vote rather than the two or more housemates. If there was not a double eviction, Dirk and Jo would have faced the public vote. The voting lines originally opened on Day 22 but were reset on Day 23 due to an error which stated that viewers were to vote to save Shilpa when they were in fact voting to evict. Viewers who had voted before the lines were reset were offered a full refund with all unclaimed money and profits from the vote being donated to charity
- ^Note 5: There were no nominations in the final two days and instead the public were voting for the housemate they wanted to win rather than evict. There was a double eviction on Day 24, two days before the final.

== Summary ==
Day 1	Entrances	Jermaine, Danielle, Ken, Jo, Leo, Shilpa, Carole, Donny, H, Cleo and Dirk entered the house.
Day 3	Entrances	Jack, Jackiey, and Jade entered the house.
Day 3	Tasks	The housemates were told to pack a small suitcase each that must last them three days and three nights. Big Brother announced that eight of the current housemates were to move to the House Next Door while the remaining three housemates were to stay in the main house. Danielle, Jo, Leo, Carole, Donny, H, Cleo and Dirk moved into the house next door and will become servants to the masters in the main house: Jermaine, Shilpa and Ken who were joined by Jade, her boyfriend Jack and her mother Jackiey.
Day 3	Exits	Donny walked from the house as he did not want to wait on Jade hand and foot.
Day 5	Exits	Ken walked from the house.
Day 6	Tasks	The housemates were informed that they had passed the Masters and Servants task. Jo failed because she allowed Ken to make his own food at one point and Leo failed because he fell asleep during his shift.
Day 8	Exits	Jackiey was evicted from the house, receiving 4.6% of the public vote to save. Jackiey was called to the Diary Room and informed she would leave the house via the diary room and would not say goodbye to her fellow housemates; the housemates observed Jackiey's eviction on the plasma screen in the kitchen.
Day 9	Punishments	Carole faced the vote automatically after it was revealed that Cleo and she had discussed nominations, the housemates were instructed to choose one of the pair to face the public vote.
Day 9	Nominations	The housemates nominated for the first time. Dirk and Leo received the most nominations and faced the public vote. They were joined by Carole as punishment for discussing nominations.
Day 10	Exits	Leo walked from the house.; Carole was evicted from the house, receiving 77% of the public vote to evict.
Day 11	Tasks	Jermaine and Ian were tasked to take each other on in a Battle of the Tribute Bands: Steps vs The Jackson 5. They were chosen to be band leaders. Ian chose Jo, Jade and Jack while Jermaine chose Shilpa, Cleo, Dirk and Danielle to be their band members. They must sing and dance to the songs selected by Big Brother, Steps performed Deeper Shade of Blue and The Jackson 5 performed I Want You Back. The winner was decided by an online poll on the Big Brother website. The Jackson 5 won by 75% of the votes and were awarded platinum discs. All housemates were rewarded a Jackson 5 themed party.
Day 13	Tasks	Housemates were required to complete an assault course in under nine minutes. The housemates failed this task and received a basic shopping budget.
Day 14	General	Shilpa and Jade were involved in an argument with each other which began with a disagreement over an Oxo cube. The argument increased the growing controversy surrounding the racist bullying of Shilpa.
Day 15	Tasks	Housemates were set a task to divide into groups and create abstract art to express their emotions. They passed the task and received champagne as a reward.
Day 15	Nominations	Housemates nominated for the second time. Jade and Shilpa received the most nominations and faced the public vote.
Day 17	Tasks	Housemates were instructed to use their voices to perform William Tell Overture, which they passed.
Day 17	Exits	Jade was the third person to be evicted from the house after receiving 82% of the public vote to evict. Due to the controversy at the time, her eviction was not attended by a live audience.
Day 19	Tasks	Housemates were given a task where they were required to make Big Brother laugh. They passed the task and received party food as a reward.
Day 20	Tasks	The task was to perform a showgirl dance routine. Housemates passed the task and received a luxury shopping budget.
Day 21	Tasks	The housemates had to choose something they wanted under £10. They had to answer questions about their fellow housemates. Each housemate had to choose another housemate and answer questions about the housemate. If a housemate got 3 out of 5 questions right, the housemate that the other housemate chose would have won their prize they selected before the task.
Day 21	Nominations	The housemates nominated for the third and final time. Cleo, Dirk, Ian, Jo and Shilpa received the most nominations and faced the public vote.
Day 22	Tasks	The housemates were each given a large ice cube with a token inside. Using only their mouth and tongue, they had to melt the ice cube enough for them to be able to retrieve the token with their hands. If all 8 housemates retrieved their token within 90 minutes, they would win an après-ski party. Housemates passed the task.
Day 24	Exits	Jo and Cleo were evicted from the house receiving 48.4% and 27.9% of the public vote, respectively, to evict.
Day 25	Tasks	The housemates were instructed to devise four performances each based around a different genre: romantic comedy, film noir, action blockbuster and Bollywood musical. All past and present housemates must be portrayed by the final six housemates. The housemates passed the task and therefore earned a three course sit down meal.
Day 26	Exits	Jack left the house in sixth place, Danielle left the house in fifth place, Ian left the house in fourth place and Dirk left the house in third place. It was revealed that Shilpa was the winner, leaving Jermaine as the runner-up.

== Production ==
=== Eye logo ===
The eye logo for this series was the same yellow and black spiraled eye used for Big Brother 7. Two modifications were a black background, therefore camouflaging the black spiral in the eye, and making only the yellow spiral visible. A star also replaced the pupil to correspond with the celebrity series. The star also shone with a yellow glow.

=== Sponsorship ===
The Carphone Warehouse remained as sponsor of the series, however due to highly publicised controversy which surrounded the series, Carphone Warehouse subsequently ended their long running association with Big Brother.

=== Broadcasts ===
Davina McCall presented the main Channel 4 show, including the live launch, evictions, finale and any other live show where a twist would take place. Marcus Bentley narrated the nightly highlight shows.

Dermot O'Leary presented Celebrity Big Brother's Little Brother in a teatime slot weekdays and on Sunday lunchtime. He also presented Celebrity Big Brother's Big Brain, which was introduced during the previous non-celebrity series; it would not return for any subsequent series.

On E4, live coverage from the house once again dominated its daily and nightly schedule, E4 Music was once again rested during the series. Diary Room Uncut returned on Monday evenings and on Saturday night, straight after the Channel 4 show.

Russell Brand presented Celebrity Big Brother's Big Mouth, which was broadcast Sunday to Friday straight after the Channel 4 show. Although no announcement was made during the series, Brand announced his departure on 4 April 2007.

Live streaming also returned on the Official Channel 4 website and also on E4 at selected times.

=== House ===
House plan with the House Next Door highlighted.

The general layout of the house was largely untouched from the previous non-celebrity series. The living room and bedroom had no noticeable changes. There were several single beds in the same room, with one double bed, meaning that two housemates (Leo and Donny) had to share. The bathroom was much smaller than previous versions and the toilet and shower were no longer fitted with cameras. The dining room table was moved inside, and the kitchen fully equipped with modern conveniences. Outside the garden was a three-jet hot tub with a farmyard seating area. The bridge to Nowhere was still present, leading to a sitting area with heated seats and the topiary man. A workout area was situated just off the kitchen area. Inside the house there was also a fax machine built into the wall. On day 24 this was used to post viewers' questions to the housemates. Meanwhile, the Diary Room was identical to the previous summer's Big Brother, with an oversized gold chair and padded walls, the only change being the addition of yellow lights facing the walls.

==== House Next Door ====
The House Next Door was used again, and its interior was re-designed to resemble a Victorian-style kitchen, with uncomfortable beds in the bedroom, for use in the master-and-servant task.

=== Voting fault ===
One event in this series was a technical fault that affected voting lines in the eviction between Cleo Rocos, Dirk Benedict, Ian Watkins, Jo O'Meara and Shilpa Shetty. Everyone who voted was offered a refund. Any unclaimed money would be donated to charity.

== Viewership ==
All viewing figures below are provided by the Broadcasters Audience Research Board (or "BARB").

	Official viewers (millions)				
	Week 1		Week 2	Week 3	Week 4
Saturday		3.16	2.93	3.3	2.56
Sunday		3.39	3.03	3.65	6.01
Monday		3.81	3.75	4.16	
Tuesday		4.1	4.72	4.32	
Wednesday	7.32	4.51	5.4	4.71	
Thursday	5.48	3.72	5.89	4.47	
Friday	4.25	3.5	7.61	5.14	
Friday	5.27	3.8	8.78	5.26	
Weekly average	4.36		5.26	4.36	4.29
Running average	4.36		4.72	4.62	4.29
Series average	4.6				
blue-coloured boxes denote live shows.

== Racism controversy ==
Celebrity Big Brother criticism focused around the treatment of housemate Shilpa Shetty by contestants Jade Goody, Jo O'Meara and Danielle Lloyd. British media regulator Ofcom received more than 44,500 complaints – a record number for a British television programme after transmission. Channel 4 received an additional 3,000 complaints, about racism and bullying by housemates against Shetty. The Eastern Eye newspaper launched an online petition that registered over 30,000 signatures. Channel 4, who had initially described the situation as "girly rivalry", later admitted there had "undoubtedly been a cultural clash between her and three of the British females in the house".

After an investigation by Ofcom, they concluded that Channel 4 had breached the Broadcasting Code on three occasions.
