= Experiential dining =

Non-traditional dining settings

Experiential dining is a modern form of dining that offers customers a unique experience that expands beyond a "traditional" dining experience. A unique experience provided by a restaurant or food truck may include dining in darkness, in a large space, in high places, or in outdoor settings. The experiential dining trend is primarily driven by Millennial and Generation Z diners.

== Examples of Experiential ==
=== BLACKOUT Dining in the Dark ===
Blackout Dining in the Dark is a pitch black dining experience in Las Vegas, NV where customers use heightened senses to experience a pre-fixed, seven course meal. Customers are required to leave all light emitting devices in a locker prior to entering the dining area. The staff wear night vision goggles and guide guests to their table where they ask them if they have any allergies. Each course has been carefully crafted to entice the taste buds offering customers a unique sensation. Upon completion of the meal the staff shares details of each course with the guests.

=== Dick's Last Resort ===
Dick's Last Resort is a bar and restaurant chain where restaurant staff intentionally are obnoxious and rude to customers. Patrons of Dick's are expected to be insulted, or placed in uncomfortable situations. Adult bibs and large, hand-made, paper hats are given to diners to wear during their stay. There are no napkins on the tables; they are generally thrown at the customers by the serving staff.

=== Prison Feng Yin ===
Prison Feng Yin is a converted prison where customers are shackled in a cell and enjoy their meal amongst other inmates.
