= Cleo Rocos =

English comedy actress, producer, presenter and businesswoman (born 1962)

- Born: 24 July 1962 (age 64); Rio de Janeiro, Brazil
- Occupations: Comedy actress; producer; presenter; businesswoman
- Years active: 1981–present
- Television: The Kenny Everett Television Show

Cleo Rocos (born 24 July 1962) is a UK-based comedy actress, producer, presenter and businesswoman who starred alongside Kenny Everett on The Kenny Everett Television Show.

== Early life ==
Rocos was born in Brazil. Her father was Greek and worked in shipping, and her mother was English. She came to England as a child to attend school, and also took acting classes.

== Television career ==
=== Early career and Kenny Everett ===
Rocos had an early non-speaking part as a green-skinned alien in the first episode of the Hitchhiker's Guide to the Galaxy television series (1981), demonstrating the effects of a Pan-Galactic Gargle Blaster. According to Rocos she was later lunching at the BBC with The Hitchhiker's... director Alan Bell when they were approached by Jim Moir, later Head of Light Entertainment, who asked her to audition for a new show he was developing. This was Kenny Everett's BBC series The Kenny Everett Television Show, which would run for five series from 1981 to 1988, in which her glamorous curvaceous figure was often used to comic effect. The role would also be echoed in her similar appearances in the 1985 TV sketch series Assaulted Nuts, and later in reports for the consumer affairs show That's Life!. Rocos went on to remark in 2013 that the show would not be made in modern times on account of "professional campaigning women with thick ankles and shrill ovaries who have nothing better to do than to police people’s opinions". She also appeared, playing a white-coated lab assistant, alongside Everett in BBC1 science quiz series Brainstorm, which ran for one series in 1988.

Off-screen the two found an immediate affinity, which became an enduring friendship "causing mischief wherever we went". Marcus Berkmann described the pair as "two reticent, rather formal people who loved to play and perform but valued their privacy above all else."

=== Later work ===
From the late 1980s to early 1990s, Rocos starred in a Welsh comedy show on S4C called Pobol y Chyff. Rhys Ifans and Meirion Davies played the main characters.

An occasional sidekick to 'shock jock' DJ James Whale on late-night ITV in the early 1990s, she fulfilled a similar role with TV critic Garry Bushell on ITV nocturnal TV-review series Bushell on the Box. She also made a few appearances in the Ugly Bloke slot, as an incongruously glamorous escort to physically unattractive males, on Chris Evans' Channel 4 series TFI Friday in about 1996.

Other TV credits include an acting role in US drama series Highlander, presenting and co-producing a short Channel 5 series on the dresses of Princess Diana (whom she knew personally), participating in BBC game shows such as Wipeout, Blankety Blank and Ready, Steady, Cook, and partaking in Channel 5's karaoke show Night Fever. She also starred in Leigh Francis' TV series Whatever I Want as herself, as did Big Brother host Davina McCall. Rocos later appeared again with Francis, on Bo'! in the US, the US version of Bo' Selecta!.

Although her television work became less frequent after Everett's 1995 death, during the late 1990s she presented quirky reports from exotic locations for the long-running ITV travel show Wish You Were Here...?.

=== 2000s and 2010s ===
In 2002-3 she presented and produced a travel show for Five called Cleo Worldwide, and she spent much of summer 2006 recording a new travel show for television about the wonders of the world.

In 2007, Rocos entered the Celebrity Big Brother house and remained in the house until the final week. She was voted off the show on 26 January 2007 as part of a surprise joint eviction along with singer Jo O'Meara, a former member of pop group S Club 7.

On 30 December 2007, Rocos was interviewed on Sky News as a "friend of Benazir Bhutto", the recently assassinated Pakistan politician.

On 2 January 2010, she appeared on the BBC celebrity special of Total Wipeout and on 2 May 2010, she appeared on the Watch game show, Scream If You Know the Answer. In October 2011, she was a participant in Channel 4 show Come Dine with Me and was joint winner with the pop singer Pete Burns.

In 2013 she appeared on BBC Radio 4's The Museum of Curiosity with Robert Llewellyn and Kevin Warwick.

In 2014 (a few weeks before the World Cup association football tournament in Rio de Janeiro in June), she narrated the three-part observational series, 'Welcome to Rio', which aimed to reveal the truth about the city's famous shanty-towns, the favelas, through the lives of people who live there. Rocos narrated the programmes saying 'we', indicating her connection with Rio.

In 2017 she appeared in a Channel 5 reality show, Celebrity 5 Go Motorhoming.

== Radio, music, producer and film ==
Rocos is an occasional presenter for BBC Radio London. She has collaborated on some pop music singles, such as Love Dilemma in the 1980s – a traditionally-crooned number with the Enrico Valdez Orchestra – and 1993 dance track Back to Love with the band Vertigo (which disbanded when they learnt that their music was the last thing a woman murdered in Manchester had listened to). She is not named on the latter's sleeve, beyond a small co-writing credit.

She co-produced a revival of The Seven-Year Itch for the London stage, starring Daryl Hannah, in 2000. In 2005, Rocos produced ...Sex Actually, a special episode of The Comic Strip Presents in which a murder occurs amongst a group of swingers.

Her film credits include Mel Brooks's 1981 comedy History of the World, Part I, the 1983 comedy horror spoof Bloodbath at the House of Death (with Kenny Everett), Lindsay Shonteff's Number One Gun (1990), and Baby Juice Express (2004).

== Writer ==
Rocos' autobiographical book Bananas Forever: Kenny Everett and Me (co-authored by Richard Topping), detailing her relationship with Everett, was published in 1998 but later reissued under the title Kenny and Me. She has contributed travel articles to publications such as The Daily Telegraph.

Rocos's book The Power of Positive Drinking, published by Random House, covers how to drink well and avoid the pitfalls.

== Business career ==
In 2012 Rocos launched a brand of tequila called AquaRiva, made from 100% 'Weber Azul' agave.

== References and sources ==
Sources

- Gorman, Dave (2012). Dave Gorman Vs the Rest of the World. Ebury Press. ISBN 978-0-09-192848-3. Archived from the original on 30 April 2024.
