= Masterpiece (Nathan album) =

Studio album by Nathan
- Released: 9 October 2006
- Recorded: 2004–2006
- Genre: R&B
- Length: 67:17
- Label: Mona Records
- Producer: Wayne Lawes, Rickardo Reid, Michael Daley, Salaam Remi, Saleem, StayBent Krunk-a-Delic

Nathan chronology
Masterpiece (2006)	3D – Determination, Dedication, Desire (2011)

Singles from Masterpiece
- 1. "Come into My Room" Released: 21 January 2005; 2. "Round and Round" Released: 21 April 2006; 3. "Cold as Ice" Released: 7 July 2006; 4. "Do Without My Love" Released: 12 March 2007

"Masterpiece" is the debut album from British R&B singer Nathan. The album was released on 9 October 2006 in the UK. The album features four singles including "Round and Round", "Cold as Ice", the top 40 hit "Come into My Room" and the latest single "Do Without my Love".

== Track listing ==
1. Round And Round
2. Get To Know You Better
3. Kiss Me
4. The Right Way
5. Do Without My Love
6. Snatch
7. Come into My Room
8. What's Your Name
9. They Can't Take Me Away
10. Cold As Ice
11. Masterpiece Pt. 1
12. You Make Me Feel
13. Everybody Needs Somebody
14. Masterpiece Pt. 2
15. Just Wanna Love You
16. Cold As Ice (Salaam Mix) (featuring Rick Ross)
17. We Got It (hidden track)

== Chart performance ==
Chart (2005)	Peak position
UK Albums Chart	122

== Release history ==
Country	Release date	Format
United Kingdom	9 October 2006	CD
United Kingdom	26 March 2007	Digital download
