= Broadcasting Code =

The Broadcasting Code (2020) is a code of practice issued by the Office of Communications (Ofcom) in the UK that requires standards of good conduct for broadcasters. This elaborates on the Communications Act 2003 section 319 and others, on duties of broadcasters to contribute positively to public life by preventing hate speech, being impartial, accurate, reflecting UK diversity, and other duties.

== See also ==
- UK enterprise law
