= Bennetts =

Motorcycle insurance broker

Bennetts Motorcycling Services Limited
- Type: Private
- Industry: Finance and Insurance
- Founded: 1930; 96 years ago
- Headquarters: Peterborough, United Kingdom
- Key people: Frederick James Bennett, founder Gordon Bennett, founders son Vincent Chaney, current Managing Director
- Products: Financial services
- Parent: www.lucidagroup.com
- Website: www.bennetts.co.uk

Bennetts Motorcycling Services Limited is a specialist insurance broker for motorcycles headquartered in Peterborough, with a contact centre in Coventry, owned by Lucida Group since May 2021.

== History ==
Bennetts was founded by Frederick J Bennett in 1930 in Coventry. Trading as F.J. Bennett and Sons, they initially provided general insurance services for customers in the West Midlands. By the early 1980s, trading as G.F. Bennett and Co and managed by Frederick's son Gordon, the company focussed on providing motorcycle insurance. Additionally, The Times newspaper noted: "It also offers Travel Insurance provided by Aspen Syndicate which underwrites for Lloyds Insurance."

In 2000, Bennetts launched a quote and buy on-line facility. It was acquired by the BGL Group in 2001. In 2009, Bennetts was one of “more than a dozen” insurance companies criticised for only offering insurance to people with an existing motorcycle licence.

In 2011, the company launched a commercial portal dedicated to motorcycling, followed in 2012 by a social networking group, Bike Social.

On 28 January 2015, it was announced that Saga Group was to purchase Bennetts from BGL Group for a reported £26.26m, completed on 1 July 2015. On 1 December 2019, Bennetts stopped trading through Saga Services Limited, changing to Bennetts Motorcycling Services Limited, remaining part of the Saga group of companies. The Guardian newspaper described Saga's acquisition as: "Saga roars into middle-aged biker market with new acquisition." In a related article, the newspaper noted Saga had paid: "£26m to snap up the motorbike insurer Bennetts, which specialises in providing cover for trophy rides such as Harley Davidsons, Triumphs and Ducatis."

On 17 February 2020, it was announced that Atlanta Group (part of the Ardonagh Group) had agreed to purchase Bennetts from Saga for £26 million. However, it was subsequently reported that: "The sale of Bennetts motorcycle insurance to the Ardonagh Group has been reversed by the Competition and Markets Authority". Subsequently The Ardonagh Group were obliged to sell Benetts by the CMA and it was purchased for an undisclosed sum in May 2021 by Right Choice Holdings, which then evolved into Lucida Group incorporating Bennetts, Right Choice Insurance Brokers (RCIB) and Moorhouse.

In the autumn of 2022, the company began offering car insurance.

== Administration fees ==
Bennetts is an insurance broker, comparing prices from a panel of insurers who underwrite the insurance policy and set pricing, as well as handling claims. As an intermediary, fees are a necessary source of income to cover the costs of arranging and administering policies on behalf of customers. A full explanation of Bennetts fees and charges can be found in their terms and conditions.

== Sponsorships ==
Bennetts is an active sponsor of motorcycle championships, race teams, events and individual racers. Bennetts have a longstanding association with the British Superbike Championship as title sponsor for the 2005-2008, 2018-2020 and 2023-2024 seasons.

Bennetts is the official insurance partner to the Isle of Man TT races and title sponsor of the Isle of Man Classic TT races. They are also the headline sponsor of the Isle of Man Lightweight TT race and a personal sponsor of Isle of Man TT racer John McGuinness ("King of the Mountain").

Previously, Bennetts has been title sponsor of the Suzuki team in the British Superbike Championship, a personal sponsor of various high profile riders, including Neil Hodgson, James Toseland, Cal Crutchlow, Scott Redding and young riders Joe Francis and Rory Skinner.

Bennetts backed long-distance motorcyclist and author Nick Sanders in his 'Final Ride', which Motorcycle News described as: "Nick’s circumnavigation of the world on his Yamaha Ténéré 700, which began in 2019 and was interrupted by the Covid lockdowns when he reached Australia the following year. Sanders resumed his trip in March 2022, finally returning to the UK in January 2023."

== See also ==
- BGL Group
- Compare the Market
- Saga plc
