= Louis-Auguste-Victor, Count de Ghaisnes de Bourmont =

French general (1773–1846)

Louis-Auguste-Victor, Count de Ghaisnes de Bourmont M.F.
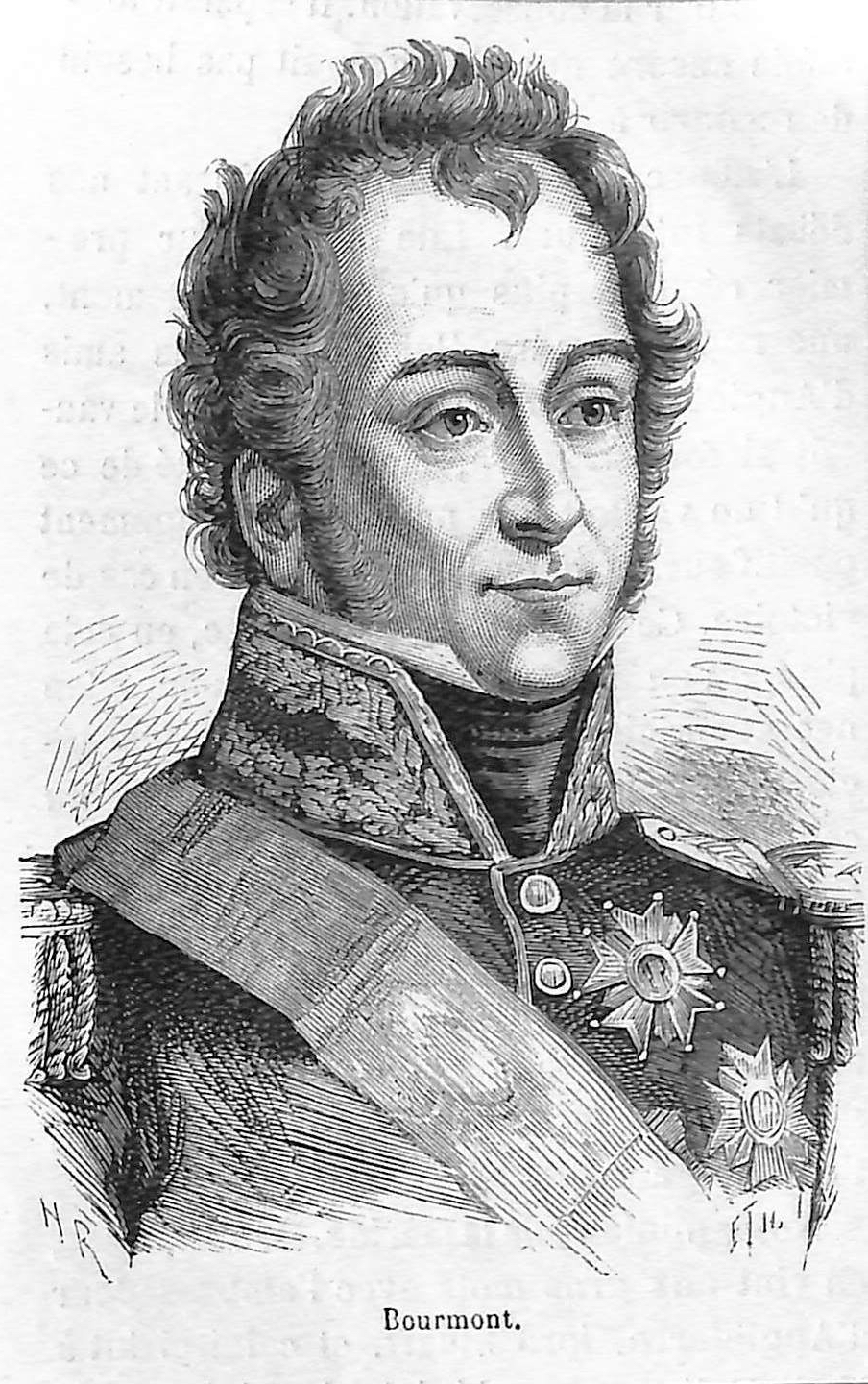
- Louis-Auguste-Victor, Count de Ghaisnes de Bourmont
- Born: 2 September 1773; Freigné, Kingdom of France
- Died: 27 October 1846 (aged 73) Freigné, France
- Allegiance: (Kingdom of France) Royalists 1789–1800; First French Empire 1807–1815 (Kingdom of France) France 1815–1830; Portugal 1832–1834
- Branch: Staff
- Service years: 1789–1800, 1807–1830, 1832–1834
- Rank: Marshal of France
- Conflicts: French Revolutionary Wars; Napoleonic Wars; Spanish expedition (1823); Shipwreck of Dellys (1830); Invasion of Algiers in 1830; Liberal Wars
- Other work: Minister of War

Louis-Auguste-Victor, Count de Ghaisnes de Bourmont (2 September 1773 – 27 October 1846) was a French general, diplomat, and statesman who was named Marshal of France in 1830. A lifelong royalist, he emigrated from France soon after the outbreak of the French Revolution. Bourmont would later join the counter-revolutionary Army of Condé for two years, before joining the insurrection in France for three more years before going into exile. Returning to France he was arrested after assisting the Georges Cadoudal conspiracy, but escaped prison to Portugal.

In 1807, he took advantage of an amnesty to rejoin the French army and served in several campaigns until 1814. He rose in rank to become a général de division in the imperial army. During this period, he was suspected of being an agent of the Comte d'Artois, and of passing information to France's enemies. Though he was notoriously anti-Napoleon and many officers did not trust him, he was employed again during the Hundred Days. Immediately after the campaign began, he deserted to the Prussian army with Napoleon's plans.

Bourmont would give evidence against Michel Ney in 1815. King Louis XVIII gave Bourmont a command in the Spanish expedition of 1823. Charles X (the former Comte d'Artois), put Bourmont in command of the Invasion of Algiers in 1830. Despite Bourmont's military success, in his absence, the absolutist rule of Charles X fell to the July Revolution. Bourmont refused to recognize King Louis Philippe I. After being involved in a plot against the new government, he fled to Portugal in 1832, where he led the army of Dom Miguel in the Liberal Wars. After the liberals won, Bourmont fled to the Papal states. Bourmont lived in Rome until he accepted another amnesty in 1840, and died in France six years later.

== Early life ==
Bourmont was born at the Château de Bourmont in modern day Freigné (then part of Anjou), to an old Angevin noble family, long established in the region.

He had a rigorous and classical upbringing, with strong emphasis on faith and loyalty. His mother, Joséphine Sophie de Coutances, played an important role in maintaining family bonds and values that would be tested during the turmoil of the French Revolution.

As a youth, he attended the Abbaye-école de Sorèze, a prestigious military style school, where he had contemporaries such as Henri de La Rochejacquelein (who would become a leading royalist fighting in the War in the Vendée).

== Response to revolution ==
=== Flight ===
On the eve of the French Revolution, aged fifteen, Bourmont entered the Gardes Françaises of the Royal Army and was present at the storming of the Bastille. After the outbreak of the French Revolution, he emigrated to Turin with his father in 1789.

=== In service to the Bourbons (1792-1801) ===
At the insistence of his mother, Bourmont served in Louis Joseph de Bourbon, Prince de Condé (and the future Charles X's) royalist army in the campaigns of 1792 and 1793 taking part in the Battles of Wissembourg and Valmy. He served as chief of staff of the royalist forces in the Chouannerie revolt from 1794 to 1796, during which time he would often act as an intermediary between General Scepeaux [Fr] and the Bourbons in exile.

After fleeing to Switzerland in 1796, Bourmont was made colonel in the service of the Count of Artois the next year.

Bourmont sneaked into France in disguise to meet with General Jean-Charles Pichegru. After fleeing to London to avoid capture, he was made commander-in-chief of the Chouan army and defeated Republican forces at Saumur. He then concluded a peace agreement with Napoleon.

However, Bourmont did not remain inactive, and he was arrested in 1801 because of involvement with Georges Cadoudal, with whom he was suspected of complicity in the kidnapping [Fr] of Senator Clément de Ris but three years later he managed to escape imprisonment to Portugal.

=== A soldier of the Empire (1807-1814) ===
When Junot invaded Portugal in 1807, Bourmont offered him his services and was employed as chief of staff of General Louis Henri Loison's division. Arrested when re-entering France in 1809, he was released upon the intercession of Junot and employed in the Imperial Army.

He served in Italy and on the staff of Prince Eugène during the Russian campaign of 1812. Taken prisoner during the retreat from Moscow, he managed to escape and rejoin the French army. After the Battle of Lützen in 1813 he was promoted to général de brigade. Bourmont took part in the Battle of the Nations at Leipzig. In 1814, he was promoted to général de division for defending Nogent-sur-Seine, during the engagement he suffered a wound to his knee. After the fall of Napoleon, Bourmont rallied to the restored Bourbons.

== Bourbon Restoration and the Hundred days ==
However, the Bourbon restoration was not secure, Napoleon escaped Elba and made his way to Paris. At Grenoble, troops sent to stop him had defected. The Government of Louis XVIII frantically tried to stop Napoleon's march on Paris. Marshal Ney was ordered to report to Besançon, where he was to receive his orders from Bourmont. It irritated the proud Ney, Prince of the Moskva, to take instructions from such a junior general, so he demanded to see the king. During his interview with Louis, Ney boasted to the king that he would bring back the former emperor in an iron cage.

By the time Ney arrived in Besançon, he found that the royalist position was rapidly deteriorating and that Bourmont's assignment was to spy on him. At Besançon, Ney's direct subordinates were Bourmont and General Claude Lecourbe. Lecourbe was a strange companion for Bourmont the arch-royalist; a committed Republican Lecourbe had been removed from command upon the proclamation of the French Empire and deeply detested Napoleon for it.

Bourmont assessed Napoleon as having nearly 14,000 men under arms marching with him to Paris, while Ney commanded only 5,000 and of those many were of dubious loyalty. For all of Ney's bravado the situation was deteriorating. On 11 March 1815, Ney told Bourmont and Lecourbe that he was going over to Napoleon's camp, after lengthy discussion. During these, Ney justified his actions not as military necessity but instead by complaining about treatment to his honour and his wife's honour by royalists. Ney decided to read a proclamation sent to him by Napoleon, Bourmont and Lecourbe did not agree but did give it sanction of their presence. Bourmont even wrote the orders calling the troops to assemble for parade.

Bourmont slipped away to Paris on the 15th March to warn the king, that the Bourbon cause was collapsing, precipitating Louis to flee to Belgium, followed by hundreds of royalists, Bourmont not amongst them.

According to historian David Hamilton-Williams, the Comte d'Artois asked Bourmont to remain a royalist agent. Bourmont requested to continue in command, but the new Minister of War, Marshal Davout refused to employ Bourmont. Davout would go as far as writing to Napoleon, "I cannot sit idly and watch this officer wear the uniform of this country; his treasonous statements concerning the Emperor are well known to all; the brigade and regimental commanders of the 14th Infantry Division despise him. Who would trust such a man?" Nevertheless, General Gérard, leader of the IV Corps, vouched for him so he retained his position.

On the morning of the 15th June, as the French Army of the North advanced into Belgium, the 14th Division led the IV Corps column of march. Near Florennes, Bourmont halted his division. On the pretence of scouting ahead, he and his staff, rode ahead with a squadron of lancers. After gaining a suitable distance from French lines, he sent the lancers back with a letter for Gérard. In the missive, he explained that he was deserting but promised, "They will not get any information from me which will injure the French army, composed of men I love." He and his staff put the white Bourbon cockade on their hats and galloped for the nearest Prussian position. He immediately handed over Napoleon's operational plans to the Prussians. Blücher's chief of staff Gneisenau was pleased to receive this windfall. However, Blücher had no use for turncoats and called Bourmont a traitor to his face. When Gneisenau noted that Bourmont was wearing the white cockade, making them allies, Blücher screamed, "Cockade be damned! A dirty dog is always a dirty dog!"

With Napoleon's orders in their hands, the Prussians were able to take the appropriate countermeasures to gather their army. Bourmont's defection enraged the French rank and file. Though their loyalty to Napoleon was absolute, they began to suspect treachery in their generals. Étienne Hulot, who became the acting division commander, was compelled to give a speech that pledged loyalty to Napoleon and the tricolor.

== The Trial of Marshal Ney ==
After the Battle of Waterloo and Napoleon's fall, Bourmont gave evidence at Ney's trial. In the intervening time, Lecourbe had died, Bourmont expected that Lecourbe's perspective would not be presented to him during testimony.

Bourmont testified that he had been a reluctant spectator to the Marshals defection, testifying that in the early morning of the 15th March, Ney had told him and Lecourbe that fighting Napoleon was not possible. But both he and Lecourbe had opposed Ney. Asked why he had joined Ney at the parade, he replied that he had done so only to observe.

The most controversial part of Bourmont's testimony was his statement that:

Marshal Ney, was so thoroughly resolved beforehand to take the side of Bonaparte, that half an hour after reading the proclamation he was wearing the Grand Eagle of the Legion of Honour with the effigy of the usurper.

— Bourmont, at the trial of Ney

If true, this statement would undermine Ney's defence that he only changed sides out of necessity and to prevent needless loss of French lives in a civil war. Ney outraged by Bourmont's statements called him a liar and in a short speech, reminded Bourmont that a higher tribunal (god) would judge them both and that Lecourbe could still be called as a witness at the gates of St. Peter.

During questioning by the judge, Bourmont admitted to having drawn up the order for the troops to parade. When examined about whether resistance by Ney was possible given the difference in numbers of troops, Bourmont replied that:

Everything depended on the first step, if he had taken a carbine and fired the first shot, no doubt his example would have been decisive, for no man had a greater empire over the minds of the soldiers.

— Bourmont, at the trial of Ney

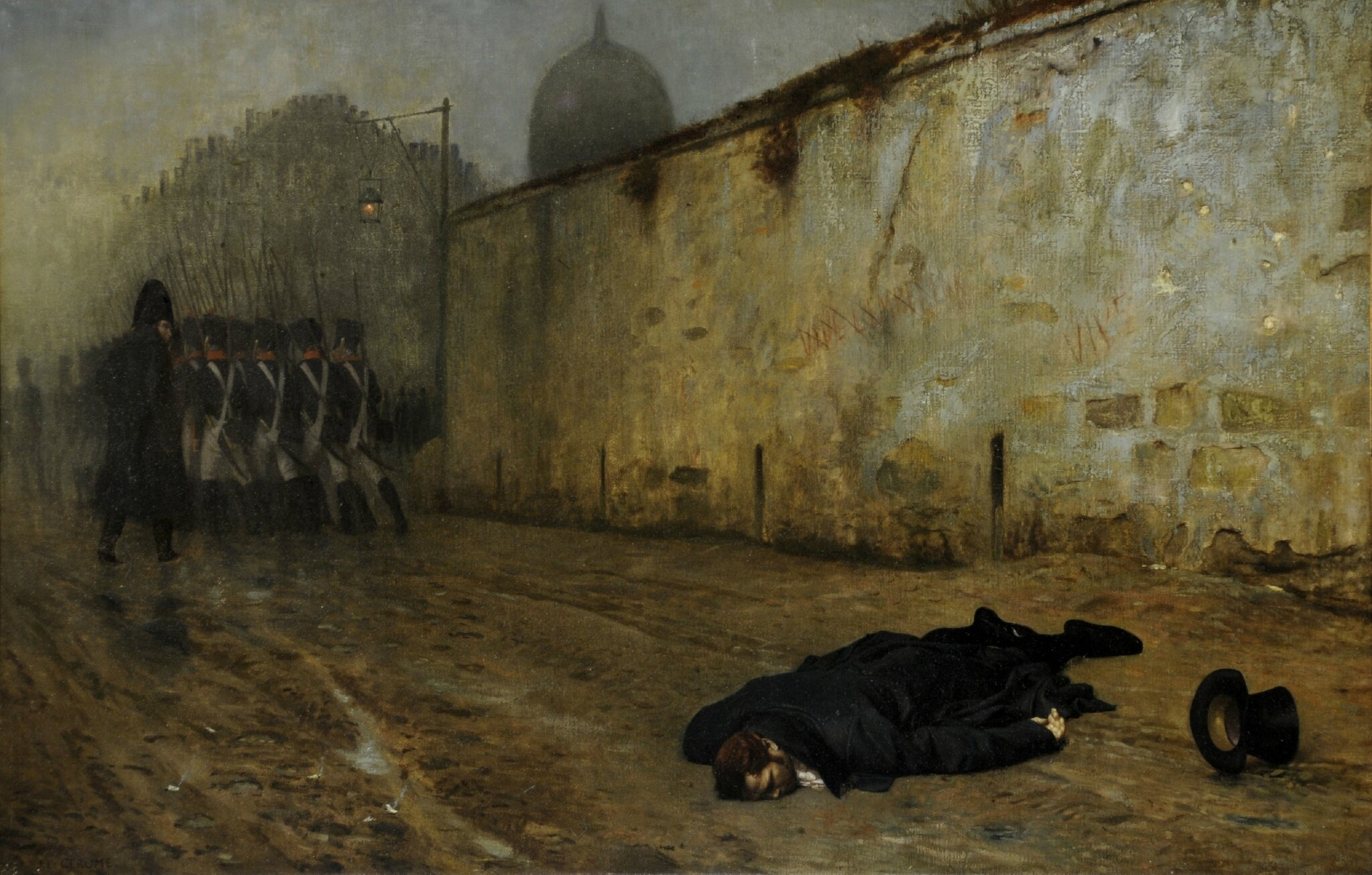
The Execution of Marshal Ney, by Gérôme 1868

Later testimony given by Lecourbe before his death was read, that partially contradicted Bourmont suggesting that there was no prospect for resistance, and that even in the absence of the proclamation the troops would likely have defected in any case. Further witnesses told of Ney's actions after the parade attempting to paint him as suddenly loyal to Napoleon but even these witnesses who had seen Ney during the parade and in the days after it contradicted Bourmont's testimony that Ney was wearing the Grand Eagle decoration even if they were otherwise positive to the prosecution's case. Nevertheless the court rendered a guilty verdict and Ney was sentenced to execution.

Bourmont would also give evidence against Jean-Gérard Bonnaire [Fr].

== Service after the second restoration, Spain, Algeria then exile ==
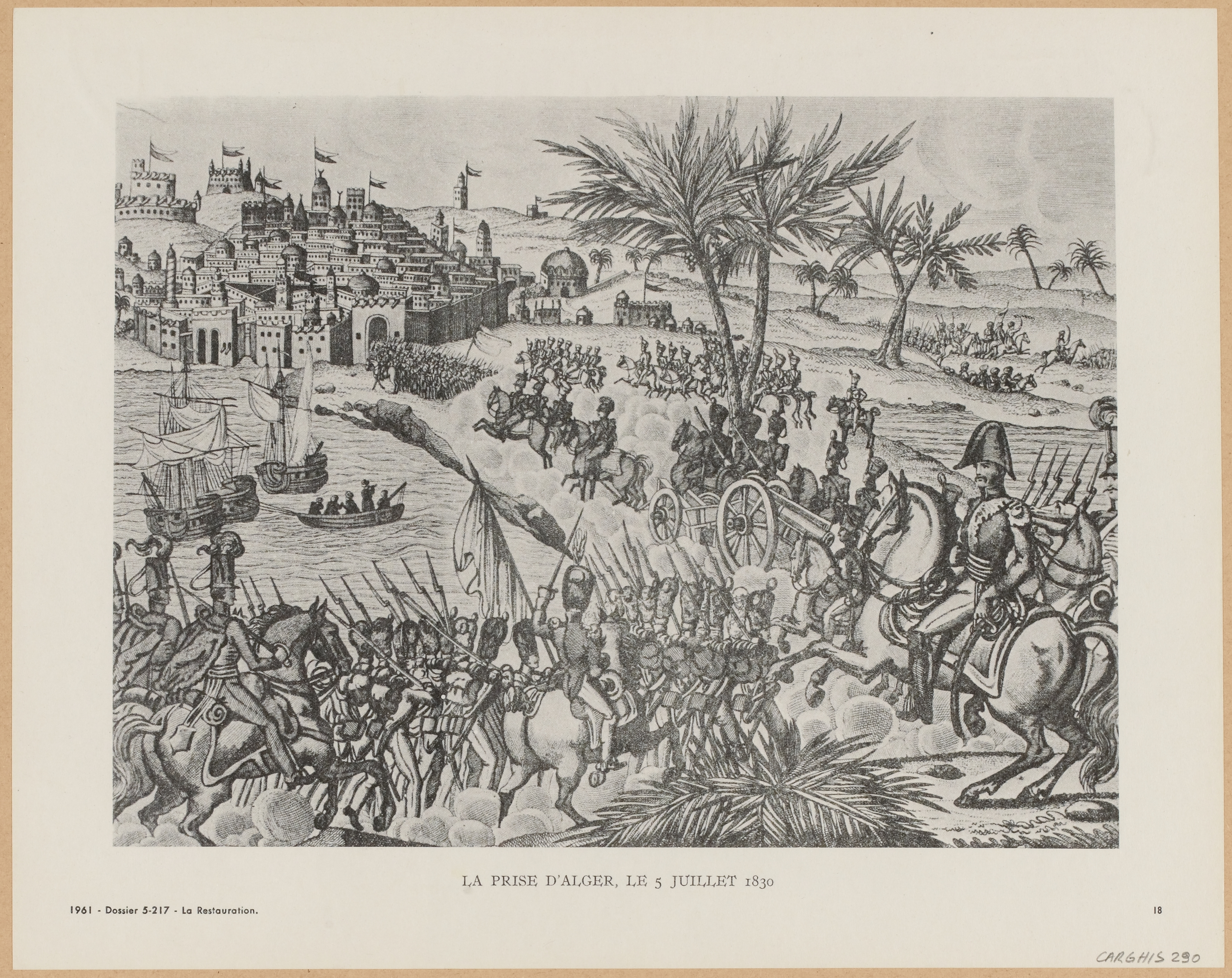
French troops march on Algiers, the 5th July 1830

After the Second Restoration, he was given command of the 16th infantry division in Besançon and took part in the Spanish campaign of 1823 where, he won the battle of Sanlucar, and took Seville. King Charles X of France made him minister of war in 1829 and in 1830, was appointed commander of forces mustering to invade Algeria.

The Invasion of Algiers in 1830, was launched objectively as a response to the fly-whisk affair but in reality launched to shore up support for the absolutist monarchy. Bourmont was successful in defeating the Deylik of Algiers and was appointed Marshal of France as a reward. But in his absence the July Revolution overthrew Charles X. Bourmont refused to give his allegiance to the new King Louis Philippe I and was replaced by Bertrand Clauzel as commander in Algeria. Bourmont hoped to lead his army back to France in the name of Charles, but lacking support amongst the rank and file he went into exile in Spain.

In 1832 Marshal Bourmont took part in the rising of Caroline Ferdinande Louise, Duchesse de Berry, and on its failure fled to Portugal. He commanded the army of the absolutist monarch King Miguel during the Liberal Wars. The Miguelists would be defeated by the constitutional party, Bourmont fled once more to the Papal States.

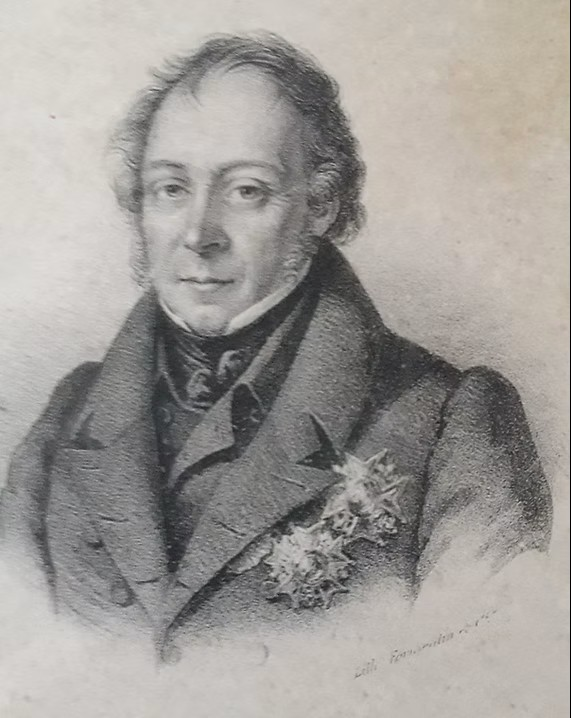
An older Bourmont, wearing his decorations on an overcoat - Order of Saint Louis, the second may be the Order of Saint Ferdinand of Spain. A third honour is hidden by the overcoat.

At the amnesty of 1840, he returned to France, but continued to support the legitimist Bourbon pretender Henri, Count de Chambord. He died on the 27 October 1846 at the Château de Bourmont.

== Honours ==
Knight of Saint-Louis, May 13, 1796

Legion of Honour

Peer of France, October 9, 1823

== Notes ==
Political offices
Preceded by Louis Victor de Blacquetot de Caux	Minister of War; 8 August 1829 – 31 July 1830	Succeeded by Étienne Maurice Gérard
