= Baadasss TV =

British television series

Baadasss TV is a British television series, devoted to youth-oriented fashion and culture, which aired on Channel 4 in 1994. The series, presented by Andi Oliver and American rapper Ice-T, was "the first British series to explore the wilder side of black culture".

The show was made by the production company Rapido TV, also responsible for Eurotrash and Passengers. It broke the mould of "po-faced" minority programming such as the BBC's Ebony. As well as an appearance of Lee 'Scratch' Perry, the show featured "soft-pornography, rapping dwarves, paintings made from elephant droppings and fitness fanatics Juicy Julia and the Raggaerobics crew".

Some commentators criticised Baadasss TV as a "stereotyped freak show". Trevor Phillips, then a LWT producer, attacked the programme as "just another nigger minstrel show", reinforcing black stereotypes of 'gangsters, pimps, whores and freaks'. However, the show had its defenders. Patrick Younge, producer of the very different 1995 magazine show Black Britain, argued that the real problem was a broader lack of television aimed at black audiences:

The real trouble is that [Baadasss TV is] the only black programme on TV. It does what it does well - if it was part of a whole spectrum of shows, people wouldn't have a problem with it.

In 1996 Baadasss TV was "taken off the air for its lack of political correctness".
