= Battle of the Tombettes =

Coordinates: 48.4191°N 1.2338°W

- Part of the Chouannerie
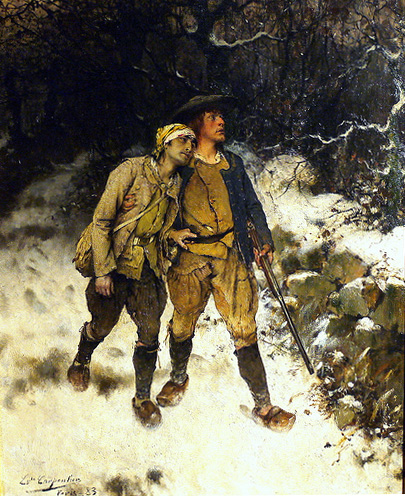
- Chouans en déroute, oil on canvas of Évariste Carpentier, 1883.
Date	25 January 1800
Location	Between Le Châtellier and Parigné, France
Result	Republican victory

Belligerents
(France) Republicans	(Kingdom of France) Chouans

Commanders and leaders
Charles Dumoulin	Aimé Picquet du Boisguy; Auguste Hay de Bonteville; Louis Picquet du Boisguy

Strength
Between 500 and 4,500 men	2,000 men

Casualties and losses
Unknown	50 deaths

The Battle of the Tombettes took place in 1800, between the Chouans and the Republicans during the Chouannerie.

== Prelude ==
The victory of the Chouans at the Battle of Saint James had brought them a reprieve, quickly Republican troops came in support to occupy massively the country of Fougères and the country of Avranches. On January 24, 1,200 men arrived in reinforcement from Rennes, at Saint James General Dumoulin also received reinforcements from Avranches.

Aimé du Boisguy therefore decided to evacuate the country of Fougères, leaving only four companies responsible for guerrilla warfare. Boisguy did not know at this time the submission of Anjou, he decided to go south to gather the troops of Vitré, La Guerche-de-Bretagne and Bas-Maine, he sent letters to the officers of these divisions, asking them to gather all their troops.

== The battle ==
On 26 January, Boisguy's army assembled to set out. There was, however, a clash between 4 Chouan companies going to the rally and a Republican detachment who retreated to Fougères after losing 18 men. 4,500 men according to Pontbriand then went out of the city and repulsed the four companies, then arrived at the sight of the troops of Boisguy who came in reinforcement, however the two troops retreated without fighting. To their surprise, the Chouans, however, continued to hear Republican fire long after their departure. But Boisguy did not attach importance to these actions: he planned to go to Vitré bypassing the east, but he had to go to Parigné first, where he had ammunition made lacking his soldiers because of too many skirmishes. Boisguy therefore decided to postpone his departure until the next day and to camp at Parigné for the night. The chouans took the road to Vieuville for Parigné and arrived at the place called Tombettes. The Republicans commanded by General Dumoulin awaited them in excellent training and well positioned. Dumoulin, who was going to Fougères, had heard the shooting earlier in the day and had guessed the retreat of the Chouans. Soon, the Republicans began encirclement maneuvers.

Boisguy judged that it was impossible to avoid the fight and decided to try a breakthrough. The chouans launched the attack and the chouan avant-garde commanded by Bertrand de Saint-Gilles managed to push back the front lines of the Republicans and make their way. But the cartridges were missing from the Chouans and attacked on the flanks and behind, they were dislocated and routed, 50 of them were killed, hundreds scattered on all sides. According to the Republicans, the losses of the Chouans were 800 dead. However, Dumoulin chose not to pursue them and left for Fougères. Boisguy managed to get to Parigné, but could only gather 1,000 to 1,200 of his men.

== Consequences ==
Boisguy's plan had almost no chance of success, especially when, the day after the battle, he was made aware of the surrender of Anjou. Hoping for help from the English and the Emigrants, Boisguy remained under arms until February 17, when he learned that the Morbihan and Cadoudal had stopped the fight. The next day he signed his surrender with General Brune at Rennes. The war was over.

== Bibliography ==
- Christian Le Boutellier (1989). La Révolution dans le Pays de Fougères. Société archéologique et historique de l'arrondissement de Fougères. pp. 701–702.
- du Breil de Pontbriand, Toussaint (1897). Mémoire du colonel de Pontbriand.
- Lemas, Théodore (1894). Le district de Fougères pendant les Guerres de l'Ouest et de la Chouannerie 1793-1800. Rue des Scribes Editions.
- du Breil de Pontbriand, Marie-Paul (1904). La Découvrance (ed.). Un chouan, le général du Boisguy. Paris: édition Honoré Champion (published 1994). pp. 431–433.
- de La Sicotière, Léon (1889). Louis de Frotté et les insurrections normandes, 1793-1832. Vol. II. Plon.
- Jourdan, Félix (1907). La chouannerie dans l'Avranchin, 2e partie (PDF). p. 239. Archived from the original (PDF) on 3 March 2016.
