= The Things of Life =

- Theatrical release poster
- French: Les Choses de la vie
- Directed by: Claude Sautet
- Screenplay by: Paul Guimard; Jean-Loup Dabadie; Claude Sautet
- Dialogue by: Jean-Loup Dabadie
- Based on: Intersection by Paul Guimard
- Produced by: Raymond Danon
- Starring: Michel Piccoli; Romy Schneider
- Cinematography: Jean Boffety
- Edited by: Jacqueline Thiédot
- Music by: Philippe Sarde
- Production companies: Lira Films; Sonocam S.A.; Fida Cinematografica
- Distributed by: CFDC (France); Fida Cinematografica (Italy)
- Release dates: 13 March 1970 (France); 18 April 1970 (Italy)
- Running time: 89 minutes
- Countries: France; Italy; Switzerland
- Language: French

The Things of Life (French: Les Choses de la vie) is a 1970 romantic drama film directed by Claude Sautet, based on the 1967 novel Intersection by Paul Guimard. The film centers around a car accident experienced by Pierre (Michel Piccoli), an architect, and the events before and after it. The film won the Louis Delluc Prize, and had 2,959,682 admissions in France, becoming the eighth highest-earning film of the year.

== Plot ==
The structure of the film involves frequent jumps in time—between the time of, and after, the car crash, and before the crash. The opening sequence jumps between the period immediately after the crash, and the crash itself.

In the French countryside on a summer morning, a lorry full of pigs stalls at a crossroads. An Alfa Romeo Giulietta Sprint swerves to avoid it and crashes into an orchard, hurling the driver, Pierre (Michel Piccoli), onto the grass. As he drifts in and out of consciousness, he revisits the essential things which make up his life.

A Paris architect in his forties driving to a meeting at Rennes, Pierre had quarreled with his lover Hélène (Romy Schneider) the previous night. They were due to leave together for a job he was offered in Tunis but he hadn't signed the documents. But he had agreed to take his teenage son Bertrand, who lived with his estranged wife Catherine, for a holiday in the family's holiday home on the Île de Ré. Stopping at a café, he wrote to Hélène calling everything off, but did not post the letter. Driving past a wedding, he decides that the letter was quite wrong and he should marry Hélène.

Rushed to hospital in Le Mans, he does not recover. As his widow, Catherine is given his effects, including the unsent letter to Hélène. Catherine is reading it by the window when she sees Hélène running to reach Pierre's bedside. She tears the letter to pieces, and Hélène is told by a nurse that she is too late.

== Cast ==
- Michel Piccoli as Pierre Bérard
- Romy Schneider as Hélène Haltig
- Gérard Lartigau as Bertrand Bérard
- Lea Massari as Catherine Bérard
- Jean Bouise as François
- Boby Lapointe as driver of the animal van
- Hervé Sand as truckdriver
- Isabelle Sadoyan as nurse
- Jacques Richard as ambulance nurse
- Betty Beckers as female hitchhiker
- Dominique Zardi as male hitchhiker
- Gabrielle Doulcet as Guitte
- Henri Nassiet as Pierre's father
- Claude Confortès as doctor
- Marie-Pierre Casey as postal worker
- Marcelle Arnold as Hélène's mother
- Jean-Pierre Zola as Hélène's father

== Production ==
The idea of making a film from Paul Guimard's novel was originally turned down by multiple financiers in France. It was the fourth feature directed by Claude Sautet, and his first to become a major success. Sautet would work with actress Romy Schneider again on further projects, including Sautet's next feature Max and the Junkmen. Sautet also hired composer Philippe Sarde to write the score. That initiated a long partnership between the two, spanning twenty-five years and eleven films. The car crash scene was shot on a crossroads specifically created for the purpose, and took two weeks to shoot.

== Release and reception ==
The film was released by Compagnie Française de Distribution Cinématographique in France and Columbia Pictures in the United States.

Variety said that "directorial tact and visual solidity, fine, sensitive playing and observant characterization give an engrossing tang to this familiar tale", and added that the film "builds interest without resort to flashy sentiments or intellectual palaver." Time Out remarked that while it's "difficult to make a film about banality without being boring in the process, but Sautet all but pulls it off, thanks to a beautifully understated performance from Piccoli." The New York Times reviewer was more critical, saying, "I should mind this syrup less if Sautet showed more of a conscience in serving it—if the relationships seemed to have been felt rather than merely displayed" but added "Piccoli is the only reasonable point of interest" in the film.

The film won the 1969 Louis Delluc Prize, and had 2,959,682 admissions in France, making it the eighth highest earning film of 1970.

Anthony Lane in The New Yorker, previewing the film for a 2009 revival, wrote that it contained one of Piccoli's "gravest performances". "Sautet's portrait of prickly love", Lane considered inferior to Godard's in Contempt (1963); however, "the leading man holds our gaze: lean, confident, and manly, removing his cigarette only to speak his lines, yet profoundly pained by the sense of a life that has veered off course".

== Remake ==
The Things of Life was remade by American director Mark Rydell in 1994 as Intersection with Richard Gere, Lolita Davidovich (as the girlfriend) and Sharon Stone (as the ex-partner). The remake was poorly received.
