= Château de Bourmont =

Converted castle in Pays de la Loire, France

Coordinates: 47°32′41″N 1°06′03″W

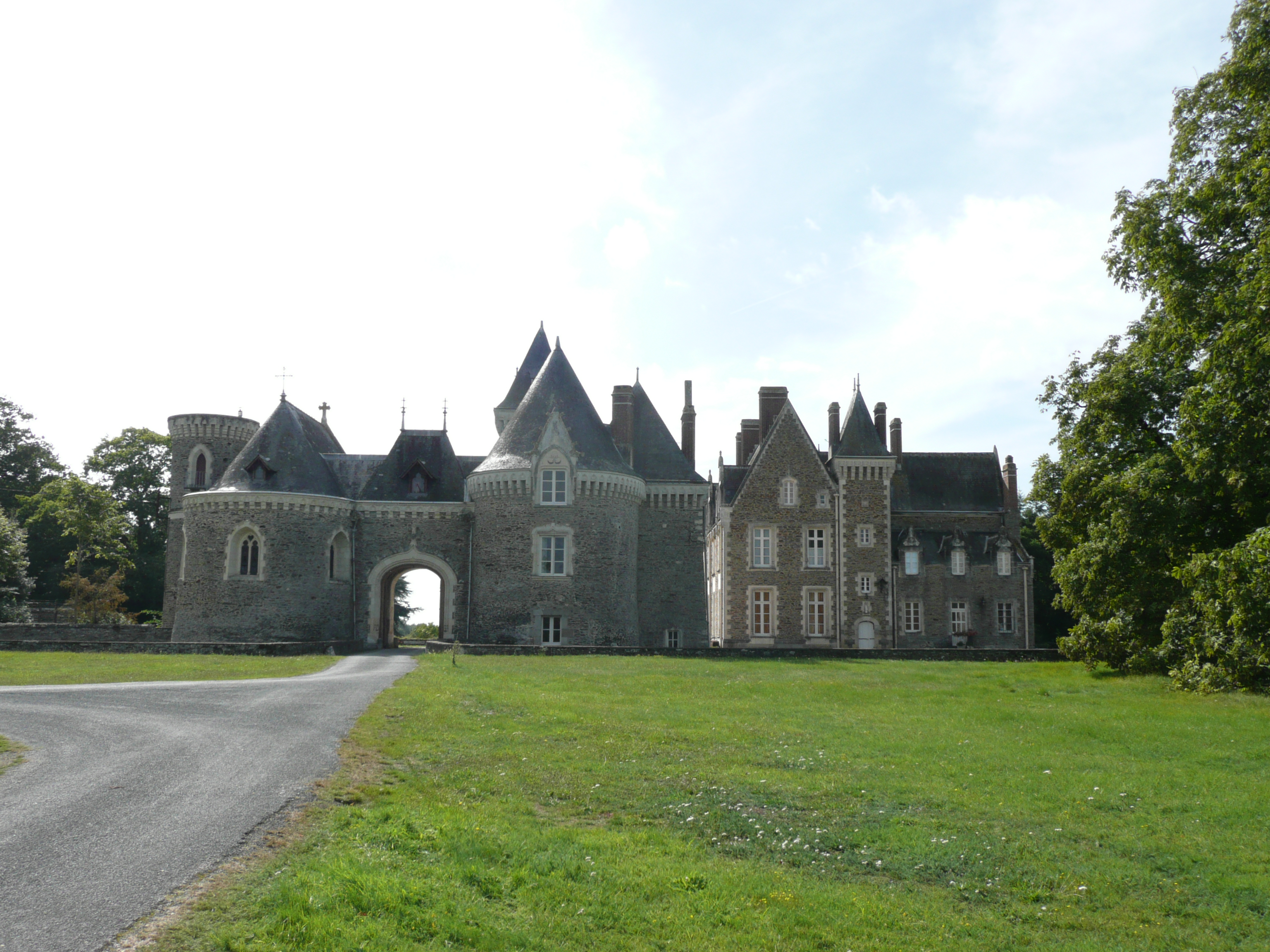

The Château de Bourmont is a converted castle in the commune of Freigné in the Loire-Atlantique département of France.

== History ==
The family of La Tour-Landry and, later, the Maillé de La Tour-Landry, held the lands of Bourmont from the 14th century. Through an alliance in 1691 between Marie-Hélène de Maillé de La Tour-Landry (1670–1752) and Marie-Henry, Count of Ghaisne (1662–1710), it passed to the family of Ghaisne de Bourmont, who still owned it as of 2013.

In 1771, the Château de Bourmont was the birthplace of Louis-Auguste-Victor, Count de Ghaisnes de Bourmont, architect of the French conquest of Algeria in 1830. The conquest led to him being appointed Maréchal de France (Marshal of France).

In 1795, during the Chouannerie, vicomte de Scépaux established his headquarters there.

== Architecture ==
There are remains of an important defensive military structure from the Middle Ages. The château was extended with the construction of buildings from the 16th century to the end of the 19th. The two commons and the orangery were built in 1702 in the Louis XIV style. The residence dates from 1892, constructed in Neo-Gothic style by Bibard and Lediberder.

== Status ==
The château is privately owned and was not open to the public until recently It has been partially listed since 1993 as a monument historique by the French Ministry of Culture.

The site is undergoing restoration work.

== See also ==
- List of castles in France
