= Georges de Caunes =

French broadcaster (1919–2004)

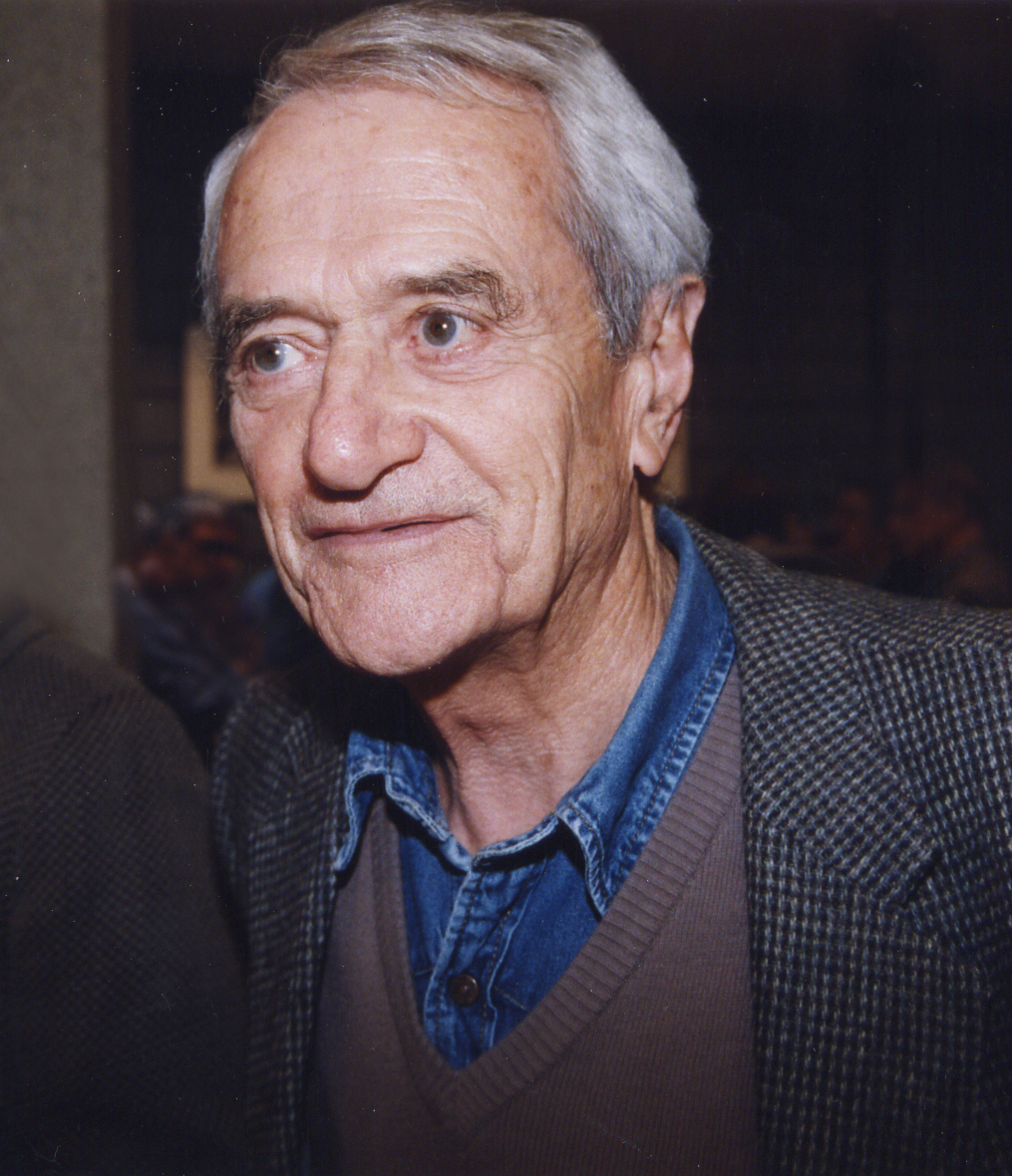
- de Caunes in 2000
- Born: 26 April 1919; Toulouse, France
- Died: 28 June 2004 (aged 85); La Rochelle, France
- Occupation: Broadcaster
- Spouse(s): Benoîte Groult (m. 1950; div. 1953) Jacqueline Joubert (m. 1953; div. 1960) Anne-Marie Carmentrez (m. 1967)
- Children: 5 (including Antoine de Caunes)
- Relatives: Emma de Caunes (granddaughter)

Louis Georges Gustave de Caunes (French: [ʒɔʁʒ də kon]; 26 April 1919 – 28 June 2004), professionally known as Georges de Caunes, was a French television and radio presenter, journalist, writer and producer whose career spanned over six decades in French language television and radio.

== Biography ==
=== Career ===
De Caunes began his career in broadcasting in 1945, shortly after the Second World War, translating Voice of America into French for Radiodiffusion française. When television was launched in 1949, De Caunes became one of the first newsreaders on National TV. He co-anchored with Pierre Tchernia and Claude Dargat. He later went freelance. In 1953 he was offered a full-time presenting job on TMC. After his success on Monaco television, De Caunes was offered a radio presenting job on the newly formed station Europe 1. Between 1964 and 1966 he was head anchor for the evening news on O.R.T.F and by 1967 he had moved to Radio Luxembourg to front the morning show.

He made guest appearances in other television productions including a few episodes of Le Voyageur des siècles. He was also the French commentator at the Eurovision Song Contest in 1971, 1975 and 1977. He was also had a passion for theatre and in 1979 wrote a play entitled Comédie pour un meurtre. He was also a keen sports presenter fronting several football matches across the world for French television

=== Personal life ===
De Caunes was married three times. His first wife was the writer Benoîte Groult, they had two daughters Blandine (born 1946) and Lison (born 1950). He left Groult for television presenter Jacqueline Joubert from whom they had a son Antoine (who is now one of France's best known entertainers and the host of Eurotrash). In 1960 De Caunes divorced Joubert and in 1967 he married reporter Anne-Marie Carmentrez they had two children together Marie and Pierre (who is now a presenter).

De Caunes became a grandfather in 1977, when his son Antoine's wife gave birth to a girl: Emma de Caunes who is now a well-known actress in France.

He was awarded both National Order of Merit and the Legion of Honour by President François Mitterrand.

=== Death and tribute ===
Following a long illness, De Caunes died on 28 June 2004. Since his death, tributes rendered him, streets and avenues named after him. Writers of adventure books receive the "literary Prix Georges de Caunes" as the book festival in La Rochelle. Since 2005, the Festival Georges de Caunes, Human Adventure Sports and takes place in Vallauris (formerly Fidlas, International Film Festival and the Book of Sports Adventure).
