= Maumusson, Loire-Atlantique =

Maumusson
- Part of Vallons-de-l'Erdre
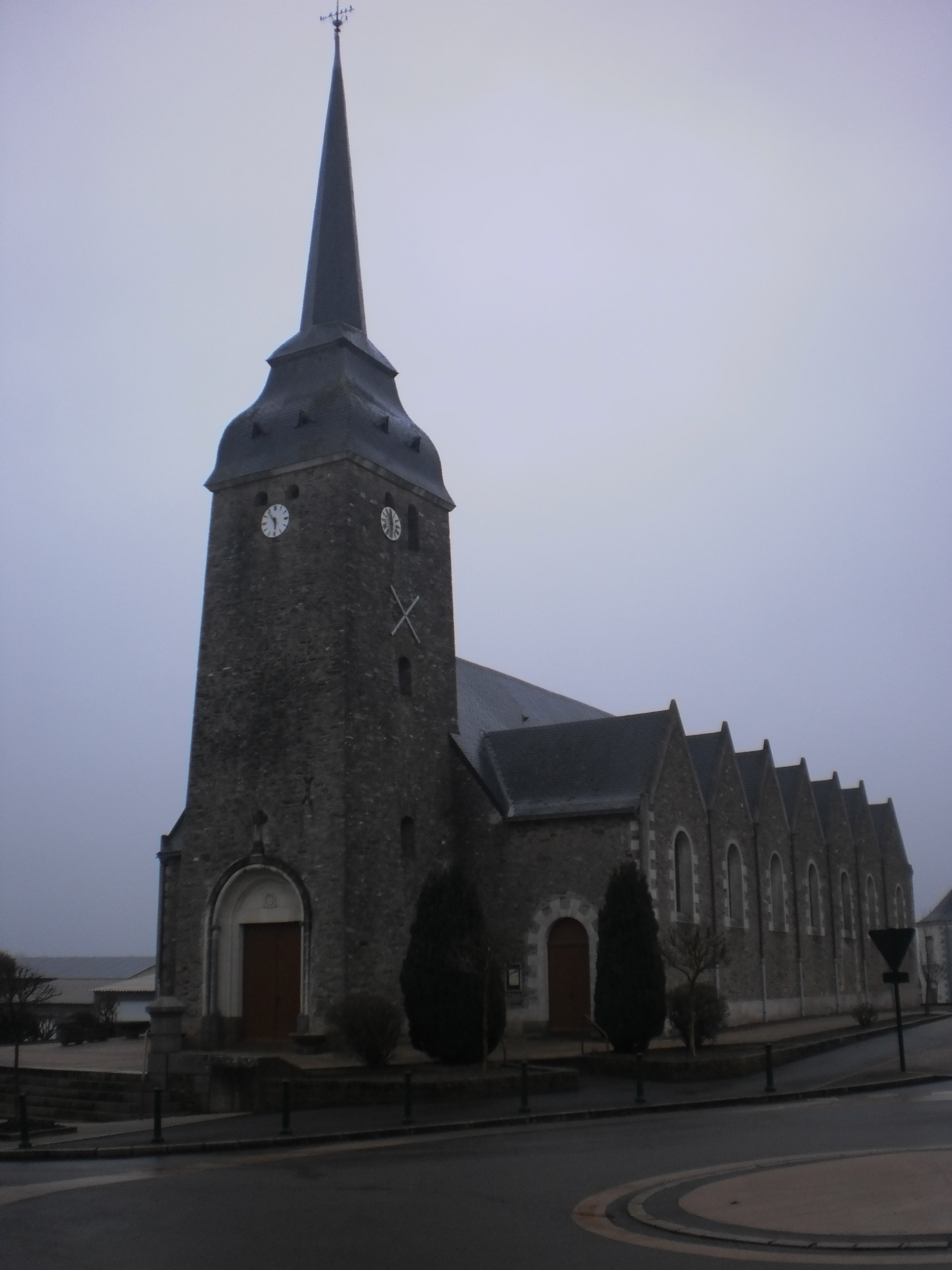
- The church in Maumusson

- Coat of arms
- Location of Maumusson
- Location within France Location within Pays de la Loire
- Coordinates: 47°29′01″N 1°06′16″W
- Country: France
- Region: Pays de la Loire
- Department: Loire-Atlantique
- Arrondissement: Châteaubriant-Ancenis
- Canton: Ancenis-Saint-Géréon
- Commune: Vallons-de-l'Erdre
- Area^{1}: 24.56 km^{2} (9.48 sq mi)
- Highest elevation: 84 m (276 ft)
- Lowest elevation: 27 m (89 ft)
- Population (2022): 1,050
  - Density: 42.8/km^{2} (111/sq mi)
- Demonym(s): Maumussonnais, Maumussonnaises
- Time zone: UTC+01:00 (CET)
  - Summer (DST): UTC+02:00 (CEST)
- Postal code: 44540
- Website: www.pays-ancenis.fr
- ^{1} French Land Register data, which excludes lakes, ponds, glaciers > 1 km^{2} (0.386 sq mi or 247 acres) and river estuaries.

Maumusson (French pronunciation: [momysɔ̃]; Breton: Malvegon) is a former commune in the Loire-Atlantique department in western France. On 1 January 2018, it was merged into the new commune of Vallons-de-l'Erdre.

== See also ==
- Communes of the Loire-Atlantique department
