= Eddy Wally =

Belgian singer

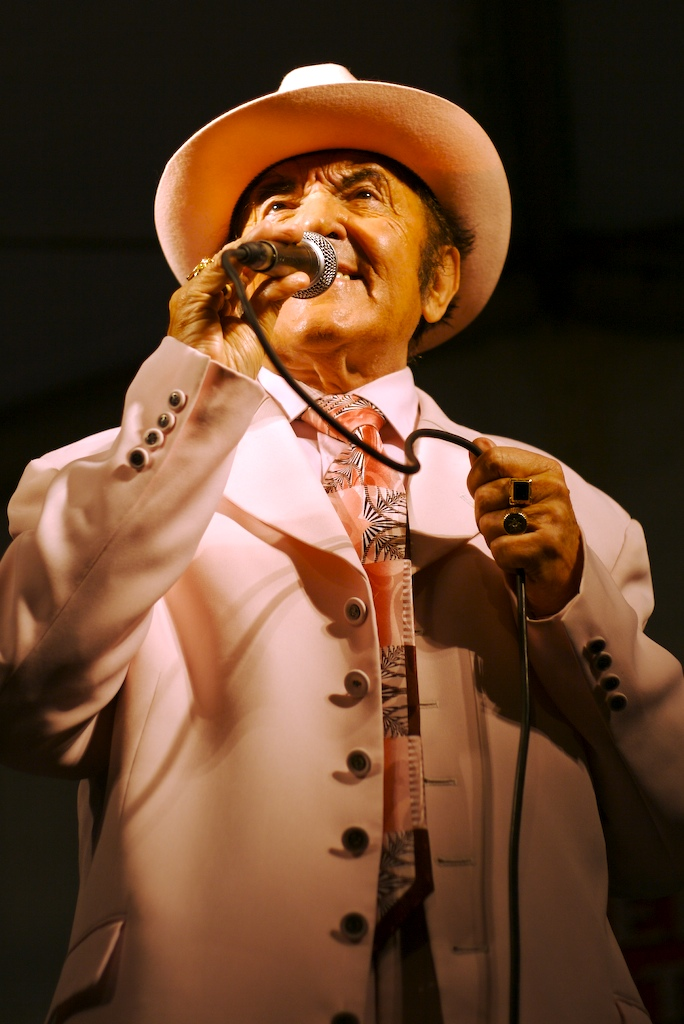
- Eddy Wally, "The Voice of Europe" (in concert), 2008

Background information
- Also known as: Eddy Wally, "Wow!" Guy
- Born: Eduard Van De Walle; 12 July 1932; Zelzate, East Flanders, Belgium
- Died: 6 February 2016 (aged 83) Zelzate, Belgium
- Genres: Pop, schlager
- Occupations: Musician, singer-songwriter, producer, actor
- Instrument: Vocals
- Years active: 1959–2012
- Website: http://www.eddywally.be

Eduard Van De Walle (12 July 1932 – 6 February 2016), known by his stage name Eddy Wally, was a Belgian schlager singer and actor from Zelzate, East Flanders, and the once self-proclaimed "Voice of Europe".

Wally enjoyed a somewhat polarizing reputation in Flanders, with most of his songs being characterized as unintentional comedy. Due to his limited vocal talent and naïve, cheesy lyrics, he could be compared with an outsider musician. On the other hand, he managed to sustain a successful career in the Flemish media for half a century. Wally also toured worldwide, including China, Australia, all of Europe, the United States, and the USSR. As Eddy Wally was short, he tended to use outside chairs in his act.

Eddy Wally was best known for his song "Chérie" which became a double-platinum hit. Wally was also known for "Ik spring uit een vliegmachien" ("I'll jump out of an aeroplane"), and "Dans Mi Amor".

== Attire and cultural iconography ==
On and off stage, Wally usually wore flashy, shiny, expensive outfits, characterized by a camp and kitsch style reminiscent of Liberace. In 2004, Eddy Wally's wardrobe was acquired by the Stedelijk Modemuseum van Hasselt, and was displayed under the title "Eddy Wally's Geweldige Garderobe". The exhibition comprised 115 custom made outfits, valued at up to $5,300 apiece.

In October 2009, famed Belgian artist Kamagurka proclaimed:

Eddy Wally is pop art.

It is still discussed whether or not the character of Eddy Wally was an act. Jan Van Rompaey, a former host of many human-interest programs and talk shows on Belgian television, interviewed Wally many times. According to him, Wally had a limited vocabulary and was not an act, although he exaggerated his eccentricity. Kamagurka reached a similar conclusion and insinuated Wally acted strange "because people expected this from a famous person". Kamagurka also revealed Wally had some kind of dyslexia and wrote all of his lyrics in his own phonetic transcription language. Wally also had trouble learning scripted lines, even the simplest ones.

Wally was also known for a video posted on YouTube in 2007 by a person from the community of him exclaiming "Wow" and winking. This had gained worldwide recognition and had become a meme, which many other YouTube users began to use in their videos for comedy.

At some point in time, the novelist Deborah Bishop was writing a biography of Wally, entitled Wow!.

== Background ==
Eddy Wally's first job was a market trader selling handbags. In the 1960s, he became popular after his association with Dutch producer Johnny Hoes. He even had his own disco "Chérie-Paris Las Vegas", first known as "Eddy Wally's Texas Bar".

Eddy Wally used to be a regular feature on the UK television programme Eurotrash, where he was renowned for his eccentric dress sense.

== Honours ==
- A main-belt asteroid is named after Eddy Wally (9205 Eddywally). It is in orbit around the Sun between Mars and Jupiter.
- Knight of the Order of Leopold, by Royal Decree of 2005.

== Death ==
Wally died on 6 February 2016, aged 83, following a stroke.
