= Vritz =

- Part of Vallons-de-l'Erdre
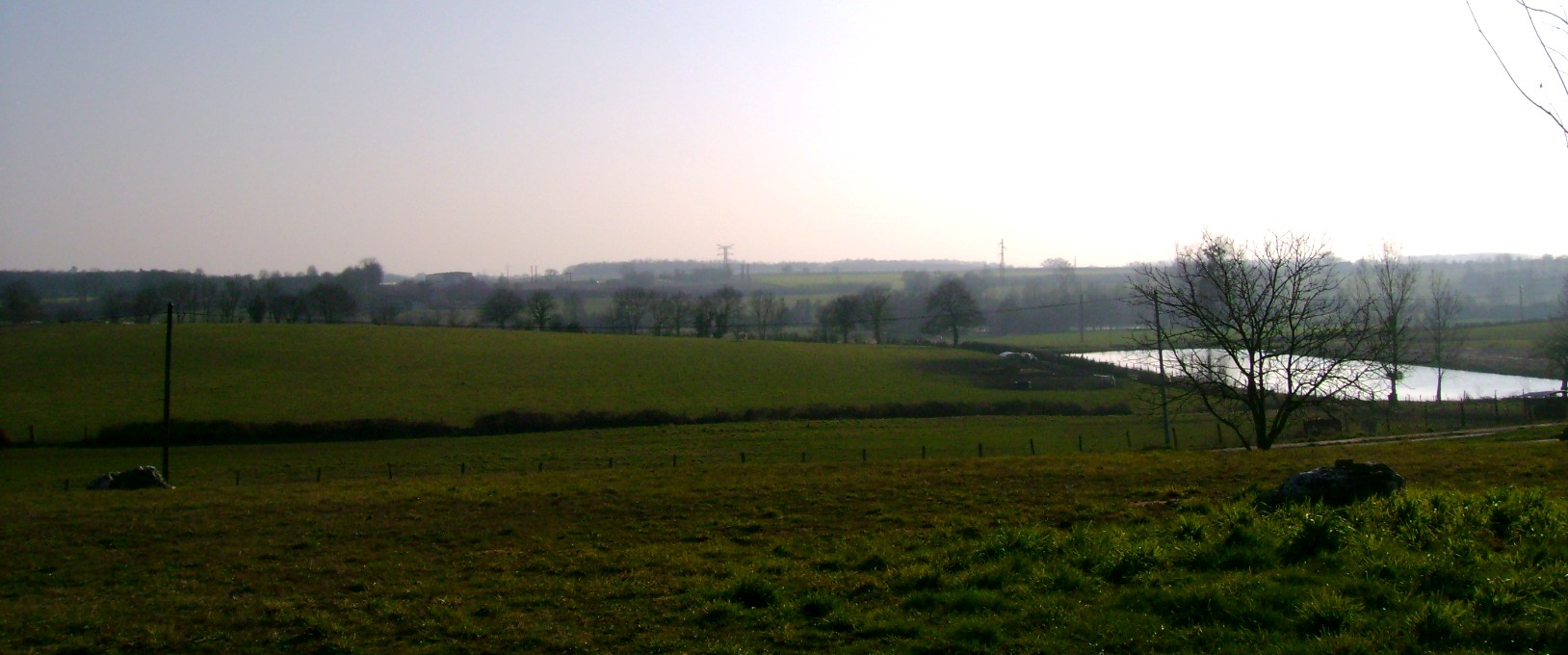
- The landscape around Candé, in Vritz commune

- Coat of arms
- Location of Vritz
- Location within France Location within Pays de la Loire
- Coordinates: 47°34′57″N 1°04′07″W
- Country: France
- Region: Pays de la Loire
- Department: Loire-Atlantique
- Arrondissement: Châteaubriant-Ancenis
- Canton: Ancenis-Saint-Géréon
- Commune: Vallons-de-l'Erdre
- Area^{1}: 32.89 km^{2} (12.70 sq mi)
- Highest elevation: 92 m (302 ft)
- Lowest elevation: 35 m (115 ft)
- Population (2022): 706
  - Density: 21.5/km^{2} (55.6/sq mi)
- Demonym(s): Vritziens, Vritziennes
- Time zone: UTC+01:00 (CET)
  - Summer (DST): UTC+02:00 (CEST)
- Postal code: 44540
- Website: http://www.pays-ancenis.fr/
- ^{1} French Land Register data, which excludes lakes, ponds, glaciers > 1 km^{2} (0.386 sq mi or 247 acres) and river estuaries.

Vritz (French pronunciation: [vri]; Breton: Gwerid) is a former commune in the Loire-Atlantique department in western France. On 1 January 2018, it was merged into the new commune of Vallons-de-l'Erdre.

== See also ==
- Communes of the Loire-Atlantique department
