= Intersection (novel) =

1967 novel by Paul Guimard

- Author: Paul Guimard
- Original title: Les Choses de la vie
- Translator: Shaun Whiteside
- Language: French
- Publisher: Éditions Denoël
- Publication date: 1967
- Publication place: France
- English publication date: 1994
- Pages: 167

Intersection is a 1967 novel by the French writer Paul Guimard. Its French title is Les Choses de la vie, which means "the things of life". It tells the story of a lawyer who has a serious car accident and lies in bed at a hospital, where he is unable to communicate but hears the people around him, as he remembers his life up until the accident. The book was published in English in 1994, translated by Shaun Whiteside. It received the Prix des libraires in 1968.

== Adaptations ==
The novel was the basis for Claude Sautet's 1970 film The Things of Life, starring Romy Schneider and Michel Piccoli. Sautet's film was remade in the United States as Intersection, released in 1994.
