= Bonnœuvre =

- Part of Vallons-de-l'Erdre
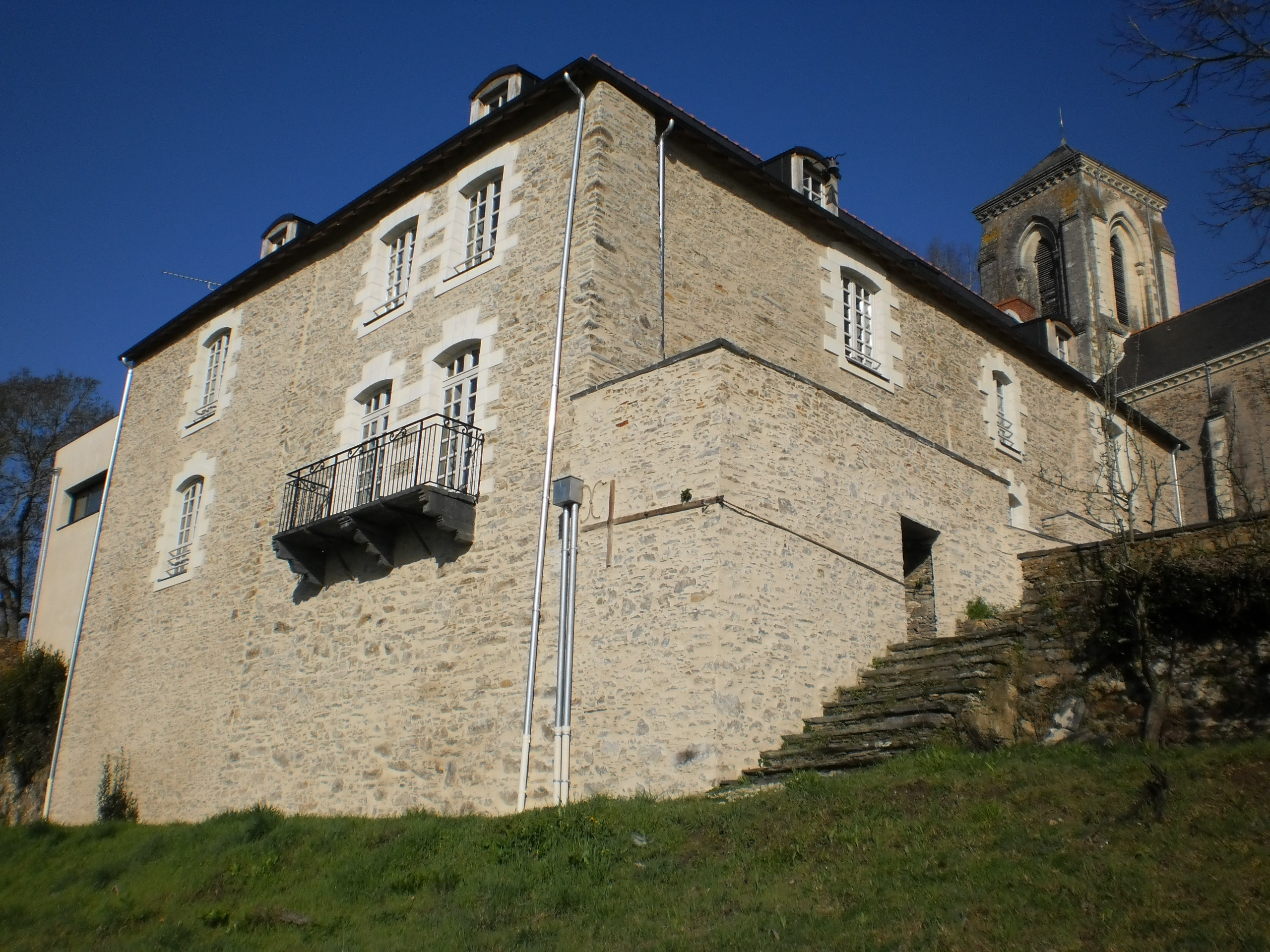
- The former priory in Bonnœuvr

- Coat of arms
- Location of Bonnœuvre
- Location within France Location within Pays de la Loire
- Coordinates: 47°31′42″N 1°14′05″W
- Country: France
- Region: Pays de la Loire
- Department: Loire-Atlantique
- Arrondissement: Châteaubriant-Ancenis
- Canton: Ancenis-Saint-Géréon
- Commune: Vallons-de-l'Erdre
- Area^{1}: 15.66 km^{2} (6.05 sq mi)
- Highest elevation: 78 m (256 ft)
- Lowest elevation: 22 m (72 ft)
- Population (2023): 552
  - Density: 35.2/km^{2} (91.3/sq mi)
- Time zone: UTC+01:00 (CET)
  - Summer (DST): UTC+02:00 (CEST)
- Postal code: 44540
- ^{1} French Land Register data, which excludes lakes, ponds, glaciers > 1 km^{2} (0.386 sq mi or 247 acres) and river estuaries.

Bonnœuvre (French pronunciation: [bɔnœvʁ]; Breton: Banvre) is a former commune in the Loire-Atlantique department in western France. On 1 January 2018, it was merged into the new commune of Vallons-de-l'Erdre.

== See also ==
- Communes of the Loire-Atlantique department
