= Saint-Sulpice-des-Landes, Loire-Atlantique =

Saint-Sulpice-des-Landes
- Part of Vallons-de-l'Erdre
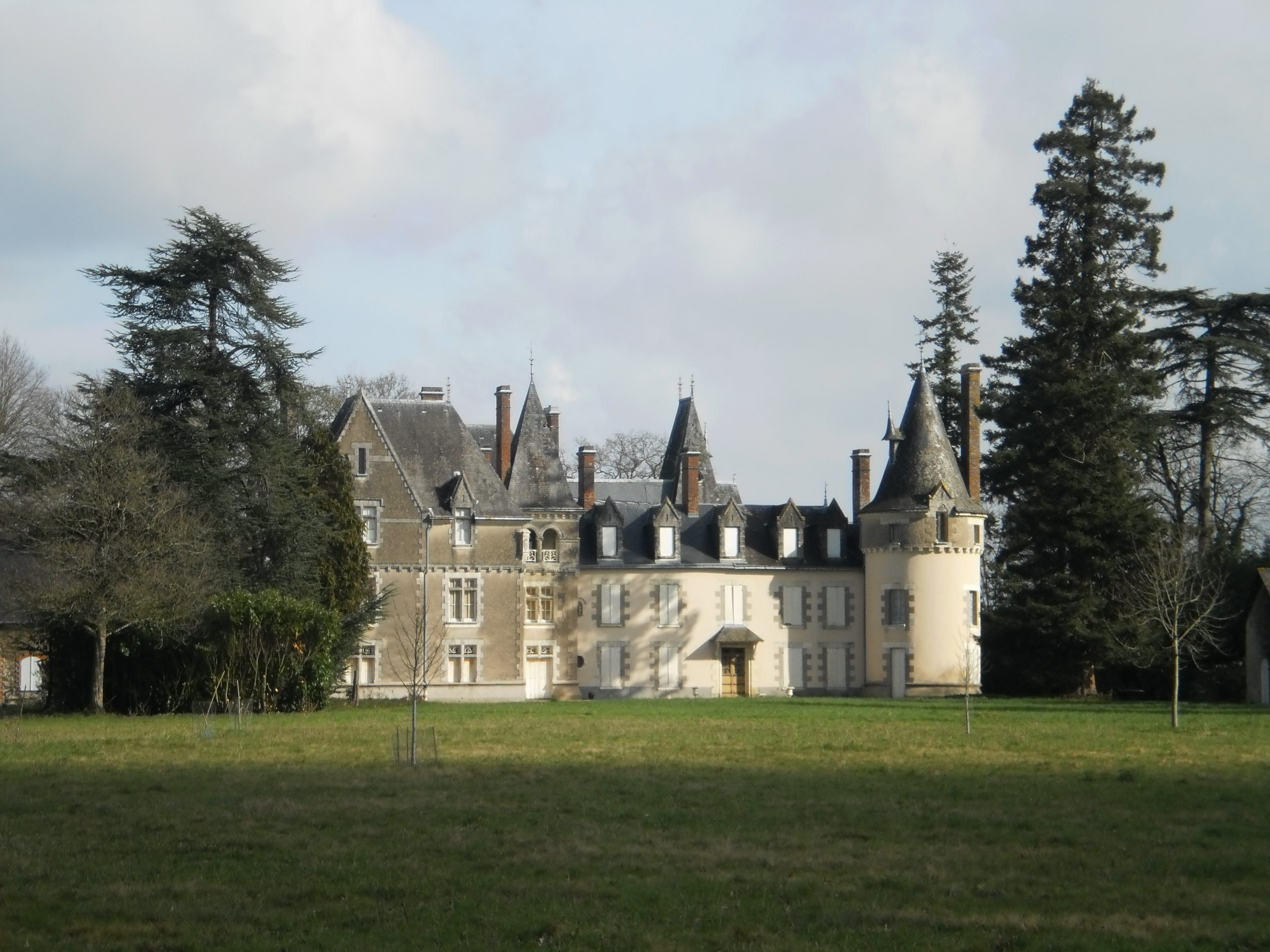
- The château du Courdray, in Saint-Sulpice-des-Landes

- Coat of arms
- Location of Saint-Sulpice-des-Landes
- Location within France Location within Pays de la Loire
- Coordinates: 47°34′32″N 1°12′17″W
- Country: France
- Region: Pays de la Loire
- Department: Loire-Atlantique
- Arrondissement: Châteaubriant-Ancenis
- Canton: Ancenis-Saint-Géréon
- Commune: Vallons-de-l'Erdre
- Area^{1}: 30.78 km^{2} (11.88 sq mi)
- Elevation: 71 m (233 ft)
- Highest elevation: 86 m (282 ft)
- Lowest elevation: 44 m (144 ft)
- Population (2022): 679
  - Density: 22.1/km^{2} (57.1/sq mi)
- Time zone: UTC+01:00 (CET)
  - Summer (DST): UTC+02:00 (CEST)
- Postal code: 44540
- ^{1} French Land Register data, which excludes lakes, ponds, glaciers > 1 km^{2} (0.386 sq mi or 247 acres) and river estuaries.

Saint-Sulpice-des-Landes (French pronunciation: [sɛ̃ sylpis de lɑ̃d]; Breton: Sant-Suleg-al-Lanneier) is a former commune in the Loire-Atlantique department in western France. On 1 January 2018, it was merged into the new commune of Vallons-de-l'Erdre.

== See also ==
- Communes of the Loire-Atlantique department
