= Rapido (TV series) =

- De Caunes presented and linked reports in front of the minimalist white lettered background seen here
- Developed by: NBdC
- Countries of origin: United Kingdom, France

Production
- Running time: 22 minutes

Original release
- Network: BBC1, BBC2 (United Kingdom); Canal+ (France)
- Release: 3 November 1988 (BBC version) – 25 March 1992 (BBC version)

Rapido was a British-French music programme presented by Antoine de Caunes in 1987. After the BBC’s head of youth and entertainment Janet Street-Porter saw the programme, she decided to commission an English-language version with de Caunes, which would become part of her DEF II programming block on BBC2. The English-language version of Rapido ran from 1988 to 1992, with the show usually debuting new episodes on a Wednesday night in DEF II's early evening slot, though episodes from the first series were initially scheduled after Question Time's Thursday night episode on BBC1 from November 1988.

The show which would feature reports from up-and-coming new bands, European acts (like Françoise Hardy, and Violent Eves) and established acts like Robert Plant, Jeff Beck, the Grateful Dead, John Lee Hooker and Randy Newman. These reports would be narrated in the BBC version by Lisa I'Anson, linked together with footage of De Caunes standing in front of a large Rapido sign on a white background. These parts were directed in France by Bernard Faroux, while the main titles for this Anglo-French TV music show were designed by French fashion photographer and music video director Jean-Baptiste Mondino. The last BBC edition was broadcast on 25 March 1992 as part of DEF II and featured reports on The Cure, Annie Lennox, The Verve, The Disposable Heroes of Hiphoprisy and Rosie the Raving Granny.

Rapido ran in over 14 countries worldwide. It gave the name to the production company Rapido TV (later Planet Rapido), which created the late night Channel 4 television show Eurotrash (which ran from 1993 to 2004) and a 1994 TV special presented by Ice-T called Kiss My Baadasssss - Ice-T's Guide To Blaxploitation.

Rapido was notable for De Caunes' idiosyncratic delivery. His English is completely fluent, but he (deliberately) spoke it with French intonations and speech rhythms on the programme.
