= Aimé Picquet du Boisguy =

French chouan (1776–1839)

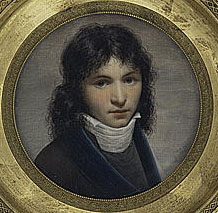
- Born: 1 March 1776; Fougères, Kingdom of France
- Died: August 25, 1839 (aged 63); Paris, Kingdom of France
- Relatives: Brothers: Louis Picquet du Boisguy; Guy Picquet du Boisguy; Uncle: Toussaint-Guillaume Picquet de la Motte; Brother-in-law: Toussaint du Breil de Pontbriand
- Military career
- Allegiance: Kingdom of France; Breton Association
- Branch: Cavalry and infantry
- Service years: 1791–1800; 1816–1830
- Rank: Maréchal de camp
- Nickname: Le petit général
- Commands: Armée royale de Rennes et de Fougères
- Conflicts: Chouannerie; War in the Vendée: Virée de Galerne; Battle of Entrames; Battle of Fougères; Siege of Granville; Siege of Angers; Battle of Le Mans; Battle of Argentré; First Battle of Saint-James; Battle of Le Rocher de La Piochais; Battle of Saint-Hilaire-des-Landes; Battle of Valennes; Battle of Maisonneuve; Second Battle of Saint-James; Battle of the Tombettes
- Awards: Order of Saint Louis; Commander of the Légion d'honneur

Aimé Casimir Marie Picquet, chevalier du Boisguy, sometimes spelt Bois-Guy, (15 March 1776 – 25 October 1839), was a Breton chouan general during the French Revolution. He was nicknamed "the little general" by his men due to his youth. Still a child at the outbreak of the Revolution, he signalled his precocity to fight on the Royalist side, joining the Breton Association at 15 and becoming aide de camp to La Rouërie. At 17 he was made leader of the chouannerie in the pays de Fougères, and a general at 19. Boisguy made the north-east of the Ille-et-Vilaine one of the most active areas of the Breton chouannerie, and showed himself an excellent tactician. Rarely beaten, the chouans there were among the best organised and best disciplined. Fighting in uniform from the end of 1795 and made up of elite troops, even so they suffered from a lack of cavalry and a near-total lack of artillery. The Republicans had to raise major forces to defeat them, and then only with difficulty. In both 1796 and 1800, Boisguy was the last general to surrender, making him one of the main figures of the chouannerie.
