= Antoine de Caunes =

French film director and actor (born 1953)

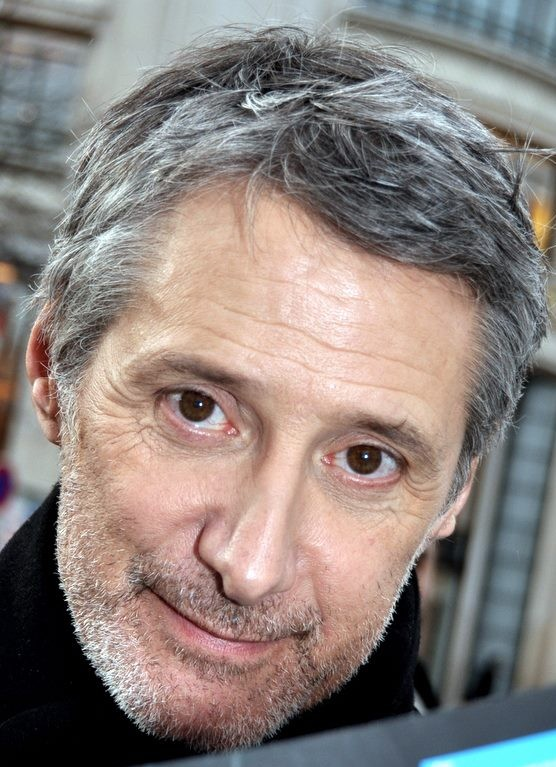
- Antoine de Caunes at 2013 César Awards
- Born: 1 December 1953 (age 72); Paris, France
- Occupations: Television presenter; actor; director; comedian; journalist
- Spouse: Daphné Roulier (m. 2007)
- Children: 3, including Emma de Caunes
- Parent(s): Georges de Caunes; Jacqueline Joubert

Antoine de Caunes (French: [ɑ̃twan də kon]; born 1 December 1953) is a French television presenter, comedian, actor, journalist, writer and film director. He is the son of two prominent French personalities, television journalist-reporter Georges de Caunes and television announcer Jacqueline Joubert. He is the father of the actress Emma de Caunes.

== Career ==
He began his career writing theme songs for cartoons for Antenne 2 under the pseudonym of Paul Persavon, including Cobra and Space Sheriff Gavan (known in France as X-Or).

His early TV appearances included Chorus (1975), the series Les Enfants du rock, again for A2, and then his breakthrough with Nulle part ailleurs for Canal+.

In 1988, De Caunes started making an English-language version of his French music programme Rapido, for Janet Street-Porter's youth and entertainment programming strand DEF II, with new episodes of Rapido usually being broadcast as part of DEF II's Wednesday night schedule on BBC2. He then went on to create the long-running magazine programme Eurotrash for Channel 4, a humorous post-pub entertainment show which he co-presented with Jean Paul Gaultier from 1993 to 1996. It featured regular spots for European stars like Lolo Ferrari. He also presented a short-lived chat show on Channel 4 called Le Show. In addition, he appeared in an advertising campaign for Rowntree's Fruit Pastilles ice lollies.

From 2013 until 2015, he hosted the daily evening show Le Grand Journal on Canal+.

He provided voices in the Aardman Animation TV show Rex the Runt.

De Caunes launched a new magazine Vieux, about issues faced by the elderly, in May 2024.

He is a long-time AIDS awareness campaigner, fronting the organisation Solidarité sida (AIDS Solidarity).

== Filmography ==
=== Film acting ===
- 1989: Pentimento – Charles
- 1996: Les Deux papas et la Maman – Jérôme
- 1997: C'est pour la bonne cause – Antoine
- 1997: La Divine Poursuite – Alex
- 1998: L'homme est une femme comme les autres – Simon Eskenazy
- 1999: Au cœur du mensonge – Germain-Roland Desmot
- 1999: Chili con carne – Claude
- 2000: Là-bas... mon pays – Pierre Nivel
- 2001: Le Vélo de Ghislain Lambert – The narrator
- 2002: Blanche – The captain of the KKK
- 2002: Les Clefs de bagnole – an actor refusing to play in a Baffie film
- 2006: Un ami parfait – Julien Rossi
- 2007: Mr. Bean's Holiday – Television presenter
- 2008: Tu peux garder un secret? – Julien
- 2008: 48 heures par jour – Bruno
- 2009: La Folle histoire d'amour de Simon Eskenazy – Simon Eskenazy
- 2010: Mumu – The Colonel
- 2021: Kaamelott: The First Chapter – Dagonet

=== Television acting ===
- 1987: Objectif: Nul – Igor and Grichka Bogdanoff
- 1988-1992: Rapido – series presenter
- 1993–2007: Eurotrash – series presenter
- 1998: Bob le magnifique (made-for-television movie) by Marc Angelo – François Morin / Bob Saint Clar
- 2002: Les Amants du bagne (made-for-television movie) by Thierry Binisti – Albert Londres
- 2006-2008: Kaamelott (television series) – Dagonet
- 2007: Off Prime (television series, season 1, episode 2) – as himself
- 2010: Du hard ou du cochon! (television series, episode 3) – Fluck
- 2012: Bref (television series, episode 53) by Kyan Khojandi et Bruno Muschio – as himself
- 2013: L'homme à la tête de kraft (short film) by Thierry Dupety and Sandra Joubeaud
- 2013: Dangereuses retrouvailles (made-for-television movie) by Jérôme Debusschère – Paul Aubras
- 2013: Hitchcock by Mocky, episode: "Le don d'Iris"

=== Directing ===
- 1997: T'en as ?
- 2001: Les Morsures de l'aube aka Love Bites
- 2002: Monsieur N.
- 2006: Désaccord parfait
- 2008: Coluche, l'histoire d'un mec
- 2011: Yann Piat, chronique d'un assassinat (made-for-television movie)

=== Voice work ===
- 1999: Stuart Little by Rob Minkoff – Stuart Little (French language version)
- 2001: La Route d'Eldorado by Don Paul and Eric Bergeron – Miguel
- 2001: Le Vélo De Ghislain Lambert by Philippe Harel – The Narrator
- 2001-2002: The New Adventures of Lucky Luke (series) – Lucky Luke
- 2002: Stuart Little 2 by Rob Minkoff – Stuart Little
- 2004: Voyage autour du soleil (made-for-television movie), docu-fiction on the space conquest
- 2007: La France made in USA (made-for-television movie) – The Narrator
- 2011: Illegal Love by Julie Gali, documentaire – Mark Leno
- 2012: Cendrillon au Far West by Pascal Hérold – The Prince

== Discography ==
Two CD titles, Il a pas peur de personne, Film Music by BO from the animated show Lucky Luke televised on France 3 and sold in 2001 by Sony Music.

Songwriter

- 1983: Tchaou et Grodo
- 1984: Au pays des quat'z'amis
- 1984: Y'en a qui (Marie Dauphin)
- 1984: X-Or
- 1985: Clémentine
- 1985: Cobra
- 1985: L'Empire des Cinq
- 1986: Lady Oscar
- 1986: L'Île au trésor

=== Participation ===
- 2009 - On n'est pas là pour se faire engueuler !, album in homage to Boris Vian. Cantate des boîtes

== Bibliography ==
Antoine de Caunes wrote his first book published with Éditions Albin Michel in the collection Rock & Folk in the Magma groupe:

- Magma, 187p., 1978. ISBN 978-2226005632

He wrote two novels about the conquests of the New York private detective, Sam Murchinson:

- C'est bon, mais c'est chaud (1990)
- C'est beau mais c'est triste (1998)

Several collections of his speeches Nulle part ailleurs were published; texts written with Albert Algoud:

- Vous permettez que je vous appelle Raymond ?, 1990.
- Pas mal pour un lundi, 1990.
- J'aime beaucoup ce que vous faites, 1991
- Une ambulance peut en cacher une autre, 1992.
- Bien entendu, je plaisante, 1993. ISBN 2226063293
- Le Petit Gildas illustré, 1993. ISBN 2226063811

He also wrote a dictionary:

- Dictionnaire Amoureux du Rock, Plon, 2010 ISBN 978-2259205757

== Radio shows ==
- Popopop, since August 2017, every weekday at 3pm UK time, on France Inter, National French radio station.
