= Eurotrash (TV series) =

British television series on Channel 4

- Created by: Peter Stuart
- Presented by: Antoine de Caunes; Jean-Paul Gaultier (1993–1996); Guest presenters
- Starring: Victoria Silvstedt; Eddy Wally; Graham Norton (series 9); Carla Bruni; Melinda Messenger (1997–1998)
- Voices of: Davina McCall (series 1); Kate Robbins; Johnny Daukes
- Narrated by: Maria McErlane
- Opening theme: "Saint Tropez" by Brigitte Bardot
- Country of origin: United Kingdom
- Original language: English
- No. of series: 16
- No. of episodes: 134, plus 11 specials (Original run)

Production
- Running time: 30–60 minutes
- Production company: Rapido Television

Original release
- Network: Channel 4
- Release: 24 September 1993 – 2004
- Release: 17 June 2016

Related
- Rapido; Baadasss TV; Passengers

Eurotrash is a British-French late-night programme that was broadcast by Channel 4. Originally presented by Antoine de Caunes and Jean Paul Gaultier, it was a comedic, magazine-style review of arts, entertainment, and culture from continental Europe, often with a focus on local celebrities, and other unusual and/or sexually provocative topics.

Eurotrash ran for 16 series on Channel 4 from 1993 to 2004, along with eleven specials. In 2016, Channel 4 aired a one-off Brexit-themed revival, with de Caunes and Gaultier returning as presenters.

== History ==
After Rapido concluded its run on BBC2's youth strand DEF II, presenter Antoine de Caunes and producer Peter Stuart began to work on a pitch for a weekly magazine show—which de Caunes described as an effort to "reconcile Brits with the rest of Europe." Jean Paul Gaultier—a friend of de Caunes—was brought on to serve as its initial co-presenter, while actress Maria McErlane provided comedic narration; she described Eurotrash as "a way of getting risque material on air with a cheeky postcard giggle".

Gaultier left at the end of series 6 and de Caunes then co-presented with a range of guest presenters for the remainder of the run.

In June 2016, Eurotrash aired a one-off, Brexit-themed special, with de Caunes and Gaultier returning as presenters. Channel 4 promoted the special as demonstrating how the UK would be "just a very sad and insignificant little island with bad food and terrible teeth" without Europe.

== Format ==
Each episode usually consisted of six or seven stories, such as interviews with entertainers, and profiles of weird or sexually provocative topics (including pornography and kinks). The programme had a kitschy, seemingly low-budget look, with the presenters often making comments mocking the United Kingdom as being insignificant in comparison to the rest of Europe.

A number of features and stars survived from series one, including Pipi and Popo, two cardboard giraffes made from toilet paper tubes, and the Belgian singer Eddy Wally. Victoria Silvstedt was a semi-regular during 2003, often appearing in the studio with de Caunes to present the recurring "Naked Germans of the Week" segment. Graham Norton featured as a roving reporter in series 9, Carla Bruni also appeared.

Narrative commentary was voiced by Maria McErlane. Davina McCall provided English voice translations in series 1. In later years Kate Robbins provided voice-over translation for the strange continental "stars", which she performed in exaggerated Yorkshire and other British regional accents and similar quirky anglicised effects. Johnny Daukes, former singer and writer with the indie band FIN in the 1990s, provided male voices in a similar fashion throughout the series.

== Episodes ==
=== UK series ===
Series	Start date	End date	Episodes
1	24 September 1993	29 October 1993	6
2	28 April 1994	13 May 1994	6
3	14 October 1994	18 November 1994	6
4	12 May 1995	16 June 1995	6
5	17 November 1995	29 December 1995	7
6	12 April 1996	17 May 1996	6
7	13 September 1996	18 October 1996	6
8	9 May 1997	27 June 1997	8
9	9 January 1998	20 February 1998	8
10	25 September 1998	18 December 1998	8
11	8 January 1999	1999	9
12	24 September 1999	24 May 2000	17
13	7 July 2000	7 September 2000	10
14	29 March 2001	7 June 2001	10
15	8 August 2002	December 2002	9
16	12 August 2004	December 2004	12

=== Specials ===
Title	Air date
Christmas Special(s)	24 December 1994
Christmas Special(s)	22 December 1995
Christmas Special(s)	24 December 1997
Christmas Special(s)	December 1999
A Song for Eurotrash	12 May 1998
Euroballs '98	16 June 1998
Eurotrash - New Year Special	31 December 1998
Eurotrash's Big Bang	31 December 1999
Eurotrash - Olympic Special	22 September 2000
Euroballs 2000	2000
Unzipped	19 November 2001
Eurotrash EU Referendum Special	17 June 2016

=== A Song for Eurotrash ===
A Song for Eurotrash was a spin-off of Eurotrash broadcast for the first time on 12 May 1998. It was accompanied by an album with the same title containing mostly covers of successful songs to mark the Eurovision Song Contest 1998 being held in the UK, plus a title track "A Song for Eurotrash" written for the programme:

Track listing

1. Brigitte Bardot – "Saint Tropez" (written by Francis Lai) (1:13)
2. Kenickie – "Save Your Kisses for Me" (written by Martin Lee, original by Brotherhood of Man) (3:22)
3. Dubstar feat. Sacha Distel – "Poupée de cire, poupée de son" (written by Serge Gainsbourg, original by France Gall) 3:10)
4. Edwyn Collins – "Ding-a-dong" (original by Teach-In) (2:38)
5. Saint Etienne – "La, la, la" (written by Ramón Arcusa, original by Massiel) (3:18)
6. Dean Martin – "Volare" (written by Franco Migliacci, Domenico Modugno, Mitchell Parish, originally by Domenico Modugno) (2:59)
7. Terry Hall and Sinéad O'Connor – "All Kinds of Everything" (written by Derry Lindsay, Jackie Ward Smith - original by Dana) (2:43)
8. Shane MacGowan and The Popes – "What's Another Year" (written by Shay Healy, original by Johnny Logan) (4:01)
9. Éva Henger – "Ooh Yeah" (written by Shaun Imrei / Peter Stuart) (03:22)
10. Fox Force 5 – "A-Ba-Ni-Bi" (written by Nurit Hirsh and Ehud Manor, originally by Izhar Cohen and Alphabeta) (02:58)
11. Annie Christian – "Congratulations" (written by Phil Coulter / Bill Martin, original by Cliff Richard (4:02)
12. Bananarama – "Waterloo" (written by Stig Anderson / Benny Andersson / Björn Ulvaeus, original by ABBA) (3:04)
13. 808 State – Variations on "Te Deum" (Eurovision Theme) (5:00)
14. Kate Robbins – "A Song for Eurotrash" (written by Peter Stuart) (3:37)

== See also ==
- Baadasss TV – British television series
