= Vallons-de-l'Erdre =

Vallons-de-l'Erdre Saonioù-an-Erzh (Breton)
- Commune
- Location of Vallons-de-l'Erdre
- Location within France Location within Pays de la Loire
- Coordinates: 47°31′34″N 1°11′01″W
- Country: France
- Region: Pays de la Loire
- Department: Loire-Atlantique
- Arrondissement: Châteaubriant-Ancenis
- Canton: Ancenis-Saint-Géréon
- Intercommunality: Pays d'Ancenis

Government
  - Mayor (2020–2026): Jean-Yves Ploteau
- Area^{1}: 189.21 km^{2} (73.05 sq mi)
- Population (2023): 6,692
  - Density: 35.37/km^{2} (91.60/sq mi)
- Time zone: UTC+01:00 (CET)
  - Summer (DST): UTC+02:00 (CEST)
- INSEE/Postal code: 44180 /44540
- ^{1} French Land Register data, which excludes lakes, ponds, glaciers > 1 km^{2} (0.386 sq mi or 247 acres) and river estuaries.

Vallons-de-l'Erdre (French pronunciation: [valɔ̃ də lɛʁdʁ]; Breton: Saonioù-an-Erzh) is a commune in the department of Loire-Atlantique, western France. The municipality was established on 1 January 2018 by merger of the former communes of Saint-Mars-la-Jaille (the seat), Bonnœuvre, Freigné (part of the department of Maine-et-Loire before 2018), Maumusson, Saint-Sulpice-des-Landes and Vritz.

== Population ==
Population data refer to the commune in its geography as of January 2025.

Historical population
Year	Pop.	±% p.a.
1968	6,444	—
1975	6,129	−0.71%
1982	6,100	−0.07%
1990	5,905	−0.41%
1999	5,900	−0.01%
2007	6,431	+1.08%
2012	6,581	+0.46%
2017	6,556	−0.08%
2023	6,692	+0.34%
Source: INSEE

== See also ==
- Communes of the Loire-Atlantique department
