= Paul Guimard =

French writer

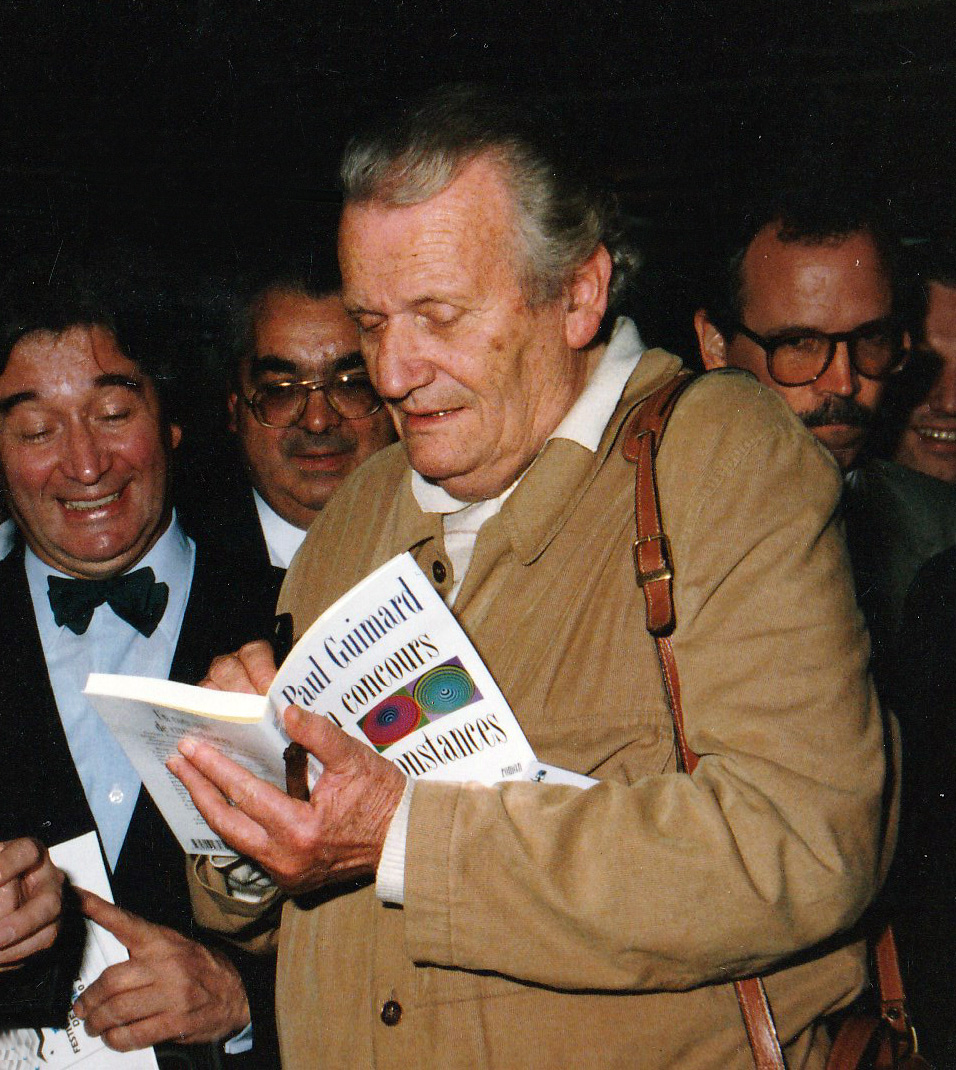
- Paul Guimard signing at the International Festival of Geography
- Born: 3 March 1921; Saint-Mars-la-Jaille, Loire-Atlantique, France
- Died: 2 May 2004 (aged 83); Hyères, Var, France
- Occupation: Writer
- Spouse: Benoîte Groult
- Children: 1

Paul Guimard (3 March 1921 – 2 May 2004) was a French writer known for combining his passion for writing with his love of the sea. His most famous work was Les Choses de la Vie, which was adapted for film, with a complete change of its ending, by Claude Sautet, with Romy Schneider and Michel Piccoli.

== Biography ==
Guimard was born at Saint-Mars-la-Jaille (Loire-Atlantique). He married Benoîte Groult. Following a poor performance at the private Saint-Stanislas school of Nantes, he began a career as a journalist. During World War II he reported for the provincial paper L'Echo de la Loire and later had a job as a news editor for another regional daily, L'Ouest-Eclair. He covered French broadcasting in the op-ed pages of Tribune de Paris for four years.

In 1945 he wrote a comedy, Seventh Sky, which played briefly. His literary career began in 1956 with the successful, award-winning novel False Friends. His next award winner, Rue du Havre, followed a year later.

In 1960 Guimard wrote the comedy A Best Man with his friend Antoine Blondin in Paris. One year later, he published The Irony of Fate which, like Rue du Havre, explores the role of chance in human relationships. The book was the basis for a film by Edouard Molinaro.

== Later years ==
Guimard was in charge of a mission for the French President François Mitterrand from Mitterrand's election in 1981 until August 1982. "My only regret is not to have obtained at the time of my passage to the Elysium the creation of an academy of the Sea", Guimard said, affirming that this experiment "was not directed, but only one long accident".

Guimard was a member of the audio-visual communication authority from 1982 to 1986. He then returned to literature after a decade. He published a short story on Giraudoux, Giraudoux? Hello!... (1988) and novels such as A Combination of Circumstances (1990), The Stone Age (1992), and First Comers (1997).

In 1993 he received a lifetime achievement award from the Foundation of Prince Pierre of Monaco.

Paul Guimard died in Hyères (Var). He was married to French feminist and optimistic writer Benoîte Groult, who shared his love of navigation. The style of both writers slightly converged in that respect; Groult's latest works (Les Vaisseaux du coeur) are more nostalgic, and Guimard's "brother" novel, also about human destiny and sea (Le Mauvais temps), is more sensible to the role of human will as opposed to fate.

== Works ==
Most of Guimard's novels deal about the role of randomness in life (mainly L'Ironie du sort), time, man's understanding of hidden and ironic structures in which he is trapped. His latest work (Le Mauvais temps) describes a major transformation of a character who finally understands in dramatic circumstances the price of life and the importance of personal choice, changing his desperate life for the best.

- Les Premiers venus (First Comers)
- Les Choses de la vie (Life As It Is), published in English as Intersection (1994)
- Les Faux-frères (Traitors)
- Rue du Havre (Le Havre Street) – adapted as a telefilm for French TV; published in the U.S. as The House of Happiness
- L'Ironie du sort (Fate's Ironies) – adapted as a film
- L'Age de pierre (The Stone Age)
- Giraudoux ? Tiens ! (Giraudoux? Hello!)
- Le Mauvais temps (Bad Weather)
