= Armée des Émigrés =

French royalist counter-revolutionary armies

Army of the Émigrés
- Armée des Émigrés
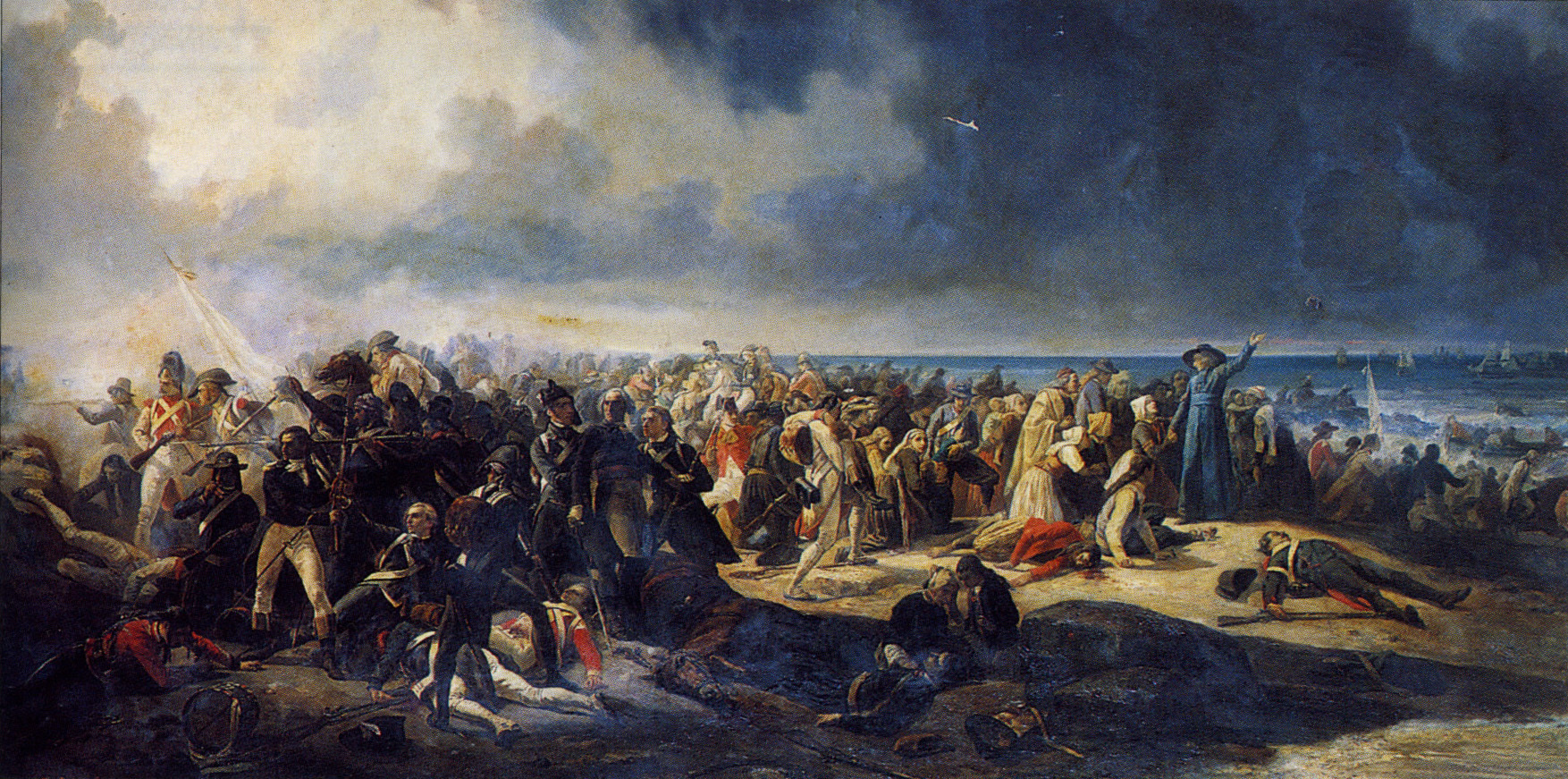
- Armée des Émigrés during the invasion of France in 1795
- Leader: Louis Joseph, Prince of Condé
- Dates active: 1792–1814
- Allegiance: Kingdom of France: House of Bourbon
- Ideology: Monarchism
- Size: 20,000 men
- Wars: French Revolutionary and Napoleonic Wars

The Armée des Émigrés (English: Army of the Émigrés) were counter-revolutionary armies raised by French royalist émigrés with the aim of overthrowing the French First Republic and restoring the Kingdom of France. These were aided by royalist forces within France, such as the Chouans, and by allied countries such as Great Britain and Spain. They fought in numerous engagements during the French Revolutionary Wars, but were ultimately unable to challenge the French Revolutionary Army, though they their goal of the Bourbon Restoration in France was realized by Napoleon's downfall.

They were formed from:

- Volunteers from the French nobility, descendants of the royal family, and other refugees who had fled France
- Troops raised by the refugees through covert subsidies from other European monarchies, or through their own means
- Units of the French Royal Army which had also emigrated, such as the Saxe Hussar Regiment and the Irish Brigade

In 1802, First Consul Napoleon Bonaparte decreed a general amnesty for all remaining French émigrés, though he excluded approximately 1,000 people who had served as officers in the Armée des Émigrés or European armies at war with the French Republic. Napoleon once said of the Armée des Émigrés that "True, they are paid by our enemies, but they were or should have been bound to the cause of their King. France gave death to their action, and tears to their courage. All devotion is heroic".

== Main units ==
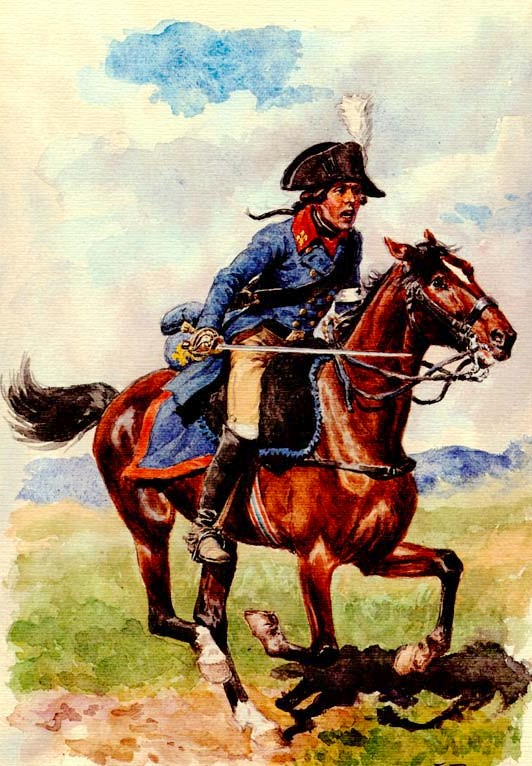
Royalist cavalryman of the Armée des Émigrés

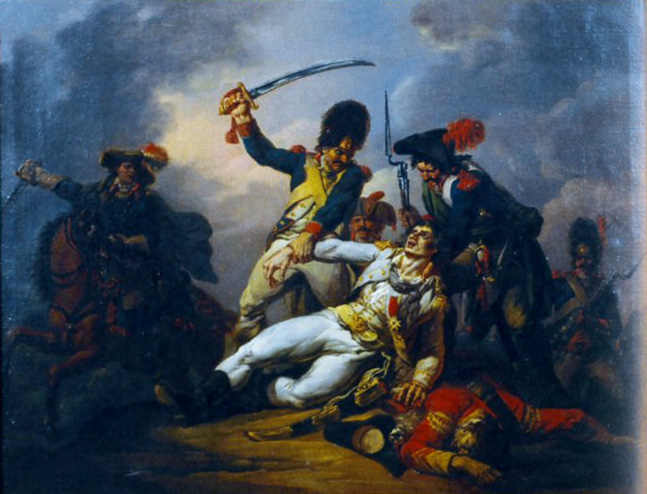
The capture of François de Charette in 1796

=== Armée de Condé ===
- Régiment de Mortemart

=== Armée des Princes ===
Raised in Germany in 1792, at Trier, and commanded by marshals de Broglie and de Castries, under the aegis of Louis XVI's brothers, the Count of Provence and Count of Artois. 10,000 strong, it returned to France beside the army of Duke of Brunswick and was dismissed on 24 November 1792, two months after the French victory at Valmy.

=== Armée de Bourbon ===
The short-lived Armée de Bourbon was formed by French Émigrés in Madrid and Seville, forming a small standing force of 2000 men, briefly participating in the War of the Pyrenees. Remnants of the force remained in the Spanish Royal Army as the Bourbon Regiment and other legionary formations until well after 1815, when King Louis XVIII, after the Second Defeat of Napoleon Bonaparte, recalled them from Spanish service.

== Other units ==
=== Légion des Pyrénées ===
- Creation: 1794
- Also known as: Légion royale des Pyrénées in May
- Founder: Marquis de Saint-Simon
- Commander: Marquis de Saint-Simon
- Size: 600 infantrymen and a squadron of hussars
- Theatre of operations: Pyrénées-Atlantiques
- Engagements: Saint-Étienne-de-Baïgorry (26 April 1794), heavy losses (17 prisoners guillotined); montagnes d’Arquinzun (10 July), heavy losses (30 to 50% of its effective strength); Port-Bidassoa (24 July), heavy losses covering the Spanish retreat (50 captured); Siege of Pamplona (November).
- Operated within the Spanish army of Navarre
- Sent to the front in 1795, then integrated into the Régiment de Bourbon

=== Légion de Panetier ===
- Creation: 1793
- Also known as: Légion de la Reine (d'Espagne) in June 1794
- Founder: Comte de Panetier (died January 1794)
- Commander: Comte de Panetier, then Général de Santa-Clara
- Size: 400; brought up to strength in June 1794 by the companies du Royal-Provence escaping from the Siege of Toulon and the companies du Royal Roussillon
- Theatre of operations: Pyrénées-Orientales
- Engagements: Defence of Port-Vendres (May 1794), evacuated by sea (to avoid being captured and guillotined); Zamora 5 January 1796
- Operating within the Spanish army
- Amalgamated into the Régiment de Bourbon

=== Légion du Vallespir ===
- Creation: 1793
- Also known as: Bataillon de la frontière circa May 1793
- Founder: Spanish general Ricardos, Spanish soldiers under Émigré officers
- Commander:
- Size:
- Theatre of operations: Defence of Vallespir, then defending Roussillon
- Engagements:
- Operating within the Spanish army
- Several desertions to the légion de Panetier - Amalgamated into the Régiment de Bourbon

=== Royal Roussillon ===
- Creation: January 1794 at Barcelona from émigrés, prisoners and deserters
- Also known as:
- Founder: Général Ricardos
- Commander:
- Size: 200 in June of 1794 (of which 129 were massacred by a mob since they were amusing themselves in their barracks on a procession day)
- Theatre of operations:
- Engagements: None
- Subsumed into the Légion de Panetier (becoming the Légion de la Reine at that moment)

=== Régiment de Bourbon ===
- Creation: 1796 from the Légion de la Reine (ex-Légion de Panetier), the Bataillon de la frontière, and the Légion royale des Pyrénées
- Also known as: Integrated into the Spanish army as number 47, then 37
- Founder: Marquis de Saint-Simon
- Commander : Marquis de Saint-Simon
- Size: 1600 (1808)
- Theatre of operations: garrisoning Ciudad Rodrigo (1797) then Mallorca
- Engagements: Siege of Girona (fell 9 December 1808, 300 captured); Rozas (1808)
- Operating within the Spanish army
- Still in existence in 1814; formed of foreign soldiers and Gardes Wallonnes, under number 41, then in 1860 became Spain's "53rd infantry regiment", known as El Emigrado.

== See also ==
- Catholic and Royal Army
- Chouan Army of Rennes and Fougères
- Chouannerie
- War in the Vendée
