= Benoîte Groult =

French writer and activist (1920-2016)

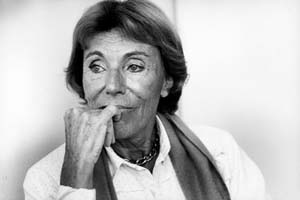
- Born: 31 January 1920; Paris, France
- Died: 20 June 2016 (aged 96); Hyères, France
- Spouse(s): Pierre Heuyer (m. 1944; died 1945) Georges de Caunes (m. 1951; div. 1953) Paul Guimard (died 2004)
- Children: 3

Benoîte Groult (31 January 1920 – 20 June 2016) was a French journalist, writer, and feminist activist.

== Life and career ==
Groult was born on 31 January 1920 in Paris. She was the daughter of André Groult and Nicole Poiret, sister of Paul Poiret and herself a fashion designer, and was raised in the Parisian upper class. Groult attended the Sorbonne, where she studied Latin and Greek. After her studies in literature ended in 1953, she worked as a journalist for television. Before publishing a book of her own in 1972, she co-wrote three books with her younger sister Flora. On her own she eventually published twenty novels and numerous essays on feminism.

Because Benoîte Groult was a feminist, her novels often deal with topics such as the history of feminism, discrimination against women, and misogyny.

Her novel Les vaisseaux du cœur, published in 1988, was called pornographic by some because of its explicit sexual depictions. It was filmed by Andrew Birkin in 1992 as Salt on Our Skin.

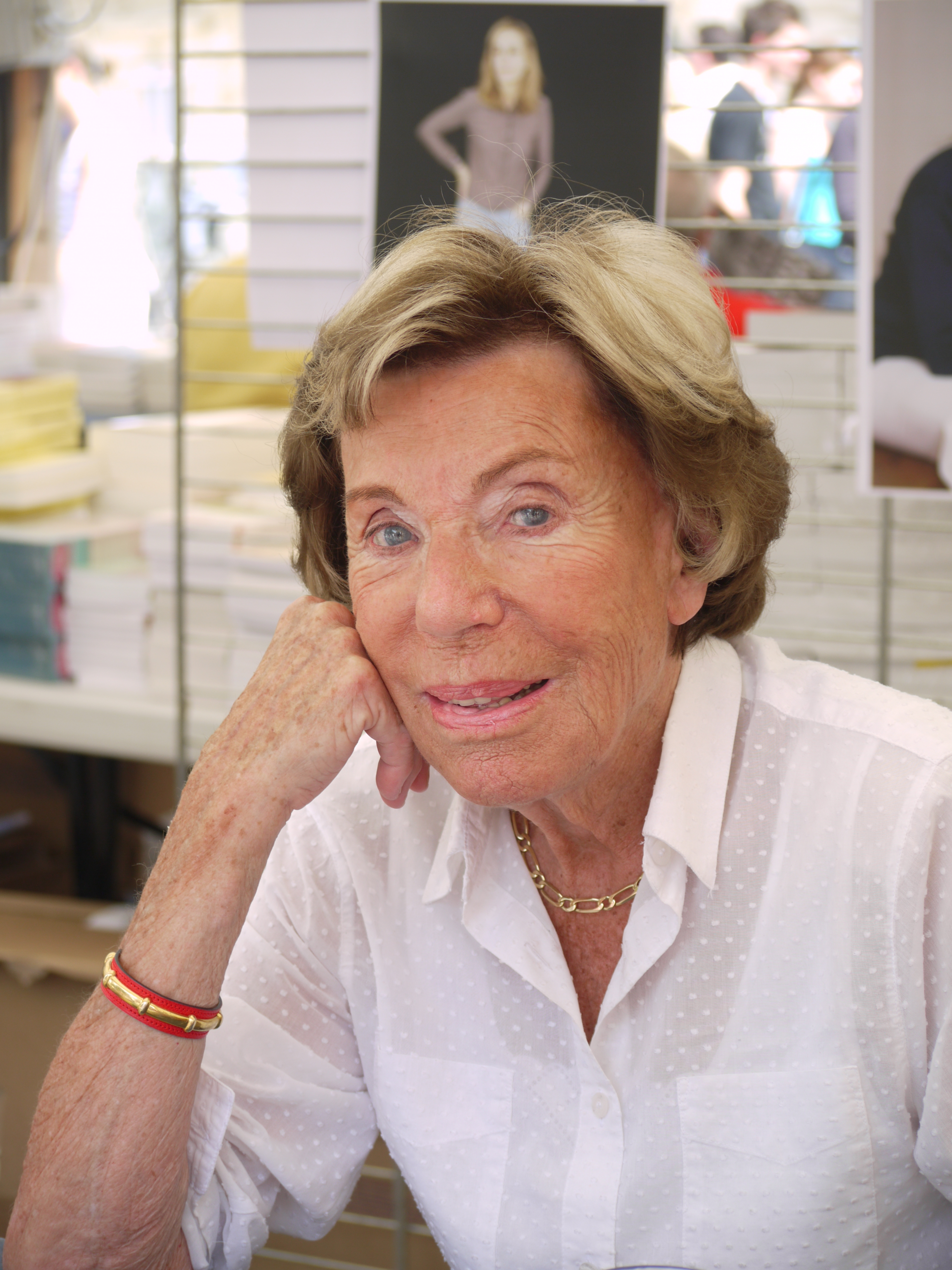
Benoîte Groult at the Comédie du Livre 2010

In April 2010, she became Commander of the Légion d'honneur.

== In popular culture ==
Benoîte Groult was the subject of several documentary films. Anne Lefant devoted the documentary Une chambre à elle: Benoîte Groult ou comment la liberté vint aux femmes to Groult, who was 86 years old at the time. It includes testimonies of Josyane Savigneau, Paul Guimard and Yvette Roudy and was published in 2006 by Hors Champ Productions. In 2008 the documentary Benoîte Groult, le temps d'apprendre à vivre, written by Marie Mitterrand and directed by Jean-Baptiste Martin, aired on France 5 as a part of the series Empreintes.

In 2013 Grasset published a graphic novel based on the life of Benoîte Groult, called Ainsi soit Benoîte Groult, by the hand of Catel.

== Personal life ==
Benoîte Groult was married three times. In 1944, she married medical student Pierre Heuyer, who died soon afterward of tuberculosis. In 1951, she married journalist Georges de Caunes with whom she had two daughters, Blandine and Lison. She later married the writer Paul Guimard (1921–2004). The couple had one daughter, Constance.

== Published books ==
- 1962: Journal à quatre mains, novel with her sister Flora Groult. Paris, Denoël. (Diary in duo. London, Barrie and Rockliff, 1965)
- 1965: Le féminin pluriel, novel with her sister Flora Groult. (Feminine Plural. Englewood Cliffs, N.J: Prentice-Hall, 1968.)
- 1967: Il était deux fois, novel with her sister Flora Groult
- 1972: La part des choses, Paris, Grasset.
- 1975: Ainsi soit-elle, essay on the social status of women, Paris: B. Grasset, 1975. ISBN 9782246001829 (Also: sound recording in 2004)
- 1977: Le féminisme au masculin, essay on feminism
- 1981: La moitié de la terre, essay
- 1983: Les trois quarts du temps, novel
- 1986: Olympe de Gouges, text submitted by Benoîte Groult
- 1988: Les vaisseaux du cœur, Paris, Grasset. ISBN 9782253053552
- 1991: Pauline Roland ou Comment la liberté vint aux femmes
- 2006: La touche étoile
- 2008: Mon evasion, Paris, Grasset. ISBN 9782246534822. (My Escape: An Autobiography. New York: Other Press, 2012. ISBN 9781590515433 )

== Sources ==
- Flitner, Bettina: Frauen mit Visionen – 48 Europäerinnen (Women with visions – 48 Europeans). With texts by Alice Schwarzer. Munich: Knesebeck, 2004. ISBN 3-89660-211-X, 100–103 p.
