= Saint-Mars-la-Jaille =

Former commune of France

- Part of Vallons-de-l'Erdre
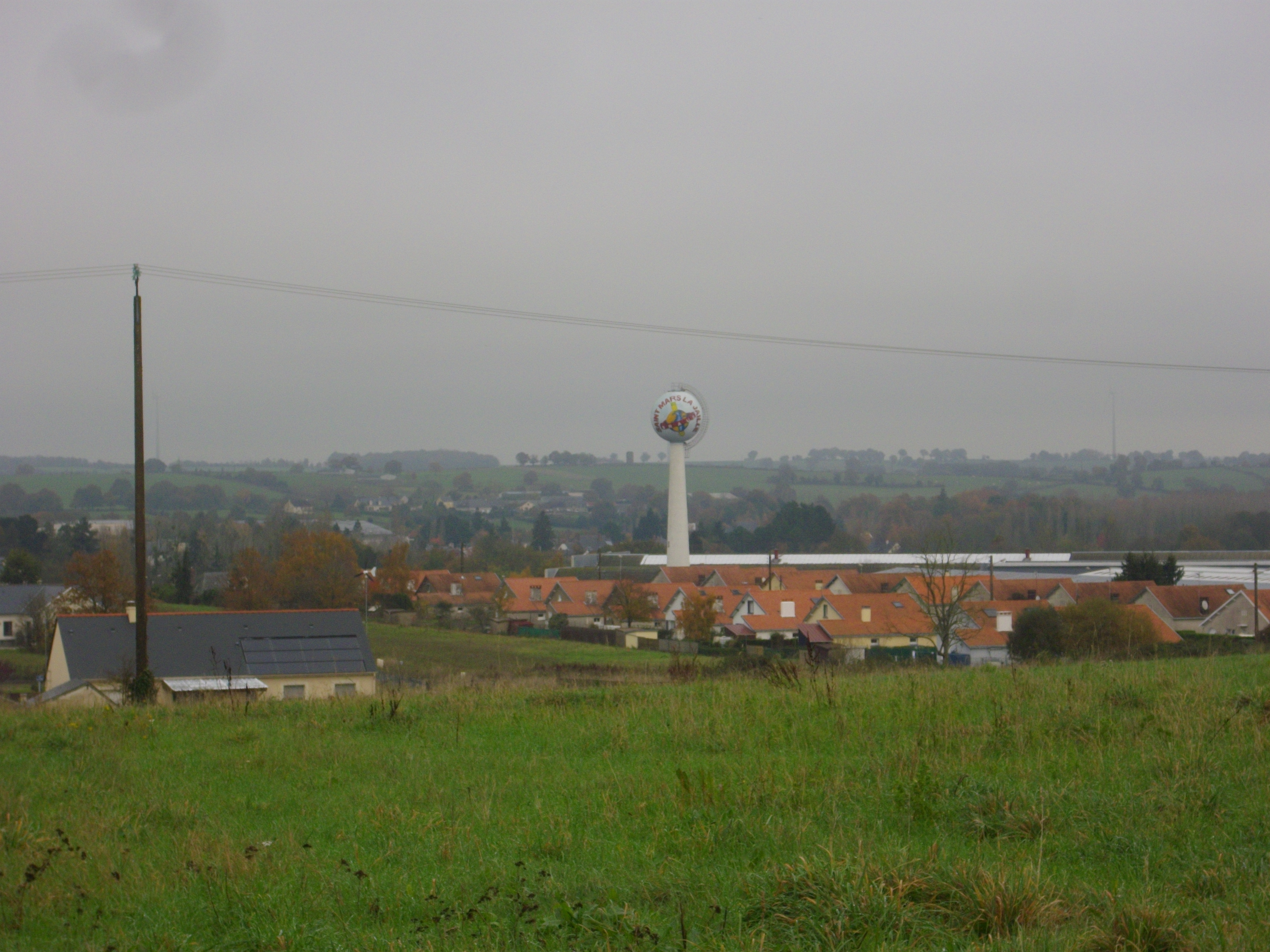
- A general view of Saint-Mars-la-Jaille

- Coat of arms
- Location of Saint-Mars-la-Jaille
- Location within France Location within Pays de la Loire
- Coordinates: 47°31′34″N 1°11′01″W
- Country: France
- Region: Pays de la Loire
- Department: Loire-Atlantique
- Arrondissement: Châteaubriant-Ancenis
- Canton: Ancenis-Saint-Géréon
- Commune: Vallons-de-l'Erdre
- Area^{1}: 20.06 km^{2} (7.75 sq mi)
- Elevation: 30 m (98 ft)
- Highest elevation: 88 m (289 ft)
- Lowest elevation: 22 m (72 ft)
- Population (2022): 2,450
  - Density: 122/km^{2} (316/sq mi)
- Time zone: UTC+01:00 (CET)
  - Summer (DST): UTC+02:00 (CEST)
- Postal code: 44540
- ^{1} French Land Register data, which excludes lakes, ponds, glaciers > 1 km^{2} (0.386 sq mi or 247 acres) and river estuaries.

Saint-Mars-la-Jaille (French pronunciation: [sɛ̃ maʁ la ʒaj]; Breton: Sant-Marzh-an-Olivenn) is a former commune in the Loire-Atlantique department in western France. On 1 January 2018, it was merged into the new commune of Vallons-de-l'Erdre.

== See also ==
- Communes of the Loire-Atlantique department
