= Chouan Army of Rennes and Fougères =

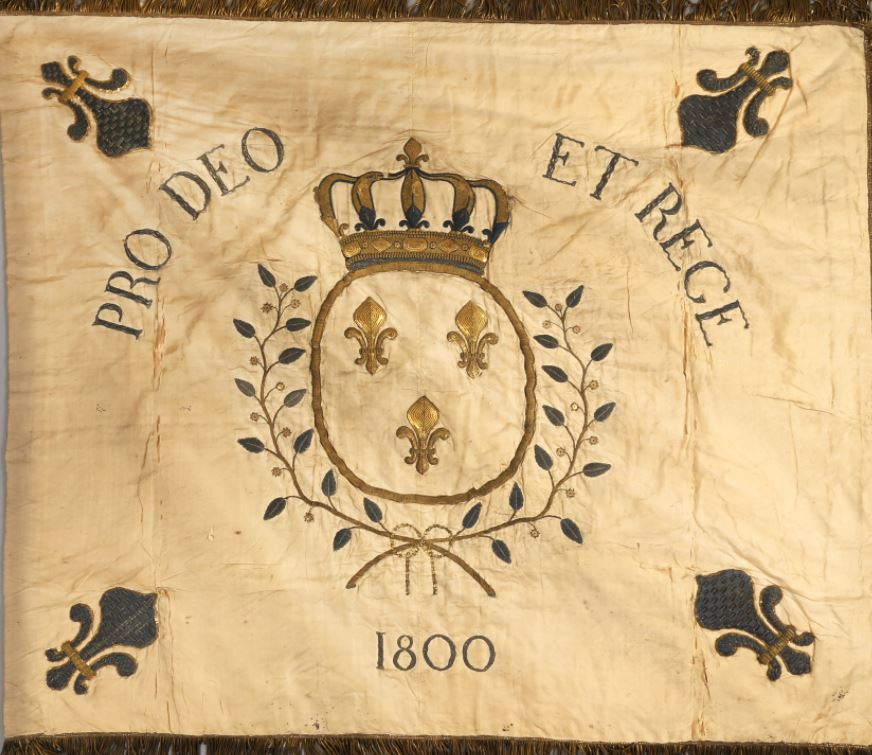
- Flag of the army
- Active: 1795
- Disbanded: 1800
- Allegiance: Louis XVII, then Louis XVIII
- Type: Chouan
- Size: 10,000
- Part of: Catholic and Royal Army
- Engagements: Chouannerie

Commanders
- Notable commanders: Joseph de Puisaye; Aimé Picquet du Boisguy; Charles Thierry de La Prévalaye

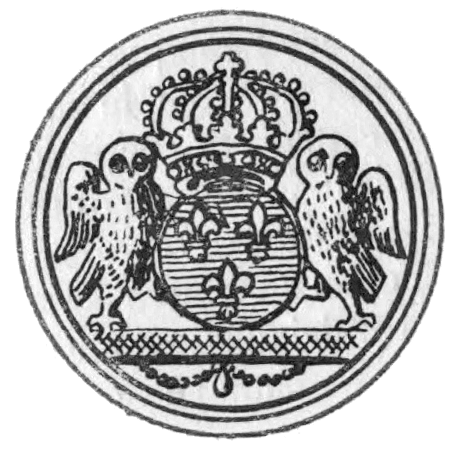
Stamp of the royalist army of Brittany

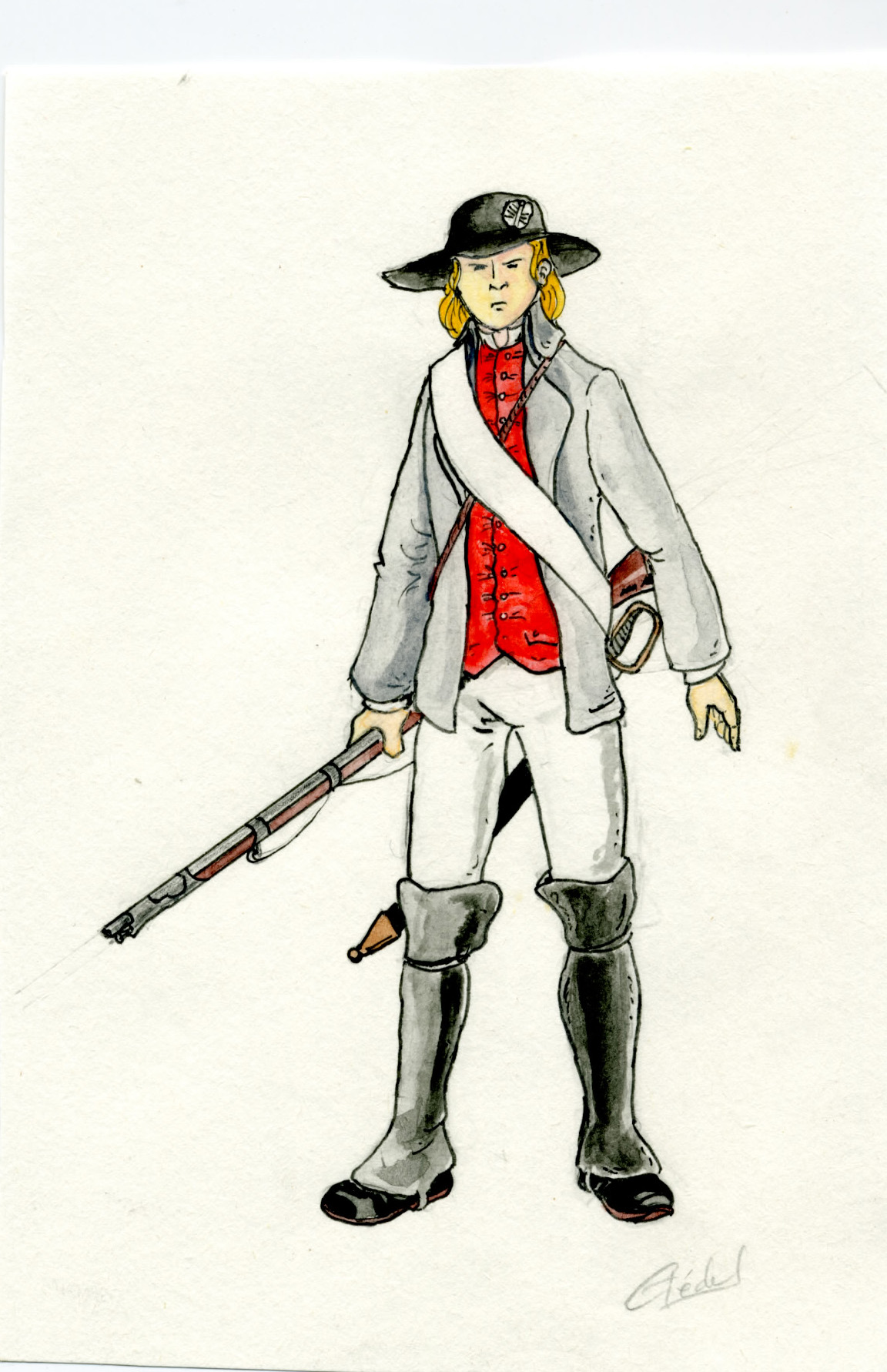
Typical uniform of the Armée des Chouans de Rennes et Fougères

The Chouan Army of Rennes and Fougères (Armée des Chouans de Rennes et Fougères or armée royale de Rennes et de Fougères) was a royalist counter-revolutionary army that operated in the 1790s in revolutionary France. The army was founded in 1794 as part of the Catholic and Royal Army of Brittany, but split from it under its leader Lieutenant General Joseph de Puisaye in 1795. The army was made up of people active in the Chouannerie revolts.

== Background and history ==
The French monarchy was abolished and replaced by the French First Republic in September 1792. In 1793, Joseph de Puisaye turned against the republic when the Jacobins proscribed the reformist Girondin movement, with which he was aligned. After republican forces ambushed his military unit and sacked his estate, he fled to the forest of Le Pertre in Brittany and attempted to organise the Chouan factions into an anti-Jacobin army.

In October 1794, Puisaye was named Lieutenant General of the army of Brittany by the Count Charles of Artois but did not have the support of all divisions. He formed the Rennes and Fougères in 1795, and passed on its command to Aimé Picquet du Boisguy, head of the Chouans in the area from 1793 onwards. It merged the Royalist divisions from Ille-et-Vilaine and some from Côtes d'Armor. His influence also extended to some areas of Mayenne in Maine, and Manche in Normandy.

French royalists were always historically divided, and British government gave support to Puisaye's plan to unite all royalist insurgents under his leadership and restore the monarchy. However, divisions remained, leading to defeat at Quiberon in the invasion of France (1795). After 1796 its influence declined and, from 1799, it was limited to Ille-et-Vilaine alone.

== Divisions (1794-1796) ==
In 1796, these divisions were under the direction of Joseph de Puisaye and assisted by Boisguy, but whose real command did not have time to be effective. The Fougères division numbered 3,000 men, that of Vitré 1,500, the 8 others were about 7,000 men strong in total.

- Catholic and Royal Army of Brittany and Company of Catholic Knights Lieutenant-General: Joseph de Puisaye Major-General: René Augustin de Chalus
- Army of Rennes and Fougères Brigadier: Aimé Picquet du Boisguy
- 1st division, Fougères, 3000 men Colonel: Aimé Picquet du Boisguy, then Colonel: Auguste Hay de Bonteville

== See also ==
- War in the Vendée
