= Freigné =

- Part of Vallons-de-l'Erdre
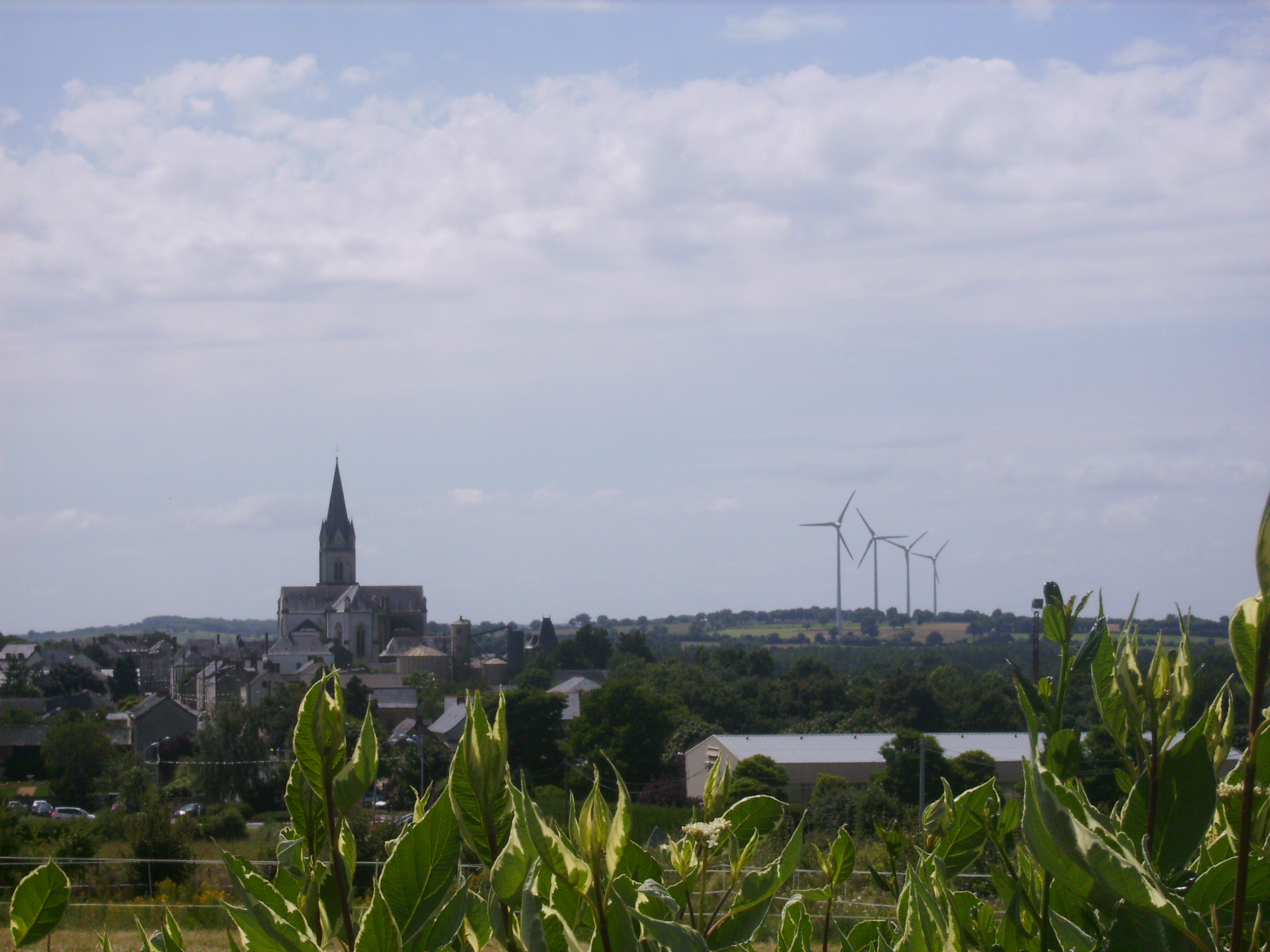
- A general view of Freigné

- Coat of arms
- Location of Freigné
- Location within France Location within Pays de la Loire
- Coordinates: 47°32′57″N 1°07′16″W
- Country: France
- Region: Pays de la Loire
- Department: Loire-Atlantique
- Arrondissement: Châteaubriant-Ancenis
- Canton: Ancenis-Saint-Géréon
- Commune: Vallons-de-l'Erdre
- Area^{1}: 65.26 km^{2} (25.20 sq mi)
- Elevation: 52 m (171 ft)
- Highest elevation: 85 m (279 ft)
- Lowest elevation: 27 m (89 ft)
- Population (2022): 1,194
  - Density: 18.30/km^{2} (47.39/sq mi)
- Demonym(s): Freignéen, Freignéenne
- Time zone: UTC+01:00 (CET)
  - Summer (DST): UTC+02:00 (CEST)
- Postal code: 49440
- ^{1} French Land Register data, which excludes lakes, ponds, glaciers > 1 km^{2} (0.386 sq mi or 247 acres) and river estuaries.

Freigné (French pronunciation: [fʁɛɲe]) is a former commune in the Loire-Atlantique department in western France. Before 1 January 2018, it was part of the Maine-et-Loire department. On 1 January 2018, it was merged into the new commune of Vallons-de-l'Erdre.
