= Passengers (British TV series) =

British television series

Passengers is a British mid-1990s and early-2000s Channel 4 television programme about youth culture.

Some time after its original mid-1990s incarnation, the programme was revived for a new series in early 2001, initially for sister station E4.

In its original mid-1990s incarnation, it featured a pre-Trainspotting Ewan McGregor, Geoff Thompson, Notorious B.I.G., Take That and drum and bass musician Goldie. The theme tune was a portion of "The Passenger" by Iggy Pop and Ricky Gardiner.
