= Arrondissement of Ancenis =

Coordinates: 47°22′N 1°11′W

Ancenis
- Former arrondissement
- Location within the department Loire-Atlantique
- Country: France
- Region: Pays de la Loire
- Department: Loire-Atlantique
- No. of communes: {{{nbcomm}}}
- Disbanded: 2017
- Area: 785 km^{2} (303 sq mi)
- Population (2012): 61,457
  - Density: 78.3/km^{2} (203/sq mi)

The arrondissement of Ancenis is a former arrondissement of France in the Loire-Atlantique department in the Pays de la Loire region. In January 2017 it was merged into the new arrondissement of Châteaubriant-Ancenis. At the time of the merger, it had 24 communes. Its population was 61,457 (2012).

== Composition ==
The communes of the arrondissement of Ancenis, and their INSEE codes, were:

1. Ancenis (44003)
2. Bonnœuvre (44017)
3. Le Cellier (44028)
4. Couffé (44048)
5. Joué-sur-Erdre (44077)
6. Ligné (44082)
7. Loireauxence (44213)
8. Maumusson (44093)
9. Mésanger (44096)
10. Montrelais (44104)
11. Mouzeil (44107)
12. Oudon (44115)
13. Pannecé (44118)
14. Le Pin (44124)
15. Pouillé-les-Côteaux (44134)
16. Riaillé (44144)
17. La Roche-Blanche (44222)
18. Saint-Géréon (44160)
19. Saint-Mars-la-Jaille (44180)
20. Saint-Sulpice-des-Landes (44191)
21. Teillé (44202)
22. Trans-sur-Erdre (44207)
23. Vair-sur-Loire (44163)
24. Vritz (44219)

== History ==
The arrondissement of Ancenis was created in 1800, disbanded in 1926 and restored in 1943. It was disbanded in 2017. As a result of the reorganisation of the cantons of France which came into effect in 2015, the borders of the cantons are no longer related to the borders of the arrondissements. The cantons of the arrondissement of Ancenis were, as of January 2015:

1. Ancenis
2. Ligné
3. Riaillé
4. Saint-Mars-la-Jaille
5. Varades
