= List of twin towns and sister cities in England =

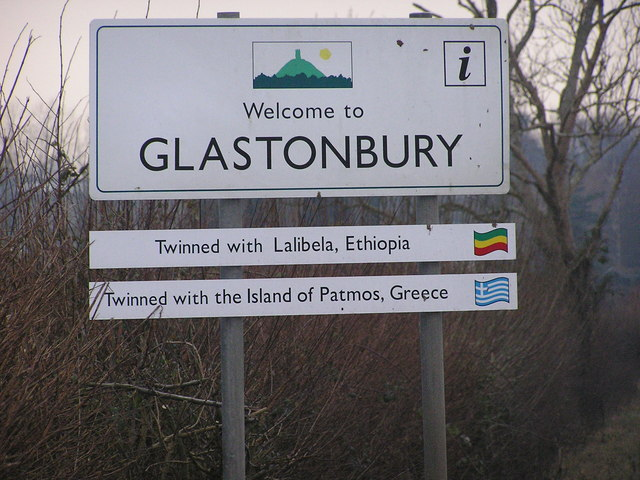
Twin towns of Glastonbury

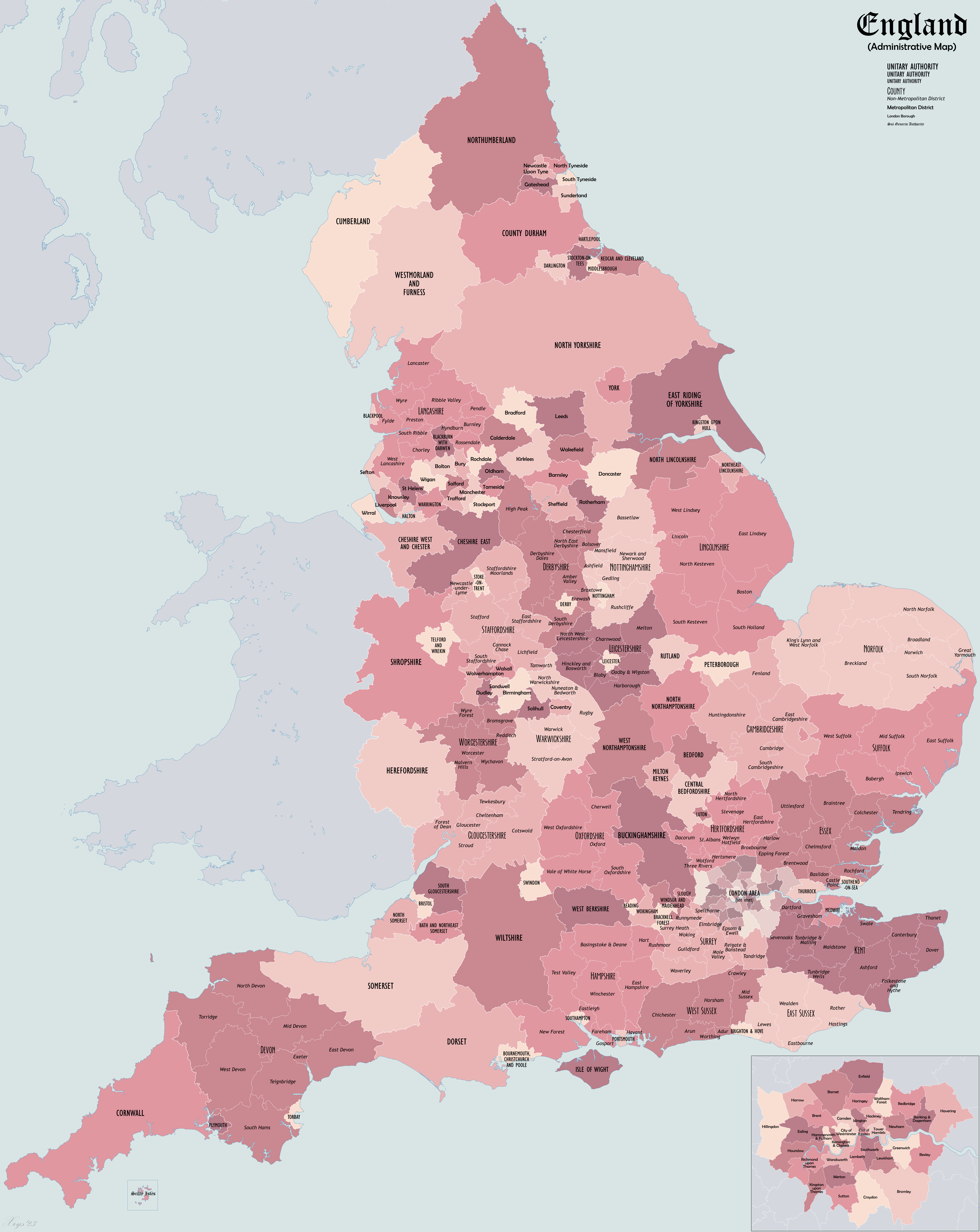
Administrative divisions of England

This is a list of places in England which have standing links to local communities in other countries known as "town twinning" (usually in Europe) or "sister cities" (usually in the rest of the world).

== A ==
Abingdon-on-Thames

- Argentan, France
- Lucca, Italy
- Schongau, Germany
- Sint-Niklaas, Belgium

Adur

- Riom, France
- Żywiec, Poland

Alcester

- Vallet, France

Alnwick

- Lagny-sur-Marne, France
- Time, Norway
- Voerde, Germany

Alton

- Montecchio Maggiore, Italy
- Pertuis, France

Alveston

- Courville-sur-Eure, France

Amber Valley

- Blackstone Valley, United States
- Głogów, Poland
- Laholm, Sweden

Amersham

- Bensheim, Germany
- Krynica-Zdrój, Poland

Ampthill

- Nissan-lez-Enserune, France

Andover

- Andover, United States
- Goch, Germany
- Redon, France

Ashburton

- Cléder, France

Ashby-de-la-Zouch

- Evans, United States
- Pithiviers, France

Ashford

- Bad Münstereifel, Germany
- Fougères, France
- Hopewell, United States

Ashington

- Remscheid, Germany

Ashton-under-Lyne

- Chaumont, France

Aylesbury

- Bourg-en-Bresse, France

== B ==
=== Ba ===
Baldock

- Eisenberg, Germany
- Sanvignes-les-Mines, France

Banbury

- Ermont, France
- Hennef, Germany

Bardsey cum Rigton

- Kisdorf, Germany

Barking and Dagenham

- Tczew, Poland
- Witten, Germany

Barnet

- Chaville, France
- Montclair, United States
- Morphou, Cyprus
- Pokhara, Nepal
- Le Raincy, France
- Ramat Gan, Israel
- Siegen-Wittgenstein (district), Germany
- Tempelhof-Schöneberg (Berlin), Germany

Barnsley

- Horlivka, Ukraine
- Schwäbisch Gmünd, Germany

Barnstaple

- Barnstable, United States
- Harstad, Norway
- Susa, Italy
- Trouville-sur-Mer, France
- Uelzen, Germany

Barrow upon Soar

- Marans, France

Basildon

- Heiligenhaus, Germany
- Meaux, France

Basingstoke and Deane

- Alençon, France
- Braine-l'Alleud, Belgium
- Euskirchen, Germany

Bassetlaw

- Aurillac, France
- Farmers Branch, United States
- Garbsen, Germany
- Pfungstadt, Germany

Bath

- Aix-en-Provence, France
- Alkmaar, Netherlands
- Beppu, Japan
- Braunschweig, Germany
- Kaposvár, Hungary
- Northern Beaches, Australia

Batheaston

- Oudon, France

Bathford

- Artannes-sur-Indre, France

Battle

- Saint-Valery-sur-Somme, France

=== Be–Bo ===
Beaminster

- Saint-James, France

Beccles

- Petit-Couronne, France

Bedford

- Bamberg, Germany
- Rovigo, Italy
- Włocławek, Poland

Belper

- Pawtucket, United States

Beverley

- Lemgo, Germany
- Nogent-sur-Oise, France

Bewdley

- Fort-Mahon-Plage, France
- Vellmar, Germany

Bexley

- Arnsberg, Germany
- Évry-Courcouronnes, France

Bidford-on-Avon

- Ebsdorfergrund, Germany

Biddulph

- Fusignano, Italy

Bideford

- Landivisiau, France
- Manteo, United States

Biggleswade

- Erlensee, Germany

Bilbrook

- Saint-Pryvé-Saint-Mesmin, France

Billericay

- Billerica, United States
- Chauvigny, France
- Fishers, United States

Birchington

- La Chapelle-d'Armentières, France

Birmingham

- Chicago, United States
- Frankfurt am Main, Germany
- Guangzhou, China
- Johannesburg, South Africa
- Leipzig, Germany
- Lyon, France
- Milan, Italy
- Zaporizhzhia, Ukraine

Birstall

- Rixensart, Belgium

Blackburn

- Altena, Germany
- Péronne, France
- Tarnów, Poland

Blackpool

- Bottrop, Germany
- Sanya, China

Blyth

- Solingen, Germany

Bodmin

- Bad Bederkesa (Geestland), Germany
- Grass Valley, United States
- Le Relecq-Kerhuon, France

Bognor Regis

- Saint-Maur-des-Fossés, France
- Trebbin, Germany
- Weil am Rhein, Germany

Bolton

- Le Mans, France
- Paderborn, Germany

Bournemouth

- Lucerne, Switzerland
- Netanya, Israel

=== Br ===
Brackley

- Montabaur, Germany
- Les Pavillons-sous-Bois, France

Bracknell

- Leverkusen, Germany

Bradford

- Galway, Ireland
- Hamm, Germany
- Mönchengladbach, Germany
- Roubaix, France
- Skopje, North Macedonia
- Verviers, Belgium

Bradley Stoke

- Champs-sur-Marne, France

Bradninch

- Landunvez, France

Brampton

- Berry-Bouy, France
- Marmagne, France

Brent

- South Dublin, Ireland

Brentwood

- Montbazon, France
- Roth (district), Germany

Bridgnorth

- Schrobenhausen, Germany
- Thiers, France

Bridgwater

- La Ciotat, France
- Homberg, Germany
- Marsa, Malta
- Uherské Hradiště, Czech Republic

Bridlington

- Millau, France

Bridport

- Saint-Vaast-la-Hougue, France

Brighouse

- Lüdenscheid, Germany

Bristol

- Beira, Mozambique
- Bordeaux, France
- Guangzhou, China
- Hanover, Germany
- Porto, Portugal
- Puerto Morazán, Nicaragua
- Tbilisi, Georgia

Broadstairs and St Peter's

- Wattignies, France

Bromley

- Neuwied, Germany

Bromsgrove

- Gronau, Germany
- Saint-Sauveur-Lendelin, France

Bromyard

- Athis-Val de Rouvre, France

Broxtowe

- Gütersloh, Germany

Brundall

- Maurecourt, France

=== Bu ===
Buckingham

- Mouvaux, France
- Neukirchen-Vluyn, Germany

Bude-Stratton

- Ergué-Gabéric, France

Buntingford

- Luynes, France
- Ólvega, Spain

Burgess Hill

- Abbeville, France
- Schmallenberg, Germany

Burham

- L'Épine, France

Burnley

- Vitry-sur-Seine, France

Burton Latimer

- Altendiez, Germany

Burton upon Trent

- Elkhart, United States
- Lingen, Germany

Bury

- Angoulême, France
- Datong, China
- Schorndorf, Germany
- Tulle, France
- Woodbury, United States

Bury St Edmunds

- Compiègne, France
- Kevelaer, Germany

Buxton

- Bad Nauheim, Germany
- Oignies, France

== C ==
=== Ca ===
Calderdale

- County Mayo, Ireland
- Musoma, Tanzania
- Strakonice, Czech Republic

Callington

- Barsbüttel, Germany
- Guipavas, France

Caddington

- Oststeinbek, Germany

Calne

- Caln Township, United States
- Charlieu, France
- Eningen unter Achalm, Germany

Calstock

- Saint-Thuriau, France

Camborne

- Sainte-Anne-d'Auray, France

Cambridge

- Heidelberg, Germany
- Szeged, Hungary

Cannock Chase

- Datteln, Germany
- Western Springs, United States

Canterbury

- Bloomington, United States
- Esztergom, Hungary
- Normal, United States
- Reims, France
- Vladimir, Russia

Carlisle

- Flensburg, Germany
- Słupsk, Poland

Cawsand

- Porspoder, France

=== Ch ===
Chard

- Helmstedt, Germany
- Morangis, France
- Șeica Mare, Romania

Cheddar

- Felsberg, Germany
- Vernouillet, France

Chelmsford

- Annonay, France
- Backnang, Germany
- Wuxi, China

Cheltenham

- Annecy, France
- Cheltenham, United States
- Göttingen, Germany
- Weihai, China

Chesham

- Archena, Spain
- Friedrichsdorf, Germany
- Houilles, France

Chester

- Lörrach, Germany
- Senigallia, Italy
- Sens, France

Chesterfield

- Darmstadt, Germany
- Troyes, France
- Tsumeb, Namibia
- Yangquan, China

Chichester

- Chartres, France
- Ravenna, Italy
- Speyer, Germany

Chipping Sodbury

- Cesson, France

Christchurch

- Aalen, Germany
- Christchurch, New Zealand
- Saint-Lô, France
- Tatabánya, Hungary

=== Ci–Cr ===
Cirencester

- Itzehoe, Germany
- Saint-Genis-Laval, France

Cleethorpes

- Königswinter, Germany

Clevedon

- Épernay, France
- Ettlingen, Germany
- Middelkerke, Belgium

Coalville

- Romans-sur-Isère, France

Cockermouth

- Marvejols, France

Codsall

- Saint-Pryvé-Saint-Mesmin, France

Colchester

- Avignon, France
- Imola, Italy
- Wetzlar, Germany
- Yangzhou, China

Coleshill

- Chassieu, France

Colney Heath

- Boissy-sous-Saint-Yon, France

Congleton

- Trappes, France

Coniston

- Fonteno, Italy
- Illiers-Combray, France
- Riva di Solto, Italy
- Solto Collina, Italy

Constantine

- Pont-Croix, France

Corby

- Châtellerault, France
- Shijiazhuang, China
- Velbert, Germany

Corsham

- Jargeau, France

Coventry

- Arnhem, Netherlands
- Belgrade, Serbia
- Bologna, Italy
- Cork, Ireland
- Cornwall, Canada
- Coventry, Connecticut, United States
- Coventry, New York, United States
- Coventry, Rhode Island, United States
- Dresden, Germany
- Galați, Romania
- Granby, Canada
- Graz, Austria
- Jinan, China
- Kecskemét, Hungary
- Kiel, Germany
- Kingston, Jamaica
- Lidice, Czech Republic
- Ostrava, Czech Republic
- Parkes, Australia
- Saint-Étienne, France
- Sarajevo, Bosnia and Herzegovina
- Windsor, Canada

Crawley

- Dorsten, Germany

Crewe

- Bischofsheim, Germany
- Dzierżoniów, Poland
- Mâcon, France

Crowborough

- Horwich, England, United Kingdom
- Montargis, France

Croydon

- Arnhem, Netherlands

== D ==
Dacorum

- Neu-Isenburg, Germany

Dalton-in-Furness

- Dalton, United States

Darley Dale

- Veuzain-sur-Loire, France

Darlington

- Amiens, France
- Mülheim an der Ruhr, Germany

Dartford

- Gravelines, France
- Hanau, Germany
- Namyangju, South Korea
- Tallinn, Estonia

Dawlish

- Carhaix-Plouguer, France

Denton

- Kierspe, Germany
- Montigny-le-Bretonneux, France

Derby

- Hebron, Palestine
- Osnabrück, Germany

Derbyshire

- Toyota, Japan
- Yangpu (Shanghai), China

Desborough is a member of the Charter of European Rural Communities, a town twinning association across the European Union. Desborough also has one other twin town.

Charter of European Rural Communities

- Bienvenida, Spain
- Bièvre, Belgium
- Bucine, Italy
- Cashel, Ireland
- Cissé, France
- Esch (Haaren), Netherlands
- Hepstedt, Germany
- Ibănești, Romania
- Kandava (Tukums), Latvia
- Kannus, Finland
- Kolindros, Greece
- Lassee, Austria
- Medzev, Slovakia
- Næstved, Denmark
- Nagycenk, Hungary
- Nadur, Malta
- Ockelbo, Sweden
- Pano Lefkara, Cyprus
- Põlva, Estonia
- Samuel (Soure), Portugal
- Starý Poddvorov, Czech Republic
- Strzyżów, Poland
- Svoge, Bulgaria
- Tisno, Croatia
- Troisvierges, Luxembourg
- Žagarė (Joniškis), Lithuania

Other

- Neuville-de-Poitou, France

Devizes

- Mayenne, France
- Oamaru (Waitaki), New Zealand
- Tornio, Finland
- Waiblingen, Germany

Didcot

- Meylan, France
- Planegg, Germany

Ditton

- Rang-du-Fliers, France

Doncaster

- Camden, England, United Kingdom
- Gliwice, Poland
- Herten, Germany
- Wilmington, United States

Dorchester

- Bayeux, France
- Lübbecke, Germany

Dover

- Calais, France
- Split, Croatia

Drayton

- Lesparre-Médoc, France

Driffield

- Saint-Affrique, France

Droitwich Spa

- Bad Ems, Germany
- Voiron, France

Dronfield

- Sindelfingen, Germany

Droylsden

- Villemomble, France

Dukinfield

- Champagnole, France

Dunstable

- Bourgoin-Jallieu, France
- Porz (Cologne), Germany

Durham

- Alcalá de Guadaíra, Spain
- Banská Bystrica, Slovakia
- Durham, United States
- Jász-Nagykun-Szolnok County, Hungary
- Nakskov (Lolland), Denmark
- Somme, France
- Tübingen, Germany
- Wesel (district), Germany

Dursley

- Bovenden, Germany

== E ==
Ealing

- Bielany (Warsaw), Poland
- Marcq-en-Barœul, France
- Steinfurt (district), Germany

East Bergholt

- Barbizon, France

East Cambridgeshire

- Kempen, Germany

East Grinstead

- Bourg-de-Péage, France
- Mindelheim, Germany
- Sant Feliu de Guíxols, Spain
- Schwaz, Austria
- Verbania, Italy

East Hendred

- Sarceaux, France

East Hoathly with Halland

- Juziers, France

East Sussex

- Essonne, France
- Pinneberg (district), Germany

Eastleigh

- Kornwestheim, Germany
- Temple Terrace, United States
- Villeneuve-Saint-Georges, France

Eastwood

- Szolnok, Hungary

Edenbridge

- Mont-Saint-Aignan, France

Elland

- Riorges, France

Ellesmere Port

- Reutlingen, Germany

Elstree and Borehamwood

- Fontenay-aux-Roses, France
- Offenburg, Germany

Ely

- Esbjerg, Denmark

Enfield

- Chalandri, Greece
- Courbevoie, France
- Gladbeck, Germany
- Sarıyer, Turkey

Epsom and Ewell

- Chantilly, France

Evesham

- Dreux, France
- Evesham, United States
- Melsungen, Germany

Exeter

- Bad Homburg vor der Höhe, Germany
- Rennes, France
- Terracina, Italy

Exmouth

- Dinan, France
- Langerwehe, Germany

Eye

- Pouzauges, France

== F ==
Falmouth

- Douarnenez, France
- Rotenburg (district), Germany

Fareham

- Pulheim, Germany
- Vannes, France

Faringdon

- Le Mêle-sur-Sarthe, France

Farnham

- Andernach, Germany

Faversham

- Hazebrouck, France

Felixstowe

- Salzwedel, Germany
- Wesel, Germany

Fenland

- Nettetal, Germany
- Sunshine Coast, Australia

Feock

- Hôpital-Camfrout, France

Filton

- Saint-Vallier, France
- Witzenhausen, Germany

Folkestone

- Boulogne-sur-Mer, France
- Étaples, France

Fordingbridge

- Vimoutiers, France

Forest Row

- Milly-la-Forêt, France

Frome

- Château-Gontier, France
- Murrhardt, Germany
- Rabka-Zdrój, Poland

== G ==
Gateshead

- Komatsu, Japan
- Saint-Étienne-du-Rouvray, France

Glastonbury

- Lalibela, Ethiopia
- Patmos, Greece

Glossop

- Bad Vilbel, Germany

Gloucester

- Metz, France
- Trier, Germany

Godalming

- Joigny, France
- Mayen, Germany

Godmanchester

- Gubbio, Italy
- Salon-de-Provence, France
- Szentendre, Hungary
- Wertheim, Germany

Grantham

- Sankt Augustin, Germany

Gravesham

- Cambrai, France
- Chesterfield County, United States
- Jalandhar, India
- Neumünster, Germany

Great Shelford

- Verneuil-en-Halatte, France

Great Torrington

- Roscoff, France

Great Yarmouth

- Rambouillet, France

Greater Manchester

- Osaka, Japan

Greenwich

- Maribor, Slovenia
- Reinickendorf (Berlin), Germany
- Tema, Ghana

Grendon

- Bois-Bernard, France

Grove

- Mably, France

Guildford

- Freiburg im Breisgau, Germany

== H ==
=== Ha ===
Hackney

- St. George's, Grenada
- Suresnes, France

Hadleigh

- Rousies, France

Hailsham

- Gournay-en-Bray, France

Halesworth

- Bouchain, France
- Eitorf, Germany

Halifax

- Aachen, Germany

Halton

- Leiria, Portugal
- Marzahn-Hellersdorf (Berlin), Germany
- Tongling, China
- Ústí nad Labem, Czech Republic

Hammersmith and Fulham

- Anderlecht, Belgium
- Boulogne-Billancourt, France
- Montefiore Conca, Italy
- Neukölln (Berlin), Germany
- Zaanstad, Netherlands

Haringey

- Arima, Trinidad and Tobago
- Clarendon, Jamaica
- Koblenz, Germany
- Larnaca, Cyprus
- Livry-Gargan, France

Harlow

- Havířov, Czech Republic
- Tingalpa (Brisbane), Australia
- Vélizy-Villacoublay, France

Harpenden

- Alzey, Germany
- Cosne-Cours-sur-Loire, France

Harrogate

- Bagnères-de-Luchon, France
- Barrie, Canada
- Montecatini Terme, Italy
- Wellington, New Zealand

Harrow

- Douai, France

Hartlepool

- Hückelhoven, Germany
- Muskegon, United States
- Sliema, Malta

Hastings

- Béthune, France
- Dordrecht, Netherlands
- Oudenaarde, Belgium
- Schwerte, Germany

Hatfield

- Merksplas, Belgium

Havant

- Wesermarsch, Germany
- Yavoriv Raion, Ukraine

Haverhill

- Ehringshausen, Germany
- Pont-Saint-Esprit, France

Havering

- Hesdin, France
- Ludwigshafen am Rhein, Germany

Haworth

- Aguas Calientes, Peru

Haywards Heath

- Bondues, France
- Traunstein, Germany

=== He ===
Heathfield and Waldron

- Forges-les-Eaux, France

Hebden Royd

- Saint-Pol-sur-Ternoise, France
- Warstein, Germany

Helston

- Pleumeur-Bodou, France
- Port Augusta, Australia
- Sasso Marconi, Italy

Hemyock

- Pouillé-les-Côteaux, France
- La Roche-Blanche, France
- Vair-sur-Loire, France

Henley-on-Thames

- Bled, Slovenia
- Falaise, France
- Leichlingen, Germany

Hereford

- Dillenburg, Germany
- Jaworzno, Poland
- Vierzon, France

Herne Bay

- Waltrop, Germany
- Wimereux, France

Hertford

- Évron, France
- Wildeshausen, Germany

Hessle

- Thizy-les-Bourgs, France

=== Hi–Hy ===
High Wycombe

- Kelkheim, Germany

Higham Ferrers

- Hachenburg, Germany

Hillingdon

- Mantes-la-Jolie, France
- Schleswig, Germany

Hinckley

- Le Grand-Quevilly, France
- Herford, Germany

Hitchin

- Bingen am Rhein, Germany
- Nuits-Saint-Georges, France

Horndean

- Aubergenville, France

Horsham

- Lage, Germany
- Saint-Maixent-l'École, France

Hounslow

- Issy-les-Moulineaux, France
- Jalandhar, India
- Lahore, Pakistan
- Ramallah, Palestine

Huntingdon

- Gubbio, Italy
- Salon-de-Provence, France
- Szentendre, Hungary
- Wertheim, Germany

Hurst Green

- Ellerhoop, Germany

Hythe

- Berck, France
- Poperinge, Belgium

== I ==
Ilkeston

- Châlons-en-Champagne, France

Ilkley

- Coutances, France

Ipswich

- Arras, France

Irchester

- Coulon, France

Isle of Portland

- Holzwickede, Germany
- Louviers, France

Isle of Wight

- Coburg, Germany

== K ==
Kegworth

- Bihorel, France
- Bois-Guillaume, France
- Bosc-Guérard-Saint-Adrien, France
- Isneauville, France
- Fontaine-le-Bourg, France
- Ry, France

Keighley

- Manzini, Eswatini
- Myrtle Beach, United States
- Poix-du-Nord, France

Kendal

- Killarney, Ireland
- Rinteln, Germany

Kenilworth

- Bourg-la-Reine, France
- Eppstein, Germany
- Roccalumera, Italy

Kensington and Chelsea

- Cannes, France

Kenton

- Linkebeek, Belgium
- Val-du-Layon, France

Kettering

- Kettering, United States
- Lahnstein, Germany

Keynsham

- Libourne, France

Kidderminster

- Husum, Germany

Kidsgrove

- Saint-Paul-du-Bois, France

Kingsbridge

- Weilerbach, Germany

Kingston upon Hull

- Freetown, Sierra Leone
- Niigata, Japan
- Raleigh, United States
- Szczecin, Poland

Kingston upon Thames

- Gwanak (Seoul), South Korea
- Jaffna, Sri Lanka
- Oldenburg, Germany

Kington

- Marines, France

King's Lynn

- Emmerich am Rhein, Germany

Kirkby-in-Ashfield

- Ronchin, France

Kirklees

- Besançon, France
- Bielsko-Biała, Poland
- Kostanay, Kazakhstan
- Unna (district), Germany

Knowsley

- Moers, Germany

Knutsford

- Montmorency, France

== L ==
=== La–Le ===
Lambeth

- Brooklyn (New York), United States
- Vincennes, France

Lancaster

- Aalborg, Denmark
- Lublin, Poland
- Perpignan, France
- Rendsburg, Germany
- Växjö, Sweden

Launceston

- Achim (Börßum), Germany
- Plestin-les-Grèves, France

Ledbury

- Strömstad, Sweden

Leeds

- Brno, Czech Republic
- Dortmund, Germany
- Durban, South Africa
- Hangzhou, China
- Lille, France
- Siegen, Germany

Leek

- Este, Italy

Leicester

- Chongqing, China
- Haskovo, Bulgaria
- Krefeld, Germany
- Masaya, Nicaragua
- Rajkot, India
- Strasbourg, France

Leighton–Linslade

- Coulommiers, France
- Titisee-Neustadt, Germany

Leominster

- Saverne, France

Letchworth Garden City

- Chagny, France
- Kristiansand, Norway
- Wissen, Germany

Lewes

- Blois, France
- Waldshut-Tiengen, Germany

Lewisham

- Antony, France
- Charlottenburg-Wilmersdorf (Berlin), Germany
- Kingston, Jamaica

=== Li ===
Lichfield

- Limburg an der Lahn, Germany
- Sainte-Foy-lès-Lyon, France

Lincoln

- Neustadt an der Weinstraße, Germany
- Port Lincoln, Australia
- Radomsko, Poland
- Nanchang, China
- Tangshan, China

Liskeard

- Quimperlé, France

Little Shelford

- Verneuil-en-Halatte, France

Littlehampton

- Chennevières-sur-Marne, France
- Durmersheim, Germany

Littlethorpe

- Genappe, Belgium

Liverpool

- Birmingham, United States
- Cologne, Germany
- Dublin, Ireland
- Ho Chi Minh City, Vietnam
- Odesa, Ukraine
- Panama City, Panama
- Rio de Janeiro, Brazil
- Shanghai, China
- Surabaya, Indonesia

Lizard

- Landévennec, France

=== Lo–Ly ===
London

- Beijing, China
- Berlin, Germany
- Bogotá, Colombia
- Kuala Lumpur, Malaysia
- Moscow, Russia
- New York City, United States
- Santiago, Chile
- Shanghai, China
- Tokyo, Japan

Long Eaton

- Langen, Germany
- Romorantin-Lanthenay, France

Longdendale

- Ruppichteroth, Germany

Looe

- Quiberon, France

Lostwithiel

- Pleyber-Christ, France

Loughborough

- Épinal, France
- Gembloux, Belgium
- Schwäbisch Hall, Germany
- Zamość, Poland

Lowestoft

- Plaisir, France

Ludlow

- La Ferté-Macé, France
- Narberth, Wales, United Kingdom
- San Pietro in Cariano, Italy

Luton

- Bergisch Gladbach, Germany
- Eskilstuna, Sweden
- Spandau (Berlin), Germany

Lutterworth

- Chambourcy, France

Lyme Regis

- Barfleur, France
- Jamestown, United States
- St. George's, Bermuda

Lymington

- Almansa, Spain
- Mosbach, Germany
- Vitré, Ille-et-Vilaine, France

Lytham St Annes

- Caudry, France
- Werne, Germany

== M ==
Mabe

- Primelin, France

Maidstone

- Beauvais, France

Maldon

- Cuijk, Netherlands
- Villeparisis, France

Malvern

- Bagnères-de-Bigorre, France
- Korosten, Ukraine
- Mariánské Lázně, Czech Republic

Manchester

- Chemnitz, Germany
- Wuhan, China

Mansfield

- Heiligenhaus, Germany
- Mansfield, Massachusetts, United States
- Mansfield, Ohio, United States
- Stryi, Ukraine

March

- Saint-Jean-de-Braye, France

Margate

- Idar-Oberstein, Germany
- Les Mureaux, France
- Yalta, Ukraine

Marlow

- Budavár (Budapest), Hungary
- Marly-le-Roi, France

Matlock

- Eaubonne, France

Medway

- Cádiz, Spain
- Chancheng (Foshan), China
- Itō, Japan
- Valenciennes, France
- Yokosuka, Japan

Merton

- Irving, United States

Middlesbrough

- Dunkirk, France
- Oberhausen, Germany

Midsomer Norton

- Ambarès-et-Lagrave, France

Mildenhall

- Luc-sur-Mer, France

Minehead

- Saint-Berthevin, France

Moretonhampstead

- Betton, France

Mossley

- Hem, France

Much Wenlock

- Cysoing, France

== N ==
Nantwich

- Bischofsheim, Germany
- Dzierżoniów, Poland
- Mâcon, France

Narborough

- Genappe, Belgium

New Mills

- Alsfeld, Germany

Newark-on-Trent

- Emmendingen, Germany
- Saint-Cyr-Sur-Loire, France
- Sandomierz, Poland

Newbiggin by the Sea

- Remscheid, Germany

Newburgh

- Newburgh, United States

Newbury

- Bagnols-sur-Cèze, France
- Braunfels, Germany
- Carcaixent, Spain
- Eeklo, Belgium
- Feltre, Italy

Newcastle upon Tyne

- Atlanta, United States
- Bergen, Norway
- Gelsenkirchen, Germany
- Groningen, Netherlands
- Haifa, Israel
- Little Rock, United States
- Nancy, France
- Taiyuan, China

Newham

- Kaiserslautern, Germany

Newhaven

- La Chapelle-Saint-Mesmin, France

Newick

- Itteville, France

Newmarket

- Lexington, United States
- Maisons-Laffitte, France
- Le Mesnil-le-Roi, France

Newquay

- Dinard, France

Newton Abbot

- Aÿ-Champagne, France
- Besigheim, Germany

North East Derbyshire

- Darmstadt-Dieburg (district), Germany

North Tyneside

- Halluin, France
- Klaipėda, Lithuania
- Mönchengladbach, Germany
- Oer-Erkenschwick, Germany

Northampton

- Marburg, Germany
- Poitiers, France

Northiam

- Calonne-sur-la-Lys, France

Norwich

- Koblenz, Germany
- Novi Sad, Serbia
- Rouen, France
- El Viejo, Nicaragua

Nottingham

- Ghent, Belgium
- Harare, Zimbabwe
- Karlsruhe, Germany
- Ningbo, China
- Timișoara, Romania
- Września, Poland

Nuneaton and Bedworth

- Cottbus, Germany
- Guadalajara, Spain
- Roanne, France

== O ==
Oadby and Wigston

- Maromme, France
- Norderstedt, Germany

Oakham

- Barmstedt, Germany
- Dodgeville, United States

Oldham

- Kranj, Slovenia

Olveston

- Bréhan, France

Oswestry

- Combs-la-Ville, France

Oxford

- Bonn (Bonn), Germany
- Grenoble, France
- Leiden, Netherlands
- León, Nicaragua
- Padua, Italy
- Ramallah, Palestine
- Wrocław, Poland

== P ==
Patchway

- Gauting, Germany

Peacehaven

- Épinay-sous-Sénart, France
- Isernhagen, Germany

Pendle

- Creil, France
- Marl, Germany

Penistone

- Grindavík, Iceland

Penrith

- Penrith, Australia

Penryn

- Audierne, France

Penzance

- Concarneau, France
- Cuxhaven, Germany
- Greater Bendigo, Australia
- Nevada City, United States

Peterborough

- Alcalá de Henares, Spain
- Bourges, France
- Forlì, Italy
- Viersen, Germany
- Vinnytsia, Ukraine

Peterlee

- Nordenham, Germany

Petersfield

- Barentin, France
- Warendorf, Germany

Plymouth

- Brest, France
- Gdynia, Poland
- Plymouth, United States
- San Sebastián, Spain

Polegate

- Appen, Germany
- Saintry-sur-Seine, France

Poole

- Cherbourg-en-Cotentin, France

Porthleven

- Guissény, France

Portishead

- Schweich, Germany

Portsmouth

- Caen, France
- Duisburg, Germany
- Falkland Islands
- Haifa, Israel
- Halifax, Canada
- Maizuru, Japan
- Portsmouth, United States
- Sydney, Australia
- Sylhet, Bangladesh
- Zhanjiang, China

Potters Bar

- Franconville, France
- Viernheim, Germany

Poynton

- Érd, Hungary
- Haybes, France

Preston

- Almelo, Netherlands
- Kalisz, Poland
- Nîmes, France
- Recklinghausen, Germany

Pucklechurch

- Pringy, France

== R ==
Radcliffe-on-Trent

- Bussy-Saint-Georges, France

Ramsgate

- Chimay, Belgium
- Conflans-Sainte-Honorine, France
- Frederikssund, Denmark

Reading

- Clonmel, Ireland
- Düsseldorf, Germany
- San Francisco Libre, Nicaragua
- Speightstown, Barbados

Redcar and Cleveland

- Troisdorf, Germany

Redditch

- Auxerre, France
- Gruchet-le-Valasse, France
- Gujar Khan, Pakistan
- Mtwara, Tanzania
- Saint Elizabeth, Jamaica

Redruth

- Mineral del Monte, Mexico
- Mineral Point, United States
- Plumergat, France

Reigate and Banstead

- Brunoy, France
- Eschweiler, Germany

Richmond upon Thames

- Fontainebleau, France
- Konstanz, Germany
- Richmond, United States

Ringwood

- Pont-Audemer, France

Rochdale

- Bielefeld, Germany
- Lviv, Ukraine
- Sahiwal, Pakistan
- Tourcoing, France

Romsey

- Battenberg, Germany
- Paimpol, France
- Treviglio, Italy

Rossendale

- Bocholt, Germany

Rotherfield

- Saint-Chéron, France

Rotherham

- Cluj-Napoca, Romania
- Riesa, Germany
- Saint-Quentin, France
- Zabrze, Poland

Rothwell

- Droué, France

Royal Leamington Spa

- Brühl, Germany
- Heemstede, Netherlands
- Sceaux, France

Royal Tunbridge Wells

- Wiesbaden, Germany

Ruddington

- Grenay, France

Rugby

- Évreux, France
- Rüsselsheim am Main, Germany

Runnymede

- Bergisch Gladbach, Germany
- Herndon, United States
- Joinville-le-Pont, France

Rushmoor

- Dayton, United States
- Gorkha, Nepal
- Meudon, France
- Oberursel, Germany
- Rzeszów, Poland
- Sulechów, Poland

Rustington

- Künzell, Germany
- Los Altos, United States

Rye

- Rye, United States

== S ==
=== Sa–Se ===
Salford

- Clermont-Ferrand, France
- Lünen, Germany
- Narbonne, France
- Saint-Ouen-sur-Seine, France

Salisbury

- Saintes, France
- Salisbury, Maryland, United States
- Salisbury, North Carolina, United States
- Xanten, Germany

Saltash

- Plougastel-Daoulas, France

Sandwell

- Amritsar, India
- Le Blanc-Mesnil, France

Sandwich

- Honfleur, France
- Ronse, Belgium
- Sonsbeck, Germany

Sandy

- Malaunay, France
- Skarszewy, Poland

Sawtry

- Weimar, Germany

Scarborough

- Cahir, Ireland

Scunthorpe

- Clamart, France
- Lüneburg, Germany
- Ostrowiec Świętokrzyski, Poland

Seaford

- Bönningstedt, Germany
- Crivitz, Germany

Seaham

- Gerlingen, Germany

Sedbergh

- Zreče, Slovenia

Sefton

- Gdańsk, Poland
- Mons, Belgium

Selby

- Carentan-les-Marais, France
- Filderstadt, Germany

Sevenoaks

- Pontoise, France
- Rheinbach, Germany

=== Sh–Sn ===
Shaftesbury

- Brionne, France
- Lindlar, Germany

Sheffield

- Anshan, China
- Bochum, Germany
- Chengdu, China
- Donetsk, Ukraine
- Estelí, Nicaragua
- Khmelnytskyi, Ukraine
- Kitwe, Zambia
- Pittsburgh, United States

Shepshed

- Domont, France
- Kotturu, India

Shepton Mallet

- Bollnäs, Sweden
- Oissel, France

Sherborne is a member of the Douzelage, a town twinning association of towns across the European Union, alongside:

- Agros, Cyprus
- Altea, Spain
- Asikkala, Finland
- Bad Kötzting, Germany
- Bellagio, Italy
- Bundoran, Ireland
- Chojna, Poland
- Granville, France
- Holstebro, Denmark
- Houffalize, Belgium
- Judenburg, Austria
- Kőszeg, Hungary
- Marsaskala, Malta
- Meerssen, Netherlands
- Niederanven, Luxembourg
- Oxelösund, Sweden
- Preveza, Greece
- Rokiškis, Lithuania
- Rovinj, Croatia
- Sesimbra, Portugal
- Sigulda, Latvia
- Siret, Romania
- Škofja Loka, Slovenia
- Sušice, Czech Republic
- Tryavna, Bulgaria
- Türi, Estonia
- Zvolen, Slovakia

Sheringham

- Muzillac, France
- Otterndorf, Germany

Shrivenham

- Mortrée, France

Sidmouth

- Le Locle, Switzerland

Silkstone

- Rives de l'Yon, France

Skegness

- Bad Gandersheim, Germany

Sleaford

- Fredersdorf-Vogelsdorf, Germany
- Marquette-lez-Lille, France

Snodland

- Moyeuvre-Grande, France

=== So–Sp ===
Solihull

- Changzhou, China
- Cholet, France
- Main-Taunus (district), Germany

Somerton

- Licciana Nardi, Italy
- Sillé-le-Guillaume, France

South Ribble

- Schleswig-Flensburg (district), Germany

South Tyneside

- Épinay-sur-Seine, France
- Noisy-le-Sec, France
- Wuppertal, Germany

Southam

- Marolles-en-Hurepoix, France

Southampton

- Hampton, United States
- Miami-Dade County, United States
- Qingdao, China
- Rems-Murr (district), Germany
- Trieste, Italy

Southend-on-Sea

- Sopot, Poland

Southwark

- Clichy, France
- Langenhagen, Germany

Spalding

- Sézanne, France

Spelthorne

- Grand Port, Mauritius
- Melun, France

=== St ===
St Albans

- Fano, Italy
- Nevers, France
- Nyíregyháza, Hungary
- Odense, Denmark
- Worms, Germany

St Buryan

- Calan, France

St Erth

- Ploulec'h, France

St Germans

- Plouguerneau, France

St Helens

- Chalon-sur-Saône, France
- Stuttgart, Germany

St Ives, Cambridgeshire

- Stadtallendorf, Germany

St Ives, Cornwall

- Camaret-sur-Mer, France
- Laguna Beach, United States

St Just in Penwith

- Huelgoat, France

St Neot

- Malguénac, France

St Neots

- Faches-Thumesnil, France

Stafford

- Belfort, France
- Dreieich, Germany
- Skarżysko-Kamienna, Poland
- Stafford County, United States
- Tarragona, Spain

Stalybridge

- Armentières, France

Stamford

- Kutná Hora, Czech Republic
- Vence, France

Stapleford

- Villedômer, France

Stevenage

- Autun, France
- Ingelheim am Rhein, Germany
- Kadoma, Zimbabwe
- Shymkent, Kazakhstan

Stithians

- Ploërdut, France

Stockport

- Béziers, France
- Heilbronn, Germany

Stockton-on-Tees

- Asnières-sur-Seine, France

Stoke-on-Trent

- East Liverpool, United States
- Erlangen, Germany

Stourport-on-Severn

- Villeneuve-le-Roi, France

Stowmarket

- Verneuil d'Avre et d'Iton, France

Stratford-upon-Avon

- Stratford (Wellington), Australia
- Stratford, Ontario, Canada
- Stratford, Prince Edward Island, Canada
- Stratford, New Zealand
- Stratford, United States

Street

- Isny im Allgäu, Germany
- Port-Jérôme-sur-Seine, France

=== Su–Sy ===
Sudbury

- Clermont, France
- Fredensborg, Denmark
- Höxter, Germany

Sunderland

- Essen, Germany
- Harbin, China
- Saint-Nazaire, France
- Washington, D.C., United States

Surrey Heath

- Bietigheim-Bissingen, Germany
- Sucy-en-Brie, France

Sutton

- Charlottenburg-Wilmersdorf (Berlin), Germany
- Gagny, France
- Gladsaxe, Denmark
- Minden, Germany

Swaffham

- Hemmoor, Germany
- Valence-en-Poitou, France

Swainswick

- Cressy-sur-Somme, France

Swindon

- Ocotal, Nicaragua
- Salzgitter, Germany
- Toruń, Poland

Syston

- Déville-lès-Rouen, France

== T ==
Tameside

- Bengbu, China

Tamworth

- Bad Laasphe, Germany
- Tamworth, Australia
- Vaujours, France

Tarporley

- Bohars, France

Taunton

- Königslutter am Elm, Germany
- Lisieux, France
- Taunton, United States

Tavistock

- Celle, Germany
- Pontivy, France

Teignmouth

- Perros-Guirec, France

Tenterden

- Avallon, France

Tendring

- Biberach an der Riss, Germany
- Świdnica, Poland
- Valence, France

Thame

- Montesson, France
- Sinaia, Romania

Thetford

- Amritsar, India
- Hürth, Germany
- Nissewaard, Netherlands
- Skawina, Poland
- Les Ulis, France

Thurmaston

- Offranville, France

Thurrock

- Mönchengladbach, Germany
- Płock, Poland

Tiverton

- Chinon, France
- Hofheim am Taunus, Germany

Todmorden

- Bramsche, Germany
- Roncq, France

Tonbridge and Malling

- Heusenstamm, Germany
- Le Puy-en-Velay, France

Torbay

- Hamelin, Germany

Torpoint

- Bénodet, France

Totnes

- Vire-Normandie, France

Tower Hamlets

- Offenbach am Main, Germany

Trowbridge

- Charenton-le-Pont, France
- Elbląg, Poland
- Leer, Germany
- Oujda, Morocco

Truro

- Boppard, Germany
- Morlaix, France

Twyford

- Cuincy, France

== U ==
Uckfield

- Arques-la-Bataille, France
- Quickborn, Germany

Ulverston

- Albert, France

Upchurch

- Ferques, France

Uppingham

- Rives-en-Seine, France

== V ==
Vale of White Horse

- Colmar, France

Verwood

- Liederbach am Taunus, Germany
- Orée-d'Anjou, France

== W ==
=== Wa ===
Wadebridge

- Langueux, France

Wadhurst

- Aubers, France

Wakefield

- Alfeld, Germany
- Castres, France
- Castrop-Rauxel, Germany
- Hénin-Beaumont, France
- Herne, Germany
- Konin, Poland

Wallingford

- Bad Wurzach, Germany
- Luxeuil-les-Bains, France

Walsall

- Kobar, Palestine
- Mulhouse, France

Waltham Forest

- Roseau, Dominica
- Saint-Mandé, France
- St. John's, Antigua and Barbuda
- Wandsbek (Hamburg), Germany

Wantage

- Mably, France
- Seesen, Germany

Ware

- Cormeilles-en-Parisis, France
- Wülfrath, Germany

Warminster

- Flers, France
- Warminster Township, United States

Warrington

- Červený Kostelec, Czech Republic
- Česká Skalice, Czech Republic
- Hilden, Germany
- Hronov, Czech Republic
- Jaroměř, Czech Republic
- Náchod, Czech Republic
- Nové Město nad Metují, Czech Republic

Warwick

- Saumur, France
- Verden an der Aller, Germany

Waterlooville

- Henstedt-Ulzburg, Germany
- Maurepas, France

Watford

- Mainz, Germany
- Nanterre, France
- Pesaro, Italy
- Veliky Novgorod, Russia

=== We–Wh ===
Wellingborough

- Niort, France
- Wittlich, Germany

Wellington, Shropshire

- Châtenay-Malabry, France

Wellington, Somerset

- Torres Vedras, Portugal

Wells

- Bad Dürkheim, Germany
- Fontanellato, Italy
- Paray-le-Monial, France

Welton

- Moncé-en-Belin, France

West Hendred

- Sarceaux, France

West Lancashire

- Cergy, France
- Pontoise, France
- Erkrath, Germany

Westerham

- Bonneval, France

Weston-super-Mare

- Hildesheim, Germany

Weymouth

- Holzwickede, Germany
- Louviers, France

Whaley Bridge

- Tymbark, Poland

Wheaton Aston

- Wheaton, United States

Whitby

- Anchorage, United States
- Bland, Australia
- Cook, Australia
- East Fremantle, Australia
- Kauai County, United States
- Nukuʻalofa, Tonga
- Porirua, New Zealand
- Stanley, Falkland Islands
- Whitby, Canada
- Whitianga (Thames-Coromandel), New Zealand

Whitstable

- Albertslund, Denmark
- Borken, Germany
- Dainville, France
- Grabow, Germany
- Říčany, Czech Republic

Whitworth

- Kandel, Germany

=== Wi–Wo ===
Wigan

- Angers, France

Wilbarston

- Weinähr, Germany

Willenhall

- Drancy, France

Wimborne Minster

- Ochsenfurt, Germany
- Valognes, France

Wincanton

- Gennes-Val-de-Loire, France
- Lahnau, Germany

Winchester

- Laon, France
- Nizhyn, Ukraine

Winchester (local government district)

- Giessen, Germany

Windermere

- Dießen am Ammersee, Germany

Windsor and Maidenhead

- Bad Godesberg (Bonn), Germany
- Frascati, Italy
- Goslar, Germany
- Kortrijk, Belgium
- Neuilly-sur-Seine, France
- Saint-Cloud, France

Winsford

- Deuil-la-Barre, France

Winster

- Monterubbiano, Italy

Wirksworth

- Die, France
- Frankenau, Germany

Wirral

- Gennevilliers, France
- Lorient, France
- Midland, United States
- Reno, United States
- Taicang, China

Wisbech

- Arles, France

Witham

- Waldbröl, Germany

Witney

- Le Touquet-Paris-Plage, France
- Unterhaching, Germany

Woking

- Le Plessis-Robinson, France
- Rastatt, Germany

Wokingham

- Erftstadt, Germany
- Viry-Châtillon, France

Worcester

- Kleve, Germany
- Ukmergė, Lithuania
- Le Vésinet, France
- Worcester, United States

Workington

- Selm, Germany
- Val-de-Reuil, France

Worthing

- Elzach, Germany
- Gutach im Breisgau, Germany
- Les Sables-d'Olonne, France
- Simonswald, Germany
- Waldkirch, Germany

== Y ==
Yarm

- Schwalbach am Taunus, Germany
- Vernouillet, France

Yate

- Bad Salzdetfurth, Germany

Yeovil

- Herblay-sur-Seine, France
- Samarate, Italy
- Taunusstein, Germany

York

- Dijon, France
- Münster, Germany
- Nanjing, China
