= La Chapelle-Saint-Sauveur =

La Chapelle-Saint-Sauveur may refer to:

- La Chapelle-Saint-Sauveur, Loire-Atlantique, a commune in the French region of Pays-de-la-Loire
- La Chapelle-Saint-Sauveur, Saône-et-Loire, a commune in the French region of Bourgogne
