= La Rouxière =

- Part of Loireauxence
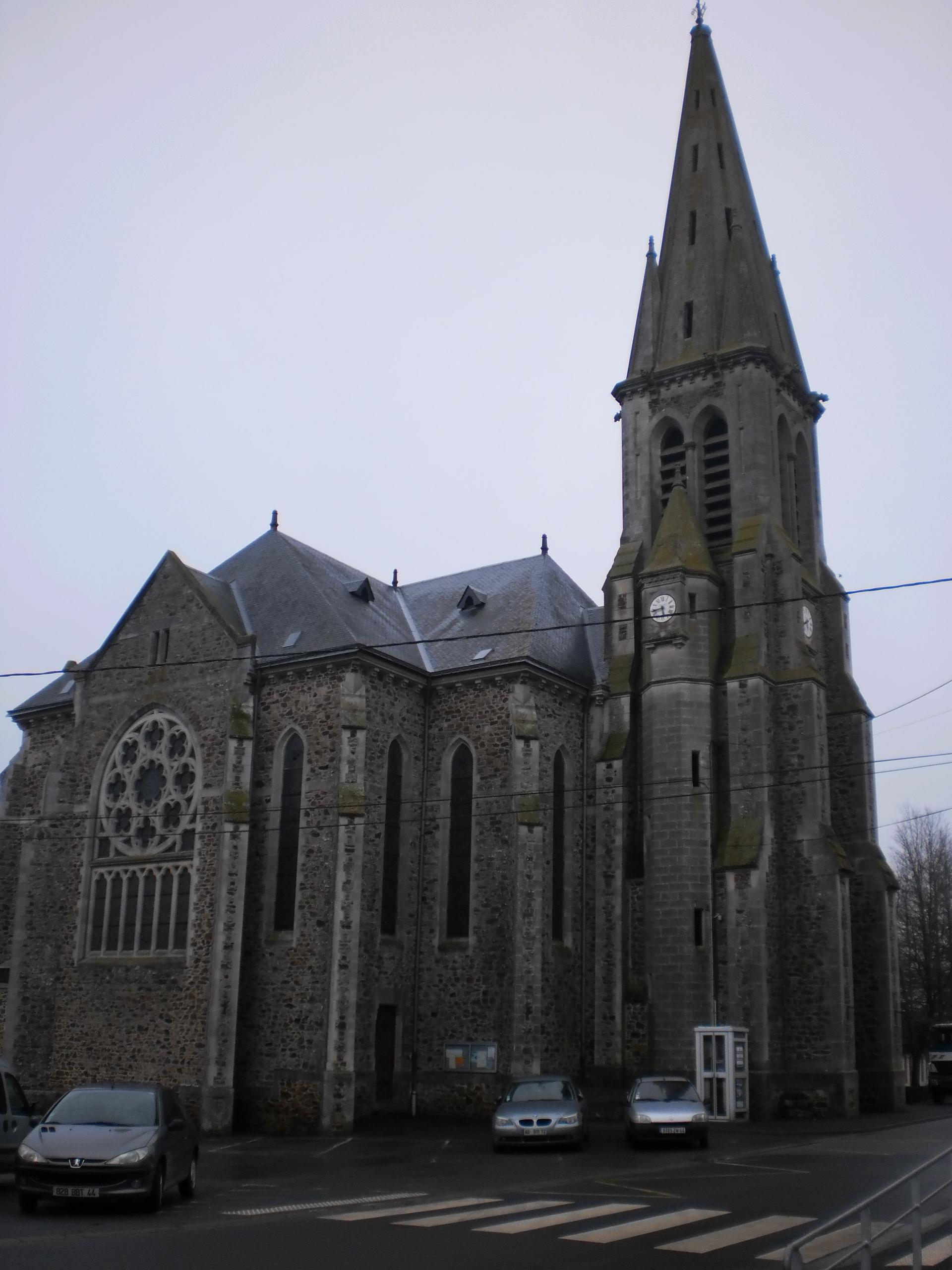
- The church in La Rouxière

- Coat of arms
- Location of La Rouxière
- Location within France Location within Pays de la Loire
- Coordinates: 47°26′37″N 1°03′59″W
- Country: France
- Region: Pays de la Loire
- Department: Loire-Atlantique
- Arrondissement: Châteaubriant-Ancenis
- Canton: Ancenis-Saint-Géréon
- Commune: Loireauxence
- Area^{1}: 20.96 km^{2} (8.09 sq mi)
- Highest elevation: 78 m (256 ft)
- Lowest elevation: 23 m (75 ft)
- Population (2022): 1,166
  - Density: 55.63/km^{2} (144.1/sq mi)
- Demonym(s): Rouxièroises, Rouxièrois
- Time zone: UTC+01:00 (CET)
  - Summer (DST): UTC+02:00 (CEST)
- Postal code: 44370
- Website: www.communelarouxiere.com
- ^{1} French Land Register data, which excludes lakes, ponds, glaciers > 1 km^{2} (0.386 sq mi or 247 acres) and river estuaries.

La Rouxière (French pronunciation: [la ʁuksjɛʁ]; Breton: Kerrouz) is a former commune in the Loire-Atlantique department in western France. On 1 January 2016, it was merged into the new commune of Loireauxence.

== See also ==
- Communes of the Loire-Atlantique department
