= Varades =

- Part of Loireauxence
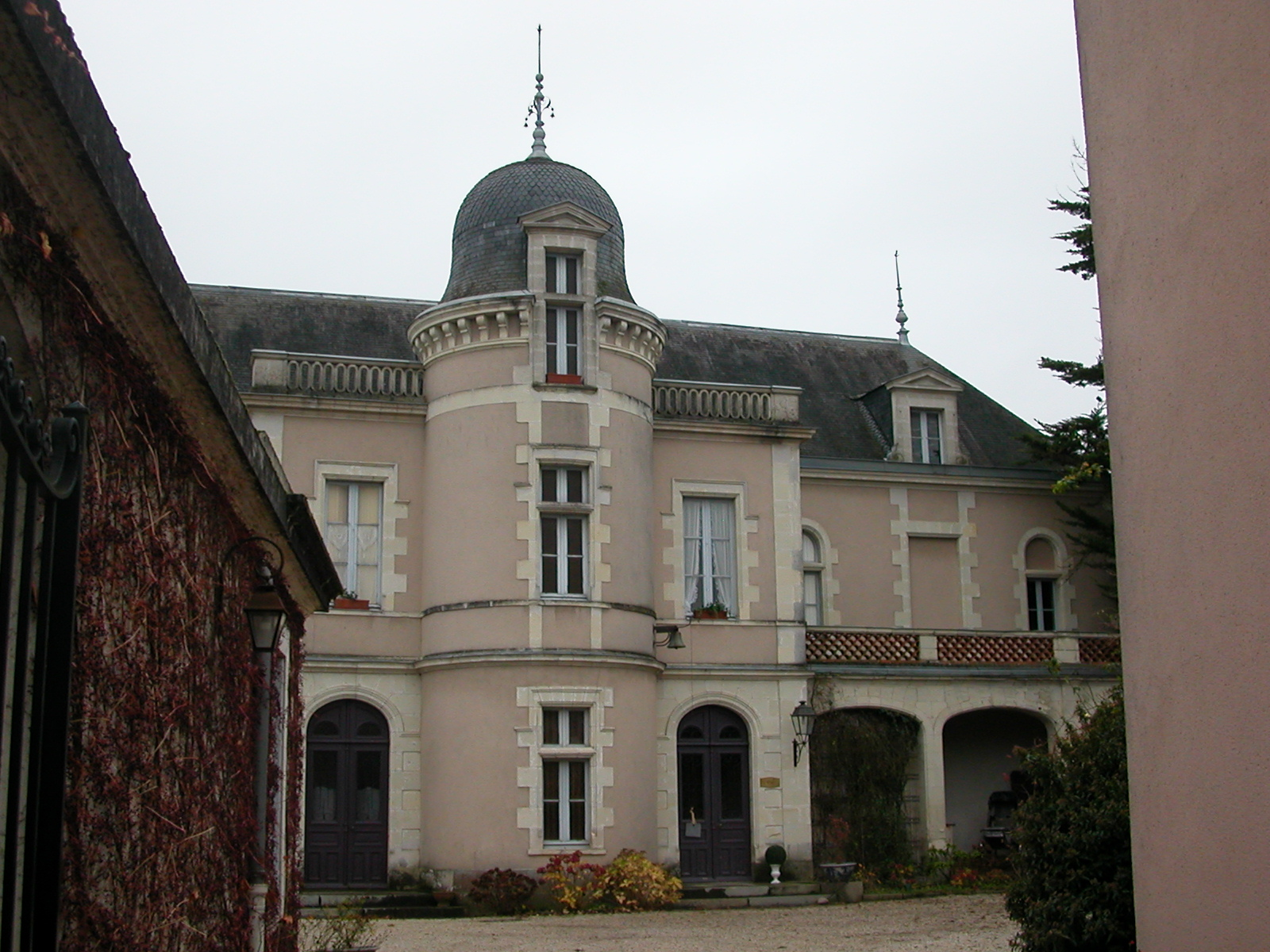
- The château in Varades

- Coat of arms
- Location of Varades
- Location within France Location within Pays de la Loire
- Coordinates: 47°23′07″N 1°01′44″W
- Country: France
- Region: Pays de la Loire
- Department: Loire-Atlantique
- Arrondissement: Châteaubriant-Ancenis
- Canton: Ancenis-Saint-Géréon
- Commune: Loireauxence
- Area^{1}: 45.82 km^{2} (17.69 sq mi)
- Highest elevation: 74 m (243 ft)
- Lowest elevation: 7 m (23 ft)
- Population (2022): 3,721
  - Density: 81.21/km^{2} (210.3/sq mi)
- Demonym(s): Varadaises, Varadais
- Time zone: UTC+01:00 (CET)
  - Summer (DST): UTC+02:00 (CEST)
- Postal code: 44370
- Website: www.varades.fr
- ^{1} French Land Register data, which excludes lakes, ponds, glaciers > 1 km^{2} (0.386 sq mi or 247 acres) and river estuaries.

Varades (French pronunciation: [vaʁad]; Breton: Gwared) is a former commune in the Loire-Atlantique department in western France. On 1 January 2016, it was merged into the new commune of Loireauxence.

== Twinning ==
Varades has since August 2009 been twinned with the small Welsh/English border town of Knighton.

== See also ==
- Communes of the Loire-Atlantique department
