= Belligné =

- Part of Loireauxence
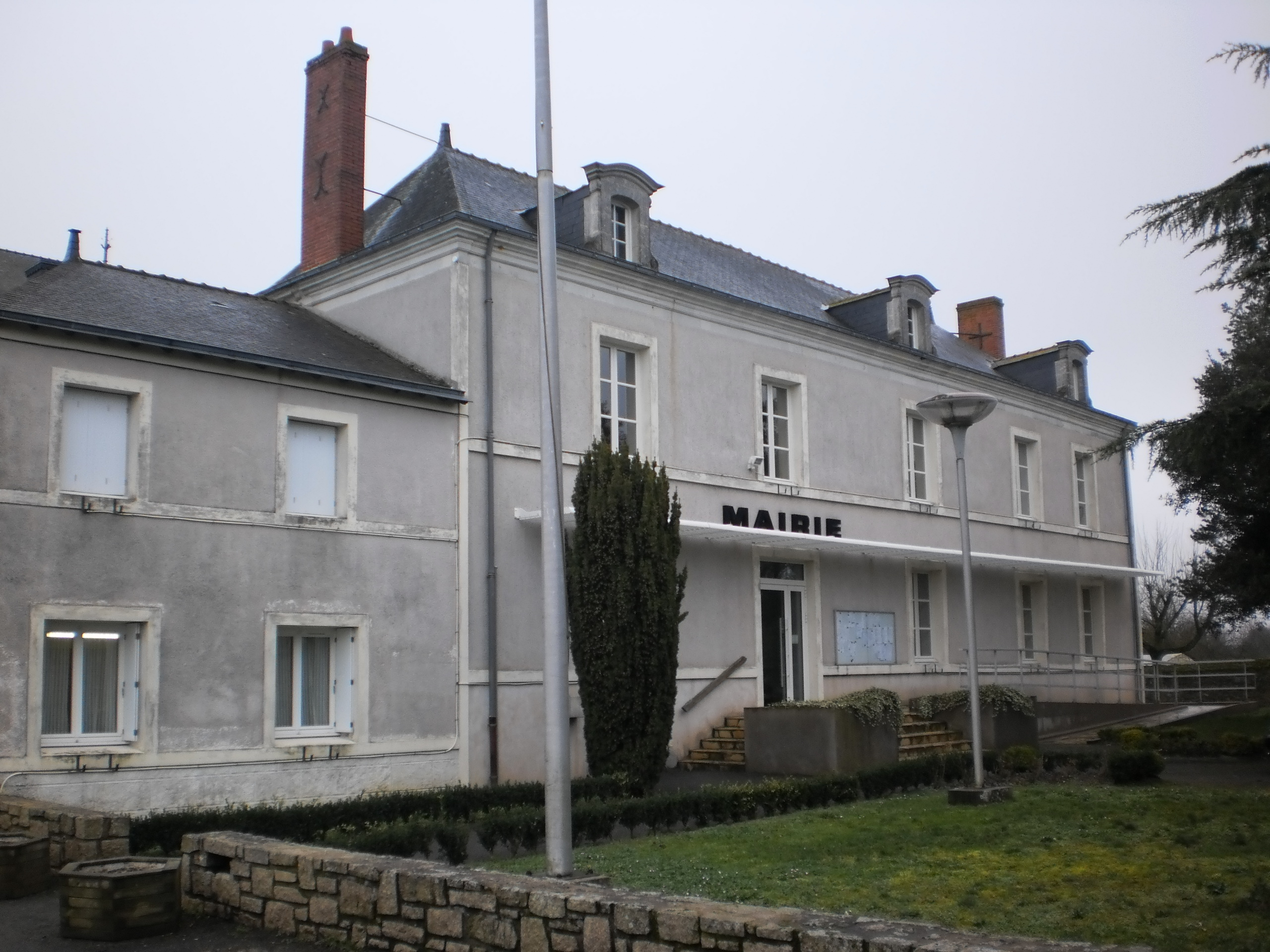
- The town hall in Belligné

- Coat of arms
- Location of Belligné
- Location within France Location within Pays de la Loire
- Coordinates: 47°28′06″N 1°01′36″W
- Country: France
- Region: Pays de la Loire
- Department: Loire-Atlantique
- Arrondissement: Châteaubriant-Ancenis
- Canton: Ancenis-Saint-Géréon
- Commune: Loireauxence
- Area^{1}: 32.8 km^{2} (12.7 sq mi)
- Highest elevation: 94 m (308 ft)
- Lowest elevation: 47 m (154 ft)
- Population (2022): 1,803
  - Density: 55.0/km^{2} (142/sq mi)
- Time zone: UTC+01:00 (CET)
  - Summer (DST): UTC+02:00 (CEST)
- Postal code: 44370
- ^{1} French Land Register data, which excludes lakes, ponds, glaciers > 1 km^{2} (0.386 sq mi or 247 acres) and river estuaries.

Belligné (French pronunciation: [bɛliɲe]; Breton: Belenieg) is a former commune in the Loire-Atlantique department in western France. On 1 January 2016, it was merged into the new commune of Loireauxence.

== Population ==
Historical population

Year	Pop.	±% p.a.
1793	2,200	—
1800	1,624	−4.24%
1806	1,976	+3.32%
1821	2,102	+0.41%
1831	2,163	+0.29%
1841	2,047	−0.55%
1846	2,077	+0.29%
1851	2,204	+1.19%
1856	2,225	+0.19%
1861	2,227	+0.02%
1866	2,237	+0.09%
1872	2,221	−0.12%
1876	2,297	+0.84%
1881	2,280	−0.15%
1886	2,255	−0.22%
1891	2,164	−0.82%
1896	2,099	−0.61%
1901	1,951	−1.45%

Year	Pop.	±% p.a.
1906	1,906	−0.47%
1911	1,887	−0.20%
1921	1,708	−0.99%
1926	1,645	−0.75%
1931	1,647	+0.02%
1936	1,553	−1.17%
1946	1,481	−0.47%
1954	1,462	−0.16%
1962	1,464	+0.02%
1968	1,418	−0.53%
1975	1,292	−1.32%
1982	1,324	+0.35%
1990	1,430	+0.97%
1999	1,451	+0.16%
2006	1,646	+1.82%
2013	1,814	+1.40%
2022	1,803	−0.07%

Source: EHESS and INSEE

== See also ==
- Communes of the Loire-Atlantique department
