= Pinois =

Pinois may refer to:

- Le Pin, Loire-Atlantique inhabitants
- Le Pin, Seine-et-Marne inhabitants
