= La Chapelle-Saint-Sauveur, Loire-Atlantique =

La Chapelle-Saint-Sauveur
- Part of Loireauxence
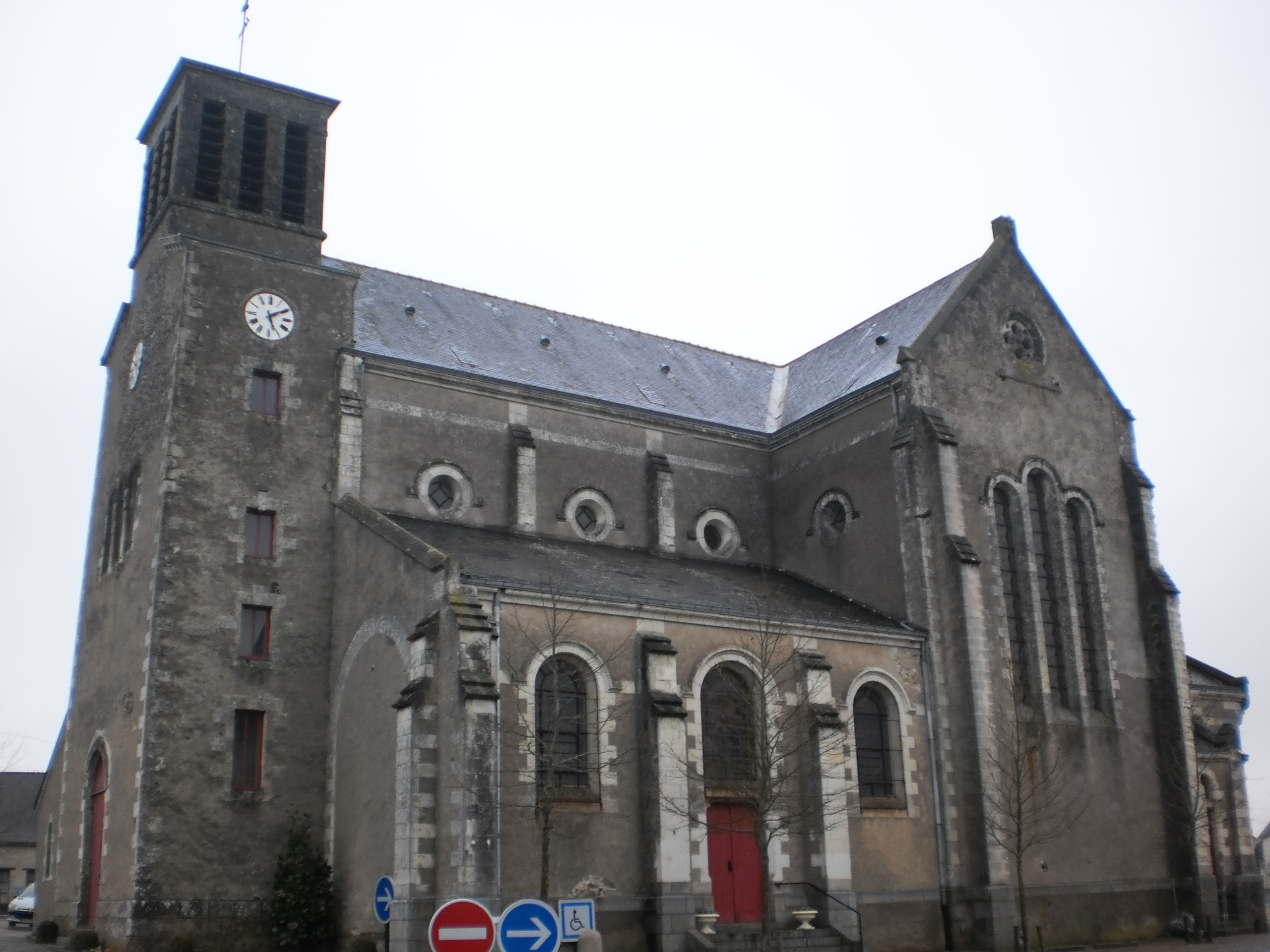
- The church of the Transfiguration, in La Chapelle-Saint-Sauveur

- Coat of arms
- Location of La Chapelle-Saint-Sauveur
- Location within France Location within Pays de la Loire
- Coordinates: 47°26′31″N 0°59′06″W
- Country: France
- Region: Pays de la Loire
- Department: Loire-Atlantique
- Arrondissement: Châteaubriant-Ancenis
- Canton: Ancenis-Saint-Géréon
- Commune: Loireauxence
- Area^{1}: 18.7 km^{2} (7.2 sq mi)
- Highest elevation: 76 m (249 ft)
- Lowest elevation: 32 m (105 ft)
- Population (2022): 819
  - Density: 43.8/km^{2} (113/sq mi)
- Demonym(s): Capellovalsiennes, Capellovalsiens; Chapelloises, Chapellois
- Time zone: UTC+01:00 (CET)
  - Summer (DST): UTC+02:00 (CEST)
- Postal code: 44370
- Website: lachapellesaintsauveur44.fr
- ^{1} French Land Register data, which excludes lakes, ponds, glaciers > 1 km^{2} (0.386 sq mi or 247 acres) and river estuaries.

La Chapelle-Saint-Sauveur (French pronunciation: [la ʃapɛl sɛ̃ sovœʁ]; Breton: Chapel-ar-Salver) is a former commune in the Loire-Atlantique department in western France. On 1 January 2016, it was merged into the new commune of Loireauxence.

== See also ==
- Communes of the Loire-Atlantique department
