= Caraunus =

Christian missionary and saint

Saint Caraunus of Chartres
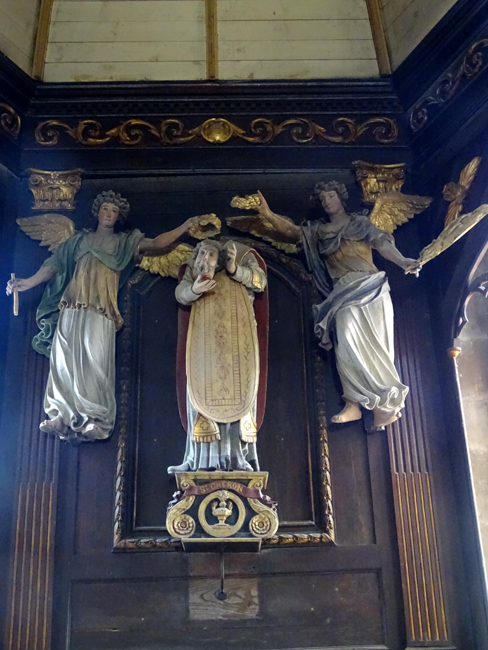
- Statue in the Église Saint-Chéron de Cavan
- Born: 5th century Gaul
- Died: near Chartres
- Venerated in: Chartres
- Feast: 28 May
- Attributes: Priest carrying his head

Saint Caraunus of Chartres (or Caranus, Caro, Chéron) was a 1st or 5th century Christian missionary in Gaul who was murdered by robbers. His feast day is 28 May.

== Life ==
According to legend, Caronus was a Roman of the 1st century A.D. who was a brilliant student in Rome. He converted to Christianity and came via Marseille to Gaul to preach the Christian faith. He was assigned by King Brenn of the Carnutes to a group of three priests sent by Saint Denis to evangelize the south of the Île-de-France. He was assassinated by brigands on the road from Ablis to Chartres on the 5th day before the calends of June in the year 98 A.D. He was canonized in Chartres around 800 A.D. There are doubts about the veracity of this story, which may have been a 9th-century essay by a school pupil asked to write a story about a saint.

Another version says that Caraunus flourished in the 5th century A.D. He was born in Gaul to a Christian family of Roman origin. After his parents died he gave away all his possessions and became a hermit. A bishop ordained him as a deacon, and he became an itinerant preacher. Near Chartres he found a small group of Christians descended from the converts of Saints Potentianus and Altinus. From them he selected disciples to assist him in his preaching, and left for Paris. At a distance of 3 leagues (9 mi; 14 km) from Chartres they encountered a band of robbers. His disciples hid, but the robbers killed him when they found he had nothing of value. He was buried near Chartres, and later an abbey and a church were built over his grave.

== Legacy ==
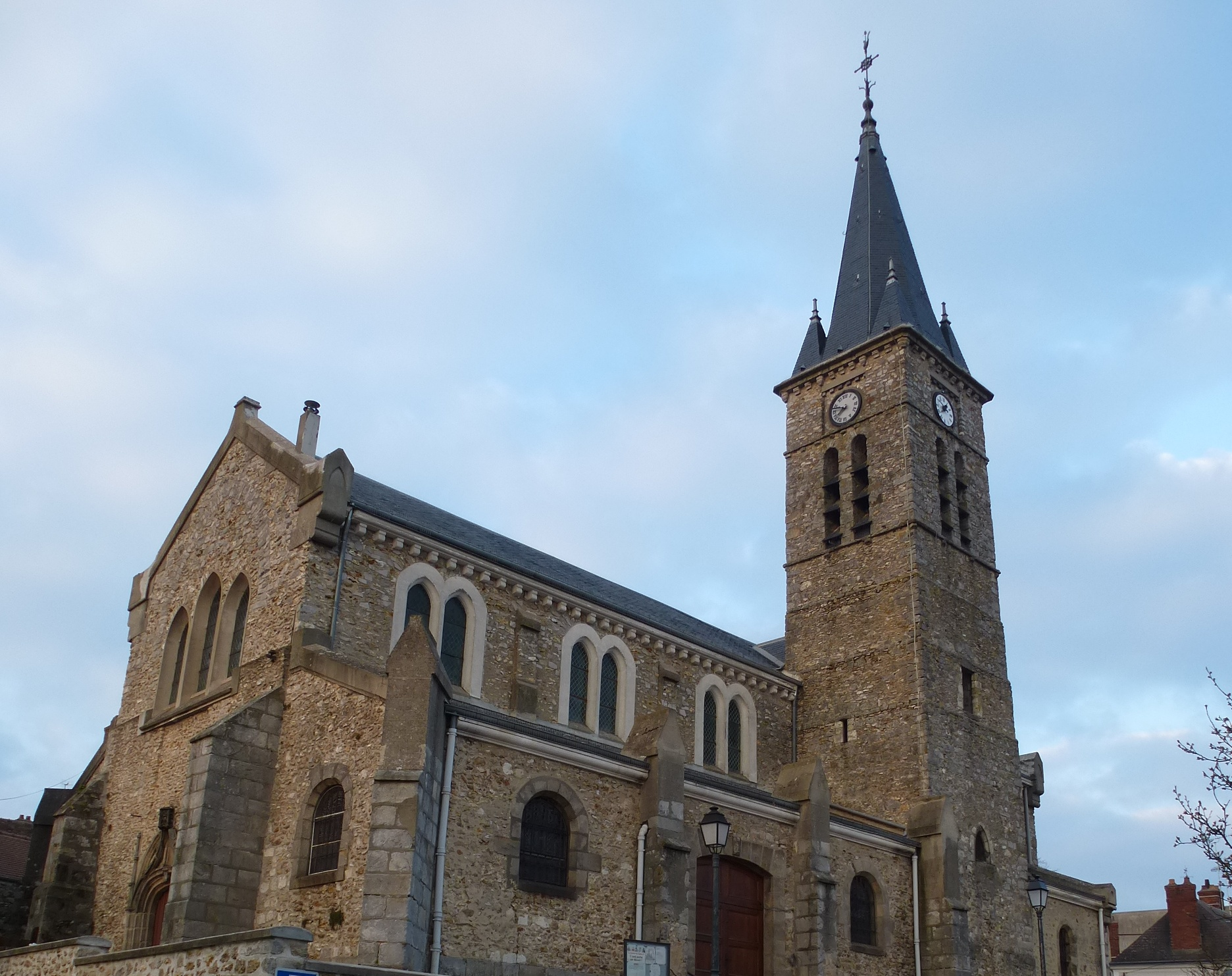
Église Saint-Chéron in Saint-Chéron, Essonne

The town of Saint-Chéron, Essonne, between Chartres and Paris, takes his name. The Stained glass windows of Chartres Cathedral include a stained glass window depicting the history of Saint Chéron in Bay 15. There are eleven rows, each with two panels and border panels with rosettes, florets and interlacing. The lowest row represents the stonemasons, sculptors and donors. The other rows show scenes of the saint's life.

== Attestations ==
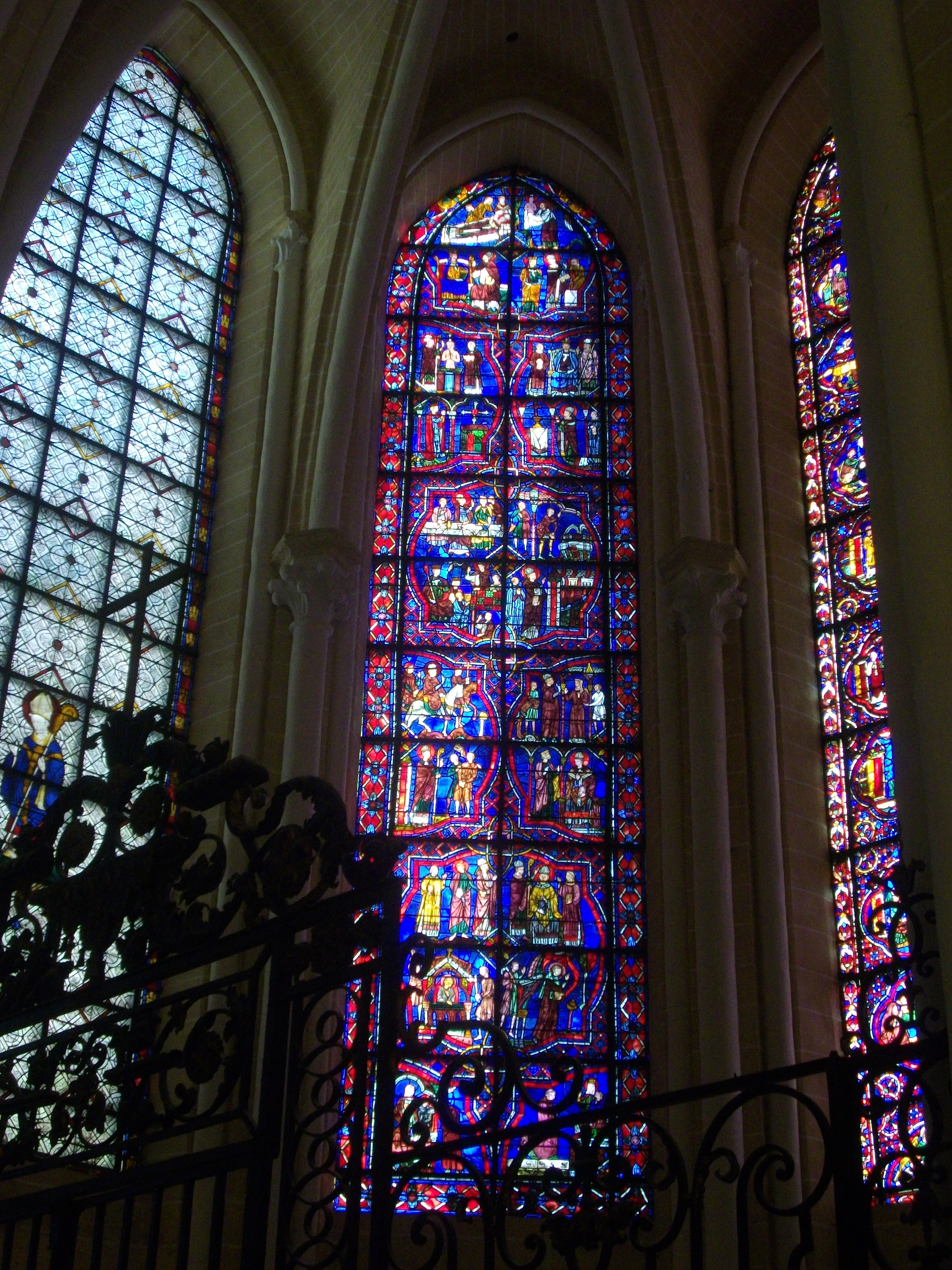
Histoire de saint Chéron in Chartes Cathedral

=== Monks of Ramsgate account ===
The Monks of Ramsgate wrote in their Book of Saints (1921),

CARAUNUS (CHERON) (St.) M. (May 28)
(1st cent.) A Roman by birth who embraced the Christian Faith in the Apostolic Age. The tradition is that he was ordained deacon, and having gone to Gaul as a missionary, suffered martyrdom near Chartres under Domitian (A.D.98).

=== Butler's account ===
The hagiographer Alban Butler (1710–1773) wrote in his Lives of the Fathers, Martyrs, and Other Principal Saints under May 28,

St. Caraunus, called also Caranus, and Caro, in French Cheron, M. He was a native of Gaul, and flourished towards the end of the fifth age. After the death of his parents, who were Christians, he distributed all his substance to the poor; and, in order to serve God with more ease, retired into a desert, where the bishop of the place, discovering his merit, ordained him a deacon.

He then determined to consecrate himself entirely to the ministry of the word; and having preached in several provinces of Gaul, (Note: Gaul was then divided between the Franks, the Burgundians, and the Visigoths. The first were for the most part idolaters, the others professed Arianism, but were scarcely better than infidels.) he came into the territory of Chartrain, where he found but a small number of Christians, the descendants of those who had been formerly converted by St. Potentianus and St. Altinus. (Note: These two saints were sent into this country by St. Savinianus, bishop of Sens, in the reign of the Emperor Dioclesian.) The gospel having made a rapid progress by his zeal, he made choice of some disciples to assist him in extending the knowledge of Jesus Christ; and set out on his way to Paris.

He had scarcely advanced three leagues from Chartres when he perceived a gang of robbers approaching towards him; whereupon he advised his disciples to hide themselves among the thickets while he would amuse the robbers by discoursing with them. These savages, provoked at not finding any money in his possession, fell upon him and inhumanly murdered him. Thus died St. Caraunus, a martyr of charity.

His disciples buried his body near Chartres, upon an eminence which was since called the holy mount; and after some time a church was erected there under his invocation, the care of which was entrusted to a community of ecclesiastics; but the canon regulars were substituted in their room in 1137. The relicks of St. Caraunus are kept in the abbey of his name near Chartres. The president of Lamoignon obtained one bone of them in 1681, for the church which is dedicated to the saint at Mont-couronne, one of the parishes of Baville. His name is mentioned on this day in the Martyrologies; and the feast of his translation is kept at Chartres on the 18th of October. See the Bollandists, t. 6, Maij, p. 748, Baillet, 28 Maij; Gall. Christ. Nov. t. 8, p. 1091, et 1305, the new Paris Breviary, &c.

== Sources ==
- Butler, Alban (1798), The Lives of the Primitive Fathers, Martyrs, and Other Principal Saints, vol. IV, Edinburgh: J. Moir This article incorporates text from this source, which is in the public domain.
- "Les origines du nom", Saint-Chéron (in French), archived from the original on 2021-08-21
- Rabenstein, Katherine I (1998), Saints of the Day – via CatholicSaints.Info
- St. Augustine's Abbey, Ramsgate (1921). The Book of saints : a dictionary of servants of God canonized by the Catholic Church. London: A. & C. Black, ltd. OCLC 671676136. This article incorporates text from this source, which is in the public domain.
- "verrière : Histoire de saint Chéron (baie 15)", POP : la plateforme ouverte du patrimoine (in French)
