= Saint-Chéron, Essonne =

Commune in Île-de-France, France

Saint-Chéron
- Commune
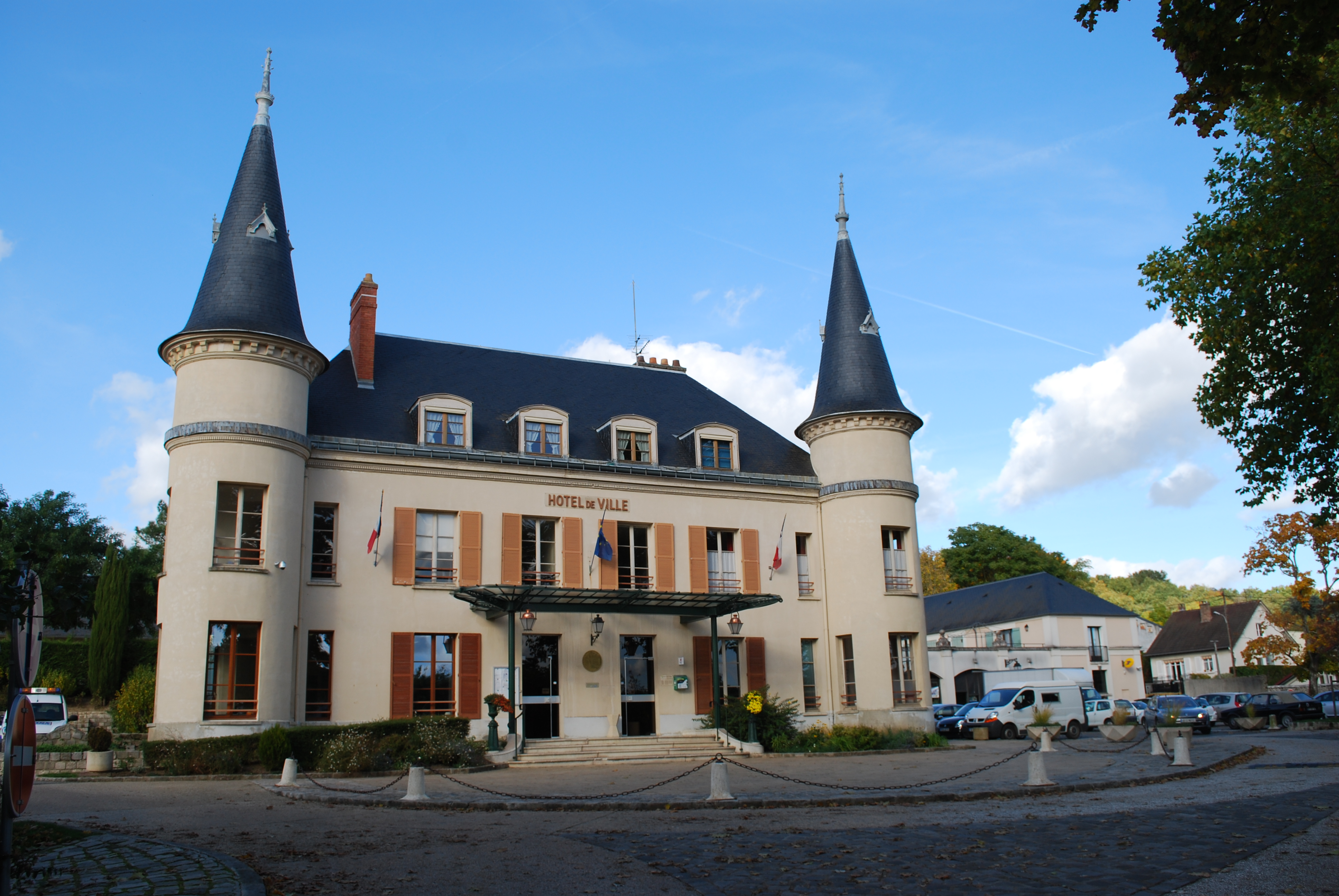
- The town hall in Saint-Chéron

- Coat of arms
- Location of Saint-Chéron
- Location within France Location within Île-de-France (region)
- Coordinates: 48°33′16″N 2°07′27″E
- Country: France
- Region: Île-de-France
- Department: Essonne
- Arrondissement: Étampes
- Canton: Dourdan

Government
  - Mayor (2020–2026): Jean-Marie Gelé
- Area^{1}: 11.44 km^{2} (4.42 sq mi)
- Highest elevation: 159 m (522 ft)
- Lowest elevation: 62 m (203 ft)
- Population (2023): 5,132
  - Density: 448.6/km^{2} (1,162/sq mi)
- Time zone: UTC+01:00 (CET)
  - Summer (DST): UTC+02:00 (CEST)
- INSEE/Postal code: 91540 /91530
- ^{1} French Land Register data, which excludes lakes, ponds, glaciers > 1 km^{2} (0.386 sq mi or 247 acres) and river estuaries.

Saint-Chéron (French pronunciation: [sɛ̃ ʃeʁɔ̃]) is a commune in the Essonne department in Île-de-France in northern France.

The village is named after Saint Caraunus, a missionary who was murdered by robbers in the vicinity.

== Population ==
Inhabitants of Saint-Chéron are known as Saint-Chéronnais in French.

Historical population
| Year | Pop. | ±% p.a. |
|---|---|---|
| 1968 | 2,457 | — |
| 1975 | 3,370 | +4.62% |
| 1982 | 3,550 | +0.75% |
| 1990 | 4,082 | +1.76% |
| 1999 | 4,444 | +0.95% |
| 2007 | 4,796 | +0.96% |
| 2012 | 4,834 | +0.16% |
| 2017 | 5,072 | +0.97% |
| 2023 | 5,132 | +0.20% |
Source: INSEE

== See also ==
- Communes of the Essonne department
