= Loireauxence =

Loireauxence Ligeraosant (Breton)
- Commune
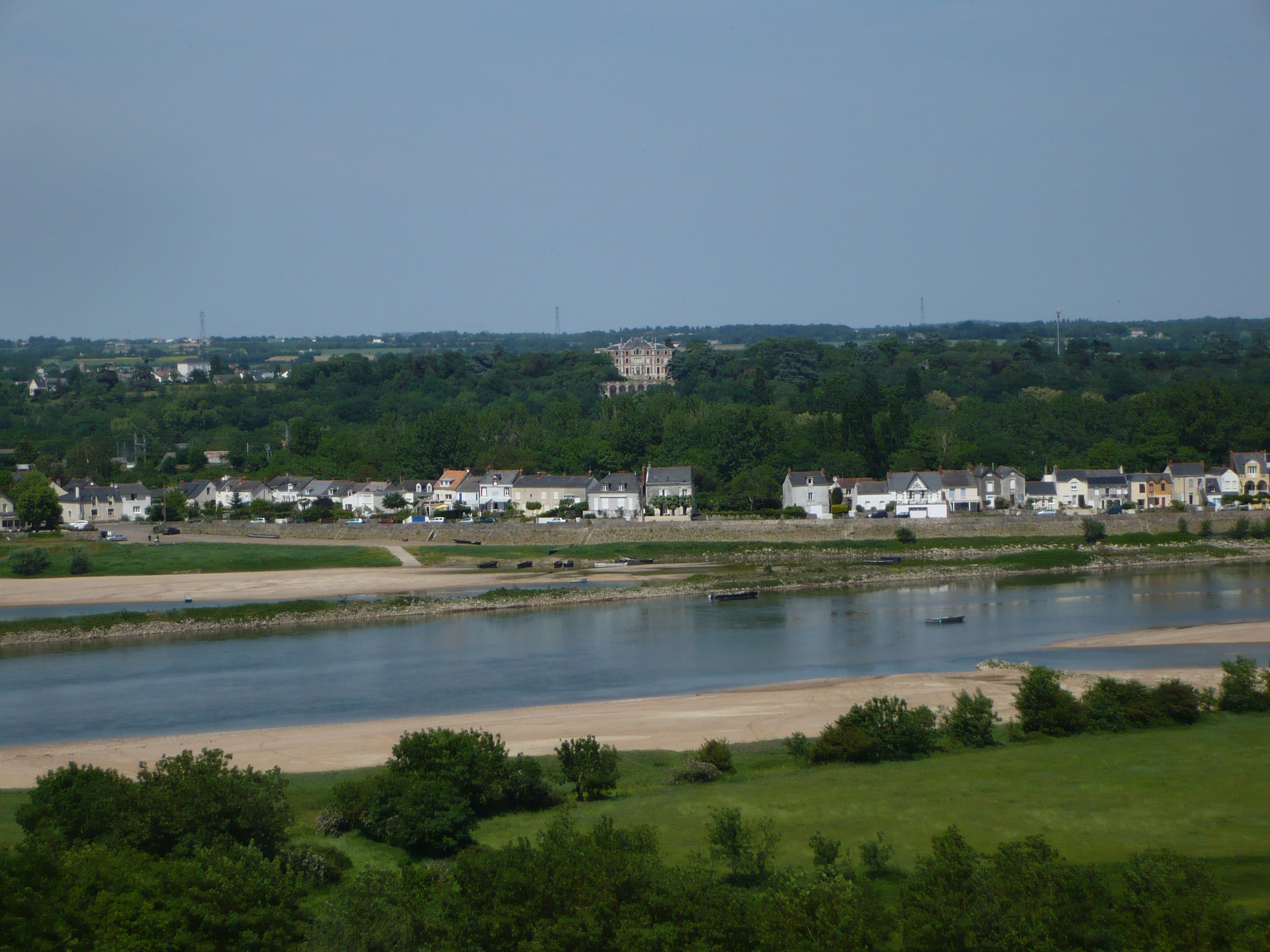
- Loire River and Varades
- Location of Loireauxence
- Location within France Location within Pays de la Loire
- Coordinates: 47°23′10″N 1°01′55″W
- Country: France
- Region: Pays de la Loire
- Department: Loire-Atlantique
- Arrondissement: Châteaubriant-Ancenis
- Canton: Ancenis-Saint-Géréon

Government
  - Mayor (2020–2026): Christine Blanchet
- Area^{1}: 118.28 km^{2} (45.67 sq mi)
- Highest elevation: 94 m (308 ft)
- Lowest elevation: 7 m (23 ft)
- Population (2023): 7,587
  - Density: 64.14/km^{2} (166.1/sq mi)
- Time zone: UTC+01:00 (CET)
  - Summer (DST): UTC+02:00 (CEST)
- INSEE/Postal code: 44213 /44370
- ^{1} French Land Register data, which excludes lakes, ponds, glaciers > 1 km^{2} (0.386 sq mi or 247 acres) and river estuaries.

Loireauxence (French pronunciation: [lwaʁoksɑ̃s]; Breton: Ligeraosant) is a commune in the department of Loire-Atlantique, western France. The municipality was established on 1 January 2016 by merger of the former communes of Varades, Belligné, La Chapelle-Saint-Sauveur and La Rouxière.

== Population ==
Population data refer to the commune in its geography as of January 2025.

Historical population
| Year | Pop. | ±% p.a. |
|---|---|---|
| 1968 | 5,785 | — |
| 1975 | 5,631 | −0.38% |
| 1982 | 5,653 | +0.06% |
| 1990 | 5,860 | +0.45% |
| 1999 | 6,144 | +0.53% |
| 2007 | 6,920 | +1.50% |
| 2012 | 7,204 | +0.81% |
| 2017 | 7,522 | +0.87% |
| 2023 | 7,587 | +0.14% |
Source: INSEE

== See also ==
- Communes of the Loire-Atlantique department
