= Pannecé =

- Commune
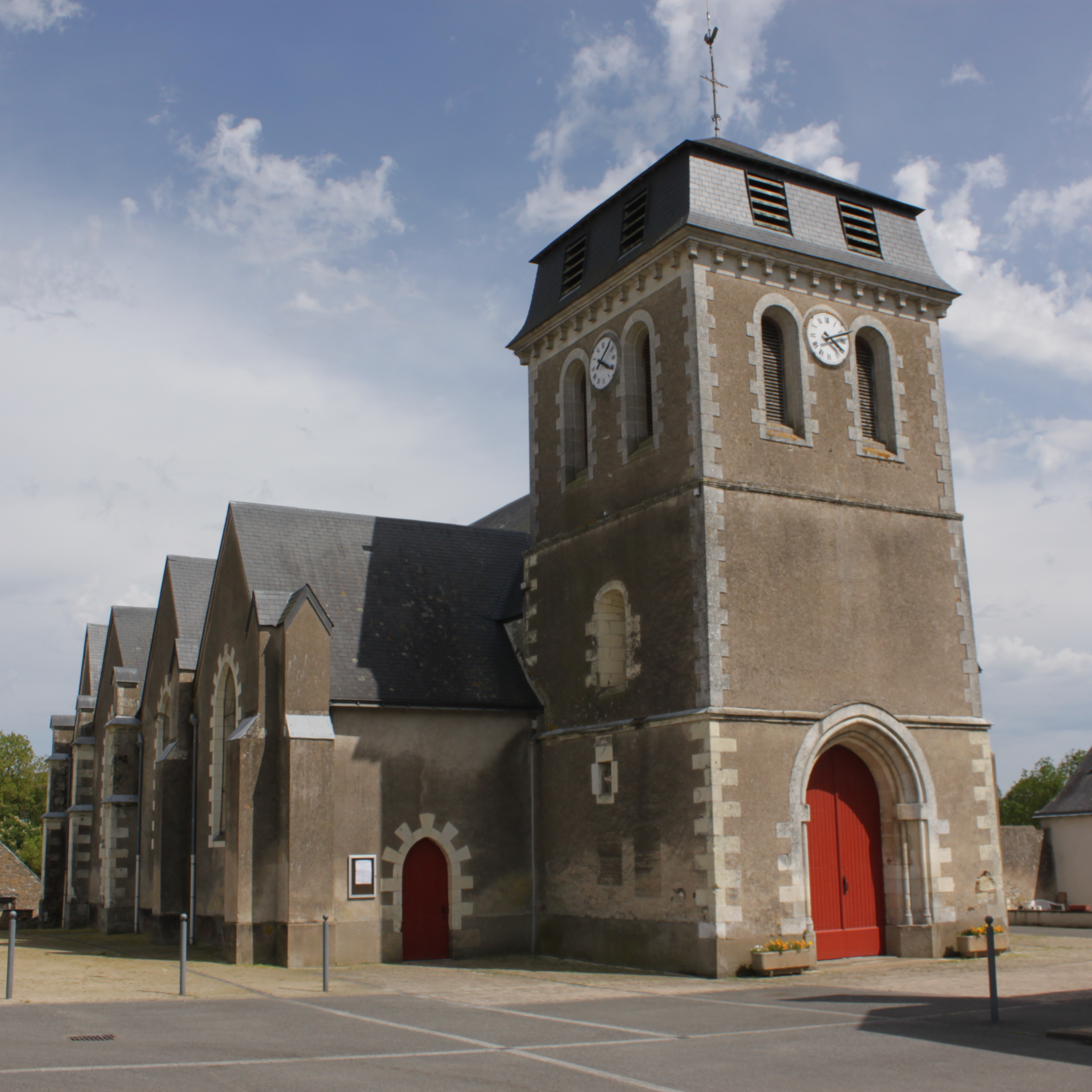
- Location of Pannecé
- Location within France Location within Pays de la Loire
- Coordinates: 47°29′12″N 1°14′18″W
- Country: France
- Region: Pays de la Loire
- Department: Loire-Atlantique
- Arrondissement: Châteaubriant-Ancenis
- Canton: Ancenis-Saint-Géréon
- Intercommunality: Pays d'Ancenis

Government
  - Mayor (2020–2026): Jean-Michel Claude
- Area^{1}: 30.59 km^{2} (11.81 sq mi)
- Highest elevation: 79 m (259 ft)
- Lowest elevation: 22 m (72 ft)
- Population (2023): 1,439
  - Density: 47.04/km^{2} (121.8/sq mi)
- Time zone: UTC+01:00 (CET)
  - Summer (DST): UTC+02:00 (CEST)
- INSEE/Postal code: 44118 /44440
- ^{1} French Land Register data, which excludes lakes, ponds, glaciers > 1 km^{2} (0.386 sq mi or 247 acres) and river estuaries.

Pannecé (French pronunciation: [panse]; Breton: Panezeg) is a commune in the Loire-Atlantique department in western France.

== Population ==
Historical population
| Year | Pop. | ±% p.a. |
|---|---|---|
| 1968 | 1,171 | — |
| 1975 | 1,067 | −1.32% |
| 1982 | 980 | −1.21% |
| 1990 | 952 | −0.36% |
| 1999 | 911 | −0.49% |
| 2007 | 1,185 | +3.34% |
| 2012 | 1,357 | +2.75% |
| 2017 | 1,364 | +0.10% |
| 2023 | 1,439 | +0.90% |
Source: INSEE

== See also ==
- Communes of the Loire-Atlantique department
