= Couffé =

Couffé Cófaé (Gallo) Koufeg (Breton)
- Commune
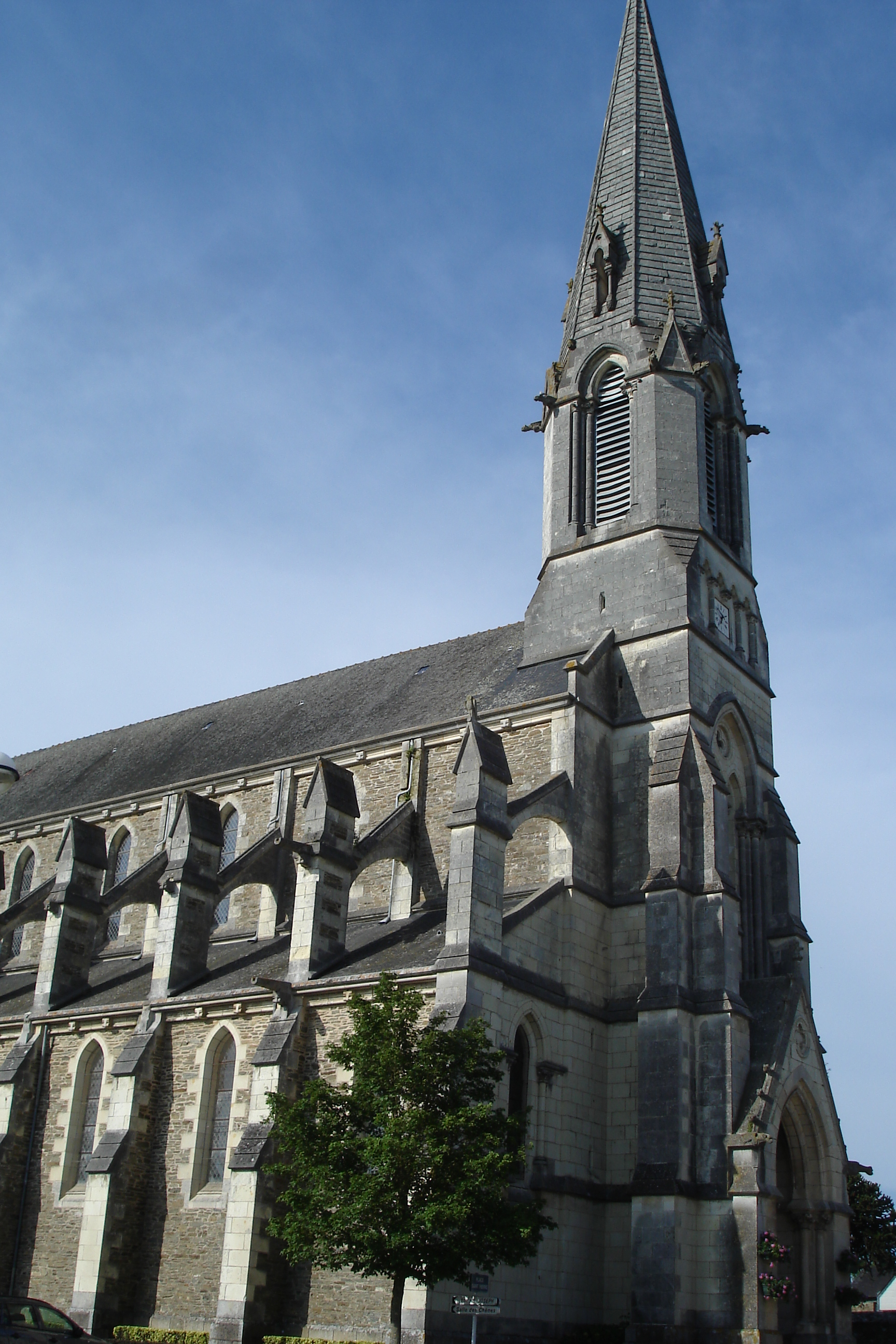

- Coat of arms
- Location of Couffé
- Location within France Location within Pays de la Loire
- Coordinates: 47°23′31″N 1°17′29″W
- Country: France
- Region: Pays de la Loire
- Department: Loire-Atlantique
- Arrondissement: Châteaubriant-Ancenis
- Canton: Ancenis-Saint-Géréon
- Intercommunality: Pays d'Ancenis

Government
  - Mayor (2020–2026): David Pageau
- Area^{1}: 39.97 km^{2} (15.43 sq mi)
- Highest elevation: 73 m (240 ft)
- Lowest elevation: 7 m (23 ft)
- Population (2023): 2,535
  - Density: 63.42/km^{2} (164.3/sq mi)
- Time zone: UTC+01:00 (CET)
  - Summer (DST): UTC+02:00 (CEST)
- INSEE/Postal code: 44048 /44521
- ^{1} French Land Register data, which excludes lakes, ponds, glaciers > 1 km^{2} (0.386 sq mi or 247 acres) and river estuaries.

Couffé (French pronunciation: [kufe]; Gallo: Cófaé, Breton: Koufeg) is a commune in the Loire-Atlantique department in western France.

== Population ==
Historical population

Year	Pop.	±% p.a.
1793	1,503	—
1821	1,681	+0.40%
1846	1,874	+0.44%
1872	2,008	+0.27%
1901	1,942	−0.12%
1926	1,549	−0.90%
1946	1,246	−1.08%
1962	1,267	+0.10%
1968	1,318	+0.66%

Year	Pop.	±% p.a.
1975	1,262	−0.62%
1982	1,469	+2.19%
1990	1,805	+2.61%
1999	1,790	−0.09%
2007	2,188	+2.54%
2012	2,330	+1.27%
2017	2,563	+1.92%
2023	2,535	−0.18%

Source: EHESS and INSEE (1968-2023)

== See also ==
- Communes of the Loire-Atlantique department
