= Montrelais =

- Commune
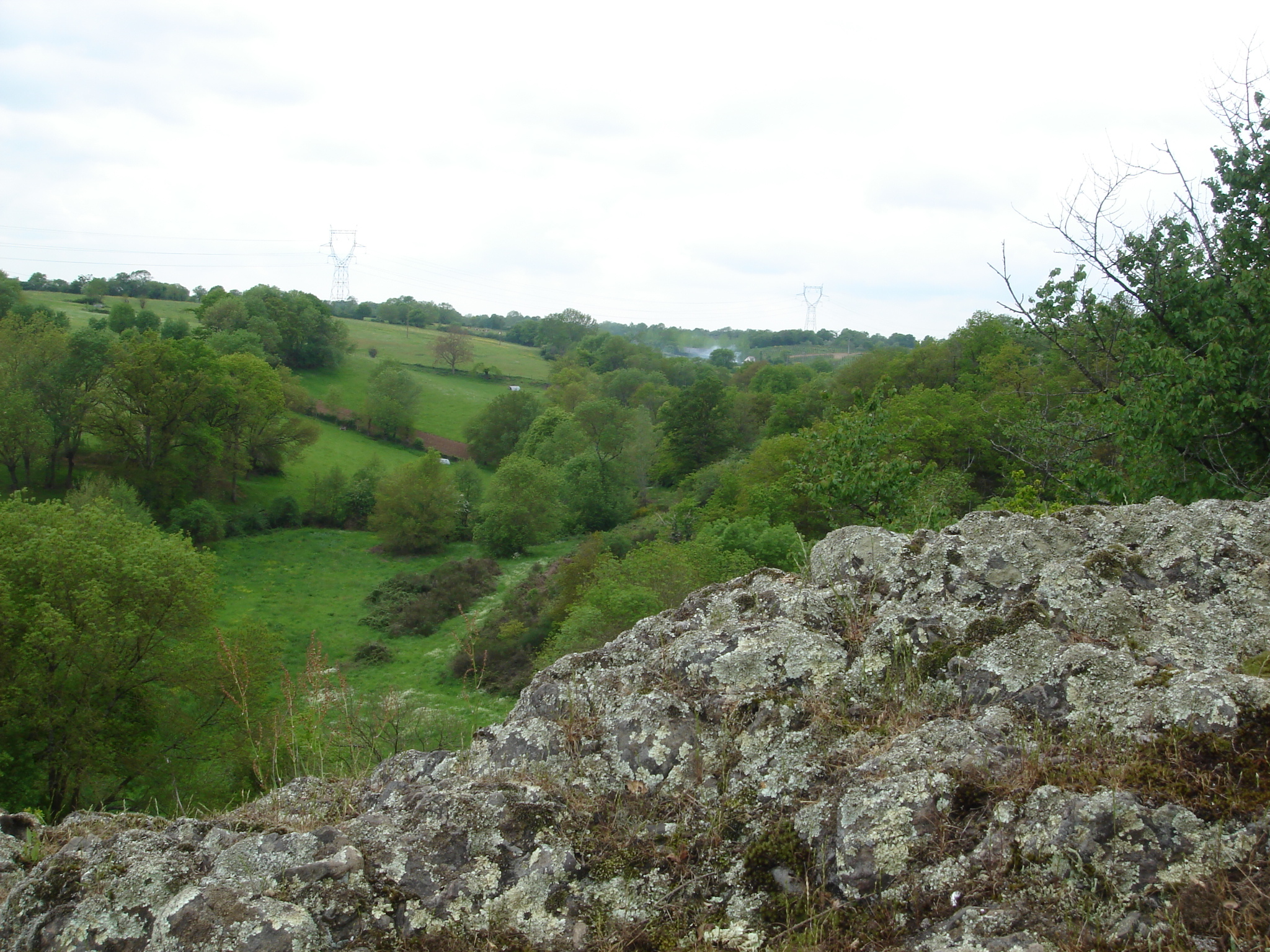
- Valley of Bray Creek

- Coat of arms
- Location of Montrelais
- Location within France Location within Pays de la Loire
- Coordinates: 47°23′23″N 0°57′55″W
- Country: France
- Region: Pays de la Loire
- Department: Loire-Atlantique
- Arrondissement: Châteaubriant-Ancenis
- Canton: Ancenis-Saint-Géréon
- Intercommunality: Pays d'Ancenis

Government
  - Mayor (2020–2026): Joël Jamin
- Area^{1}: 13.73 km^{2} (5.30 sq mi)
- Highest elevation: 62 m (203 ft)
- Lowest elevation: 7 m (23 ft)
- Population (2023): 859
  - Density: 62.6/km^{2} (162/sq mi)
- Time zone: UTC+01:00 (CET)
  - Summer (DST): UTC+02:00 (CEST)
- INSEE/Postal code: 44104 /44370
- ^{1} French Land Register data, which excludes lakes, ponds, glaciers > 1 km^{2} (0.386 sq mi or 247 acres) and river estuaries.

Montrelais (French pronunciation: [mɔ̃tʁəlɛ]; Breton: Mousterlez) is a commune in the Loire-Atlantique department in western France.

== Population ==
Historical population
Year	Pop.	±% p.a.
1968	514	—
1975	541	+0.73%
1982	587	+1.17%
1990	587	+0.00%
1999	663	+1.36%
2007	809	+2.52%
2012	850	+0.99%
2017	852	+0.05%
2023	859	+0.14%
Source: INSEE

== See also ==
- Communes of the Loire-Atlantique department
