= Oudon =

- Commune
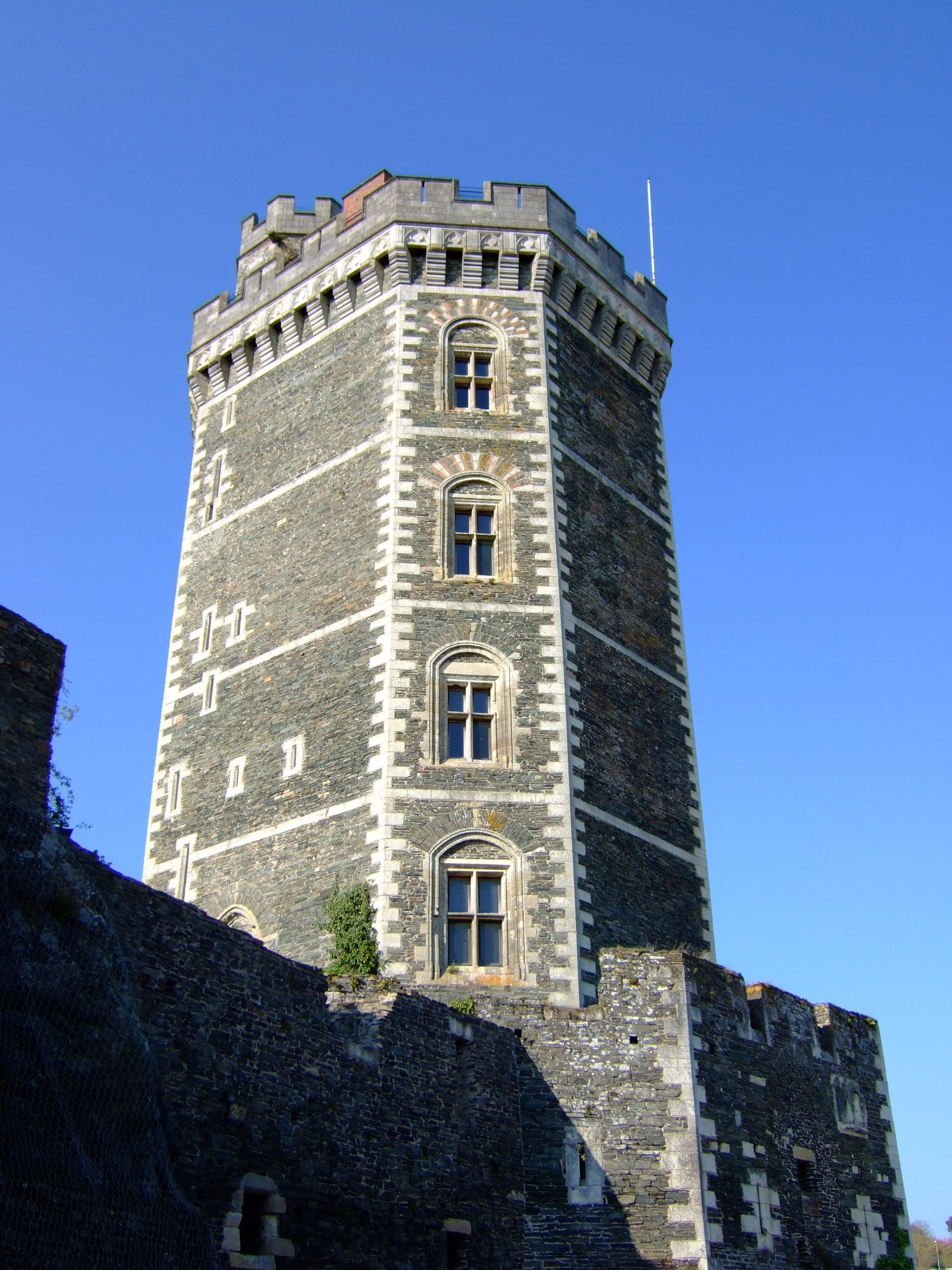
- The 14th century tower of the Château d'Oudon

- Coat of arms
- Location of Oudon
- Location within France Location within Pays de la Loire
- Coordinates: 47°20′50″N 1°17′09″W
- Country: France
- Region: Pays de la Loire
- Department: Loire-Atlantique
- Arrondissement: Châteaubriant-Ancenis
- Canton: Ancenis-Saint-Géréon
- Intercommunality: Pays d'Ancenis

Government
  - Mayor (2020–2026): Alain Bourgoin
- Area^{1}: 22.12 km^{2} (8.54 sq mi)
- Highest elevation: 74 m (243 ft)
- Lowest elevation: 2 m (6.6 ft)
- Population (2023): 3,904
  - Density: 176.5/km^{2} (457.1/sq mi)
- Time zone: UTC+01:00 (CET)
  - Summer (DST): UTC+02:00 (CEST)
- INSEE/Postal code: 44115 /44521
- ^{1} French Land Register data, which excludes lakes, ponds, glaciers > 1 km^{2} (0.386 sq mi or 247 acres) and river estuaries.

Oudon (French pronunciation: [udɔ̃]) is a commune in the Loire-Atlantique department in western France.

== Population ==
Historical population

Year	Pop.	±% p.a.
1793	1,492	—
1821	1,621	+0.30%
1846	1,768	+0.35%
1872	1,716	−0.11%
1901	1,677	−0.08%
1926	1,375	−0.79%
1946	1,346	−0.11%
1962	1,362	+0.07%
1968	1,371	+0.11%

Year	Pop.	±% p.a.
1975	1,599	+2.22%
1982	2,001	+3.26%
1990	2,353	+2.05%
1999	2,616	+1.18%
2007	3,126	+2.25%
2012	3,558	+2.62%
2017	3,805	+1.35%
2023	3,904	+0.43%

Source: EHESS and INSEE (1968-2023)

== Gallery ==
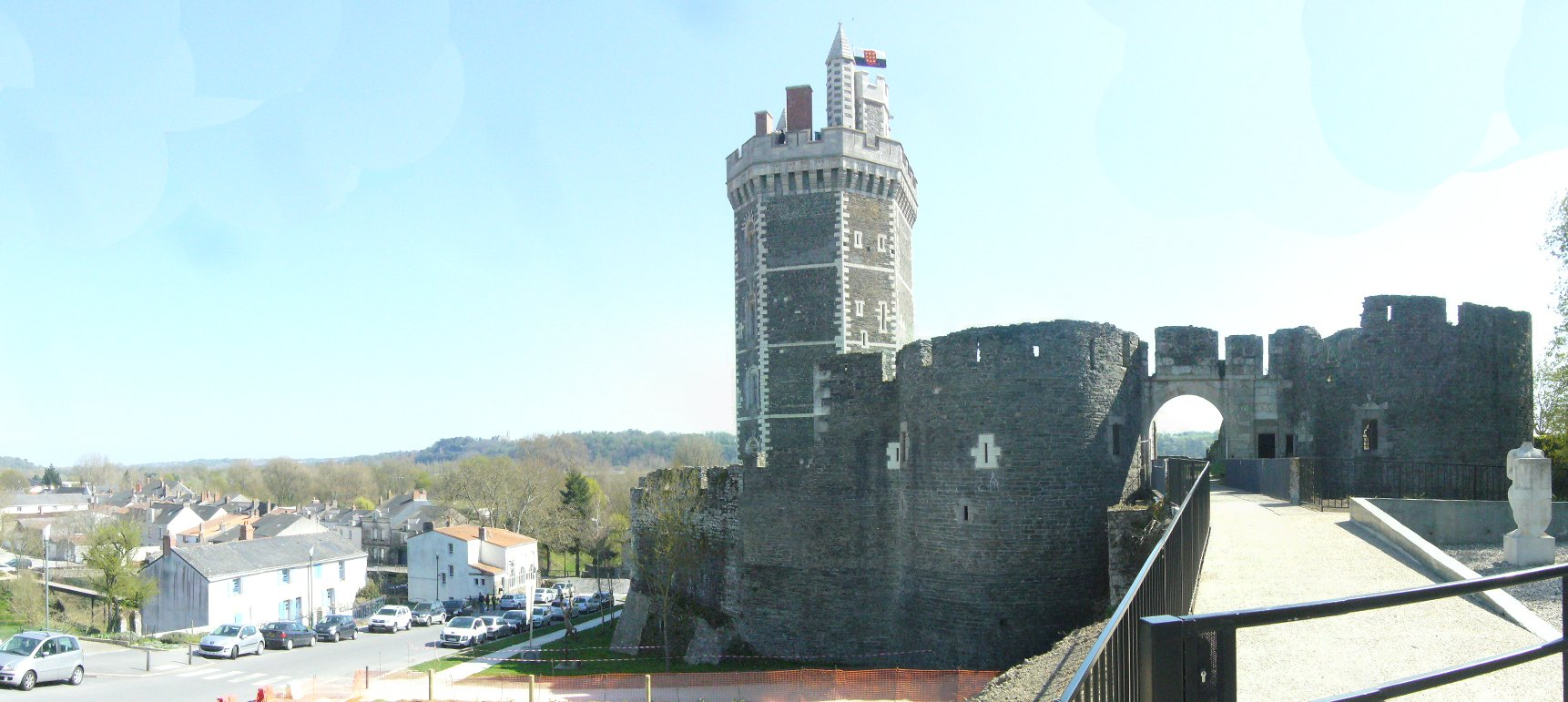
Oudon Castle

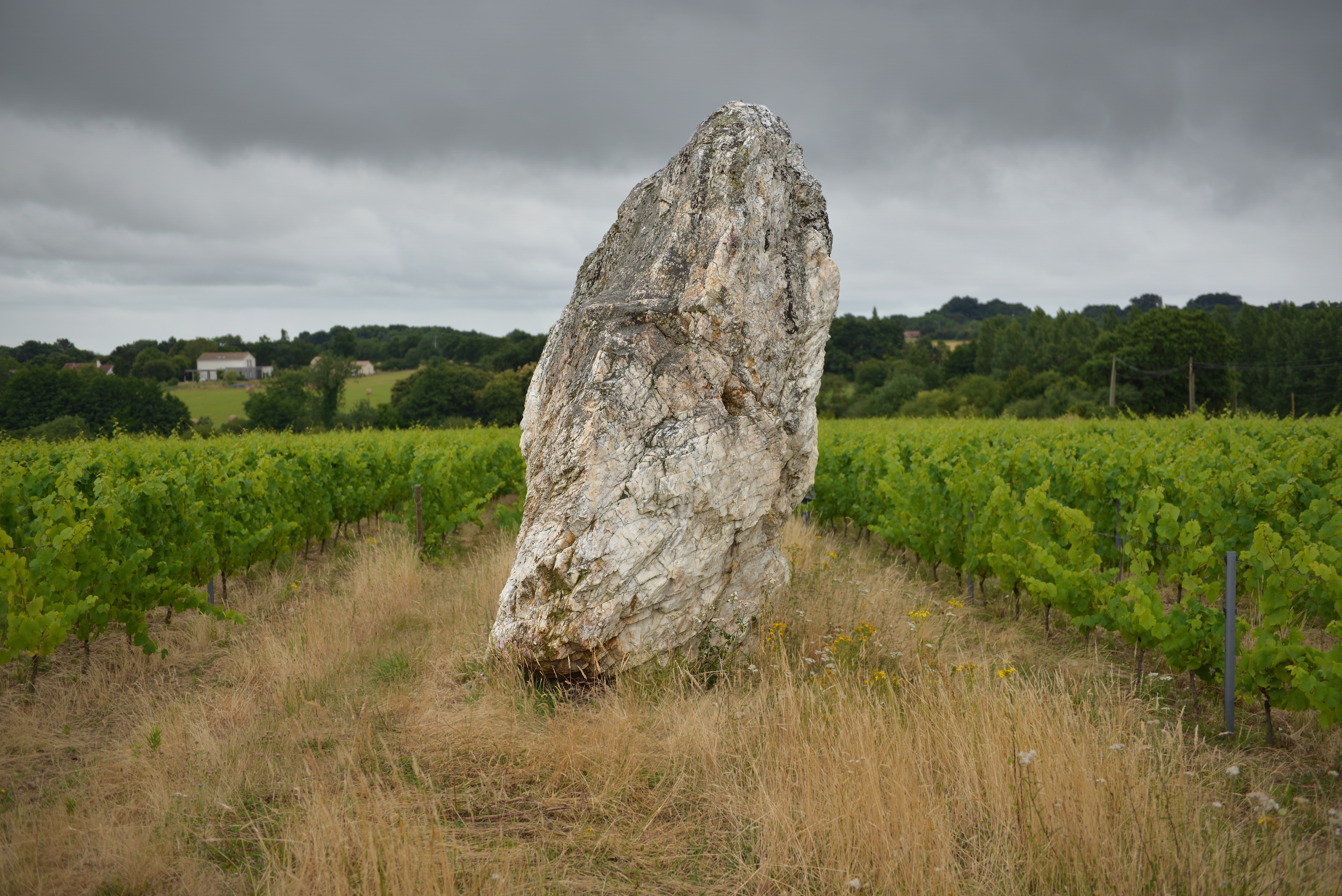
Menhir of "Pierre blanche"

== Town twinning ==
- (United Kingdom) Batheaston, Somerset, Great Britain

== See also ==
- Communes of the Loire-Atlantique department
