= La Roche-Blanche, Loire-Atlantique =

La Roche-Blanche
- Commune
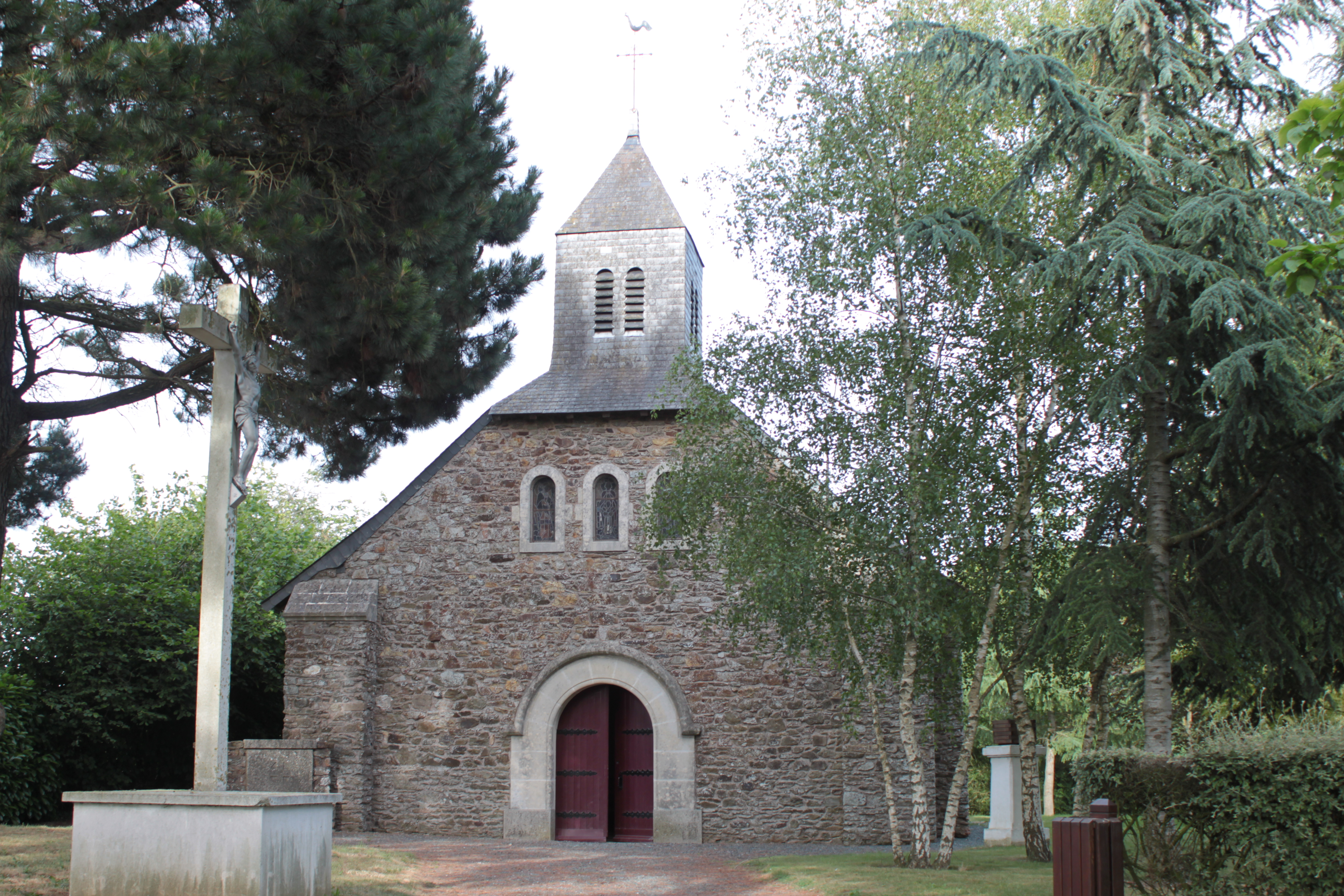

- Coat of arms
- Location of La Roche-Blanche
- Location within France Location within Pays de la Loire
- Coordinates: 47°26′30″N 1°08′22″W
- Country: France
- Region: Pays de la Loire
- Department: Loire-Atlantique
- Arrondissement: Châteaubriant-Ancenis
- Canton: Ancenis-Saint-Géréon
- Intercommunality: Pays d'Ancenis

Government
  - Mayor (2020–2026): Jacques Praud
- Area^{1}: 14.82 km^{2} (5.72 sq mi)
- Highest elevation: 84 m (276 ft)
- Lowest elevation: 7 m (23 ft)
- Population (2023): 1,261
  - Density: 85.09/km^{2} (220.4/sq mi)
- Time zone: UTC+01:00 (CET)
  - Summer (DST): UTC+02:00 (CEST)
- INSEE/Postal code: 44222 /44522
- ^{1} French Land Register data, which excludes lakes, ponds, glaciers > 1 km^{2} (0.386 sq mi or 247 acres) and river estuaries.

La Roche-Blanche (French pronunciation: [la ʁɔʃ blɑ̃ʃ]; Breton: Ar Roc'h-Wenn) is a commune in the Loire-Atlantique department in western France.

== Population ==
Historical population
Year	Pop.	±% p.a.
1968	671	—
1975	723	+1.07%
1982	843	+2.22%
1990	930	+1.24%
1999	840	−1.12%
2007	958	+1.66%
2012	1,142	+3.58%
2017	1,194	+0.89%
2023	1,261	+0.91%
Source: INSEE

== See also ==
- Communes of the Loire-Atlantique department
