= Le Pin, Loire-Atlantique =

Le Pin Le Pein/L'Piñ (Gallo) Ar Bineg (Breton)
- Commune
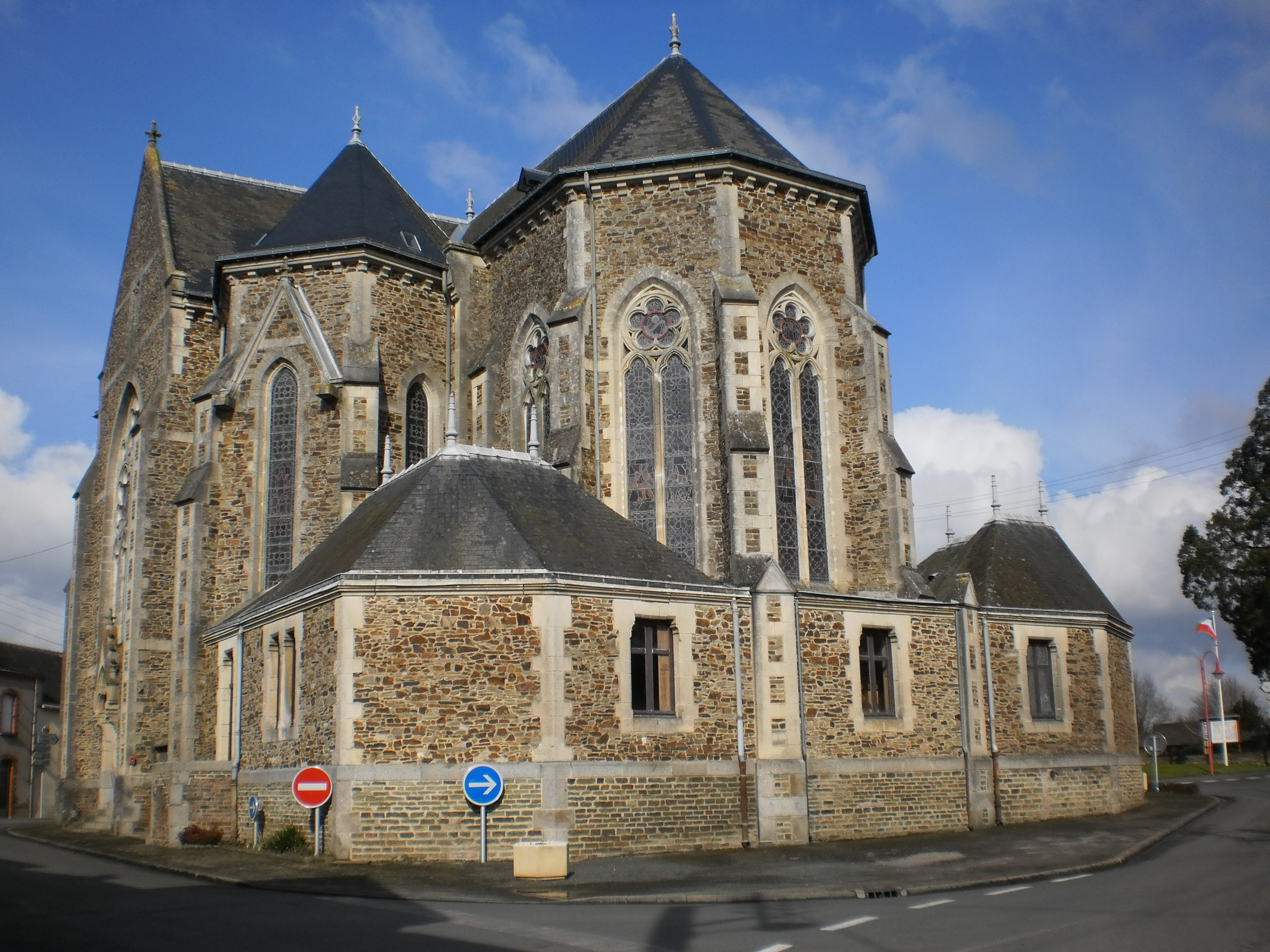
- Location of Le Pin
- Location within France Location within Pays de la Loire
- Coordinates: 47°35′24″N 1°09′08″W
- Country: France
- Region: Pays de la Loire
- Department: Loire-Atlantique
- Arrondissement: Châteaubriant-Ancenis
- Canton: Ancenis-Saint-Géréon
- Intercommunality: Pays d'Ancenis

Government
  - Mayor (2020–2026): Maxime Poupart
- Area^{1}: 24.95 km^{2} (9.63 sq mi)
- Highest elevation: 91 m (299 ft)
- Lowest elevation: 39 m (128 ft)
- Population (2023): 868
  - Density: 34.8/km^{2} (90.1/sq mi)
- Time zone: UTC+01:00 (CET)
  - Summer (DST): UTC+02:00 (CEST)
- INSEE/Postal code: 44124 /44540
- ^{1} French Land Register data, which excludes lakes, ponds, glaciers > 1 km^{2} (0.386 sq mi or 247 acres) and river estuaries.

Le Pin (French pronunciation: [lə pɛ̃]; Gallo: Le Pein or L'Piñ, Breton: Ar Bineg) is a commune in the Arrondissement of Châteaubriant-Ancenis of the Loire-Atlantique department in western France. It is located between Rennes and Angers, in the drainage basin of the Erdre, a right tributary of the Loire.

== Population ==
Historical population
Year	Pop.	±% p.a.
1968	752	—
1975	698	−1.06%
1982	680	−0.37%
1990	602	−1.51%
1999	602	+0.00%
2007	692	+1.76%
2012	792	+2.74%
2017	754	−0.98%
2023	868	+2.37%
Source: INSEE

== See also ==
- Communes of the Loire-Atlantique department
