= Pouillé-les-Côteaux =

Pouillé-les-Coteaux Paolieg-ar-Rozioù
- Commune
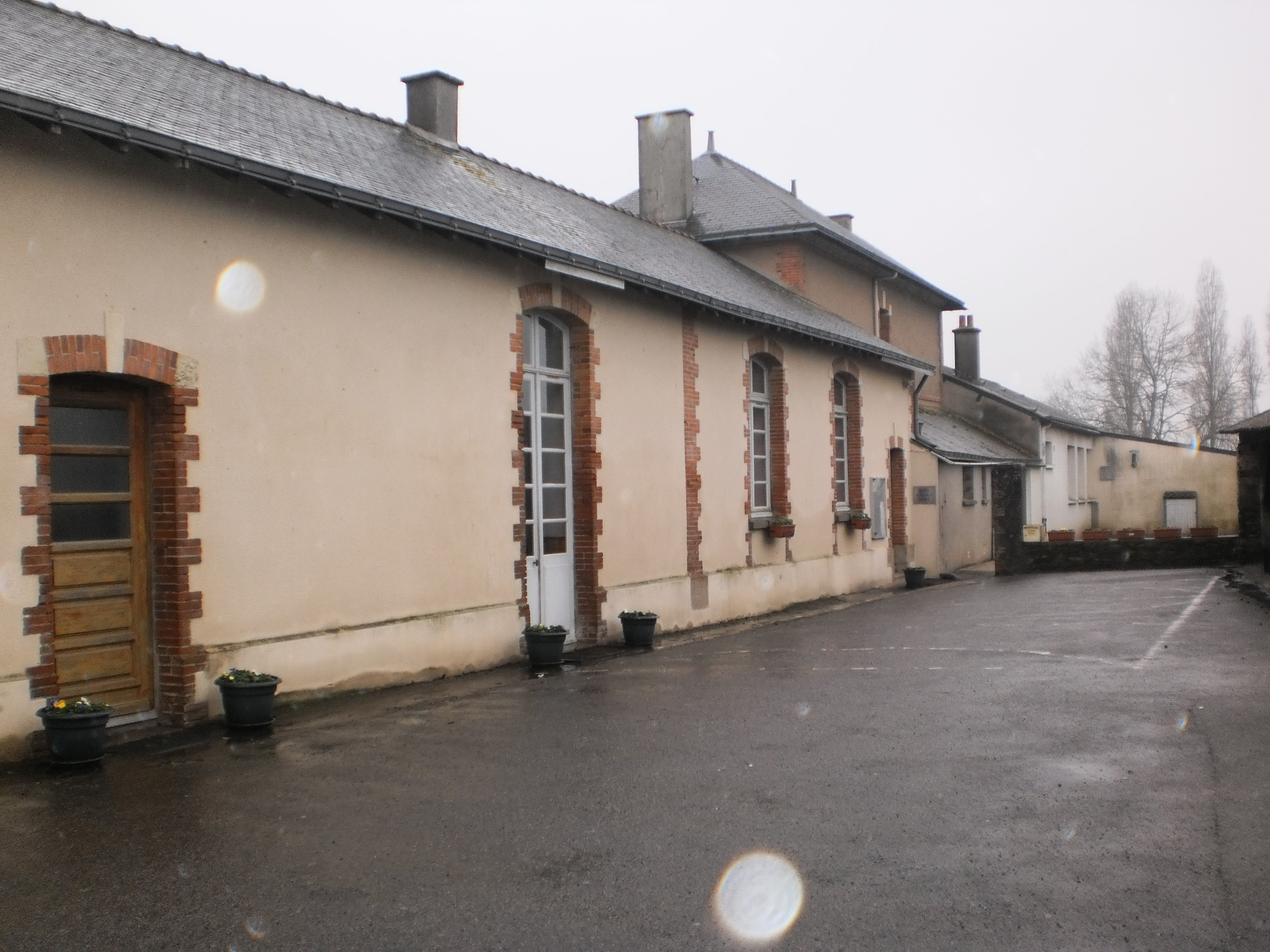
- Town hall
- Location of Pouillé-les-Coteaux
- Location within France Location within Pays de la Loire
- Coordinates: 47°27′22″N 1°09′39″W
- Country: France
- Region: Pays de la Loire
- Department: Loire-Atlantique
- Arrondissement: Châteaubriant-Ancenis
- Canton: Ancenis-Saint-Géréon
- Intercommunality: Pays d'Ancenis

Government
  - Mayor (2020–2026): Laurent Mercier
- Area^{1}: 11.72 km^{2} (4.53 sq mi)
- Highest elevation: 76 m (249 ft)
- Lowest elevation: 18 m (59 ft)
- Population (2023): 1,033
  - Density: 88.14/km^{2} (228.3/sq mi)
- Time zone: UTC+01:00 (CET)
  - Summer (DST): UTC+02:00 (CEST)
- INSEE/Postal code: 44134 /44522
- ^{1} French Land Register data, which excludes lakes, ponds, glaciers > 1 km^{2} (0.386 sq mi or 247 acres) and river estuaries.

Pouillé-les-Côteaux (French pronunciation: [puje le koto]; Breton: Paolieg-ar-Rozioù) is a commune in the Loire-Atlantique department in western France.

== Population ==
Historical population
Year	Pop.	±% p.a.
1968	570	—
1975	515	−1.44%
1982	561	+1.23%
1990	672	+2.28%
1999	698	+0.42%
2007	806	+1.81%
2012	951	+3.36%
2017	1,051	+2.02%
2023	1,033	−0.29%
Source: INSEE

== See also ==
- Communes of the Loire-Atlantique department
