= Canton of Ancenis-Saint-Géréon =

Coordinates: 47.37°N 1.18°W

The canton of Ancenis-Saint-Géréon (before 2021: Ancenis) is an administrative division of the Loire-Atlantique department, western France. Its borders were modified at the French canton reorganisation which came into effect in March 2015. Its seat is in Ancenis-Saint-Géréon.

It consists of the following communes:

1. Ancenis-Saint-Géréon
2. Couffé
3. Loireauxence
4. Mésanger
5. Montrelais
6. Oudon
7. Pannecé
8. Le Pin
9. Pouillé-les-Côteaux
10. La Roche-Blanche
11. Vair-sur-Loire
12. Vallons-de-l'Erdre
