= Le Minor =

- Type: Private
- Industry: Clothing industry
- Founded: 1922; 104 years ago
- Headquarters: Guidel, France
- Products: Coats and knitwear
- Website: leminor.fr

Le Minor is a French company specializing in the manufacture of coats and knitwear. The company is based in Guidel.

It was formed in 1982 through the merger of Manufacture Bonneterie Lorientaise and Le Minor brand, which was founded in 1936.

== History ==
In 1922, Berthe Etui founded Manufacture Bonneterie Lorientaise (MBL) in Lorient. At the time, the company primarily produced sweaters for Breton fishermen. In 1936, Marie-Anne Le Minor founded an embroidery and garment workshop in Pont-l'Abbé, Finistère, producing traditional Breton clothing and dolls. In 1947, Le Minor reintroduced the Kabig, a traditional Breton coat.

In 1982, following its bankruptcy, the Le Minor brand was acquired by Manufacture Bonneterie Lorientaise, and production was moved to Guidel (Morbihan). In 1987, the company was acquired by the Grammatico family.

In 2010, Le Minor lost its contract to supply sweaters to the French Navy, which it had held for several decades. In 2018, Le Minor was acquired by Jérôme Permingeat and Sylvain Flet, founders of Le Flageolet.

In 2025, Le Minor opened the Musée de la Marinière at its production site in Guidel. The museum covers the history of the company and the production of maritime clothing, including the Breton striped shirt. In 2026, Le Minor organized the first Guidel Fashion Week, a fashion and textile event held in Guidel.

== Activities ==
The company mainly manufactures maritime sweaters and Breton striped shirts at its production site in Guidel, Morbihan.

A separate company originating from the original Le Minor business founded in Pont-l'Abbé continues to operate in the fields of embroidery and decorative arts.
