= St. Gereon's Basilica, Cologne =

Church in Cologne

Coordinates: 50°56′36″N 6°56′45″E

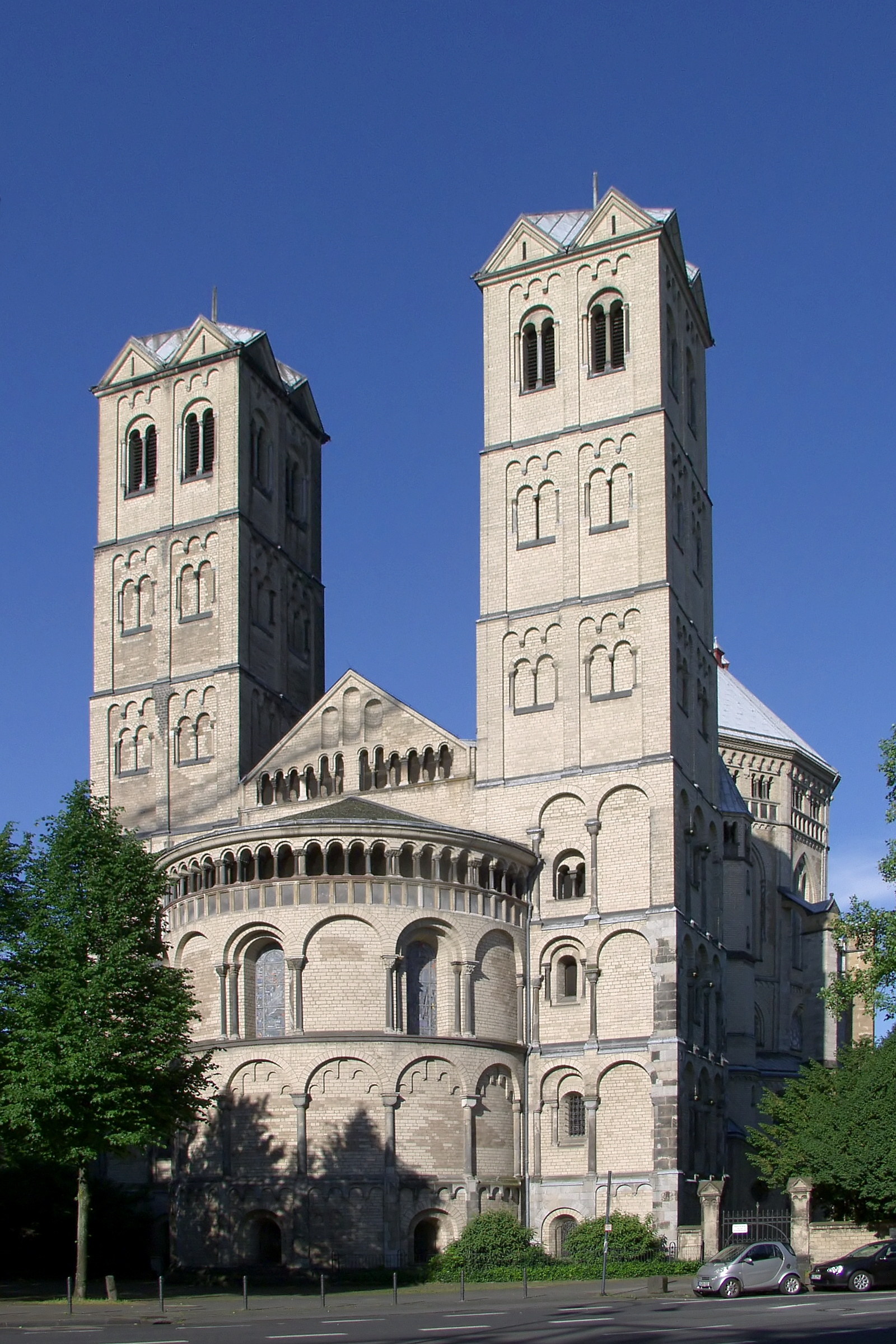
St. Gereon's Basilica, Cologne

St. Gereon's Basilica (Basilika Sankt Gereon) is a German Roman Catholic church in Cologne, dedicated to Saint Gereon, and designated a minor basilica on 25 June 1920.

In the core of St. Gereon, significant remains of an oval central building with nine cones of ancient Roman architecture from the second half of the 4th century (between 350 and 365) have been preserved. This, the lower part of today's decagon, is one of the most important examples of ancient representative architecture north of the Alps and, alongside the somewhat older Trier Cathedral (core building around 340) and the Trier Aula Palatina of Constantine the Great (around 311), which has been used as a church since 1856, is one of the oldest still existing Sacred buildings in Germany.

The first documented mention of a church dedicated to St. Gereon in this location dates back to 612, for which probably only the Roman building was used. Around 800 AD, Archbishop Hildebold had a rectangular choir added to the oval building, into the ancient cavaedium (atrium) around 800 AD and Archbishop Arnold II von Wied added the current choir gallery, apse, and transepts from 1151. The ancient mausoleum was strengthened, sheathed on the outside, converted into a decagon and elevated with Gothic galleries and a central dome between 1219 and 1227. It is one of twelve great churches in Cologne that were built in the Romanesque style.

== Ancient core building ==
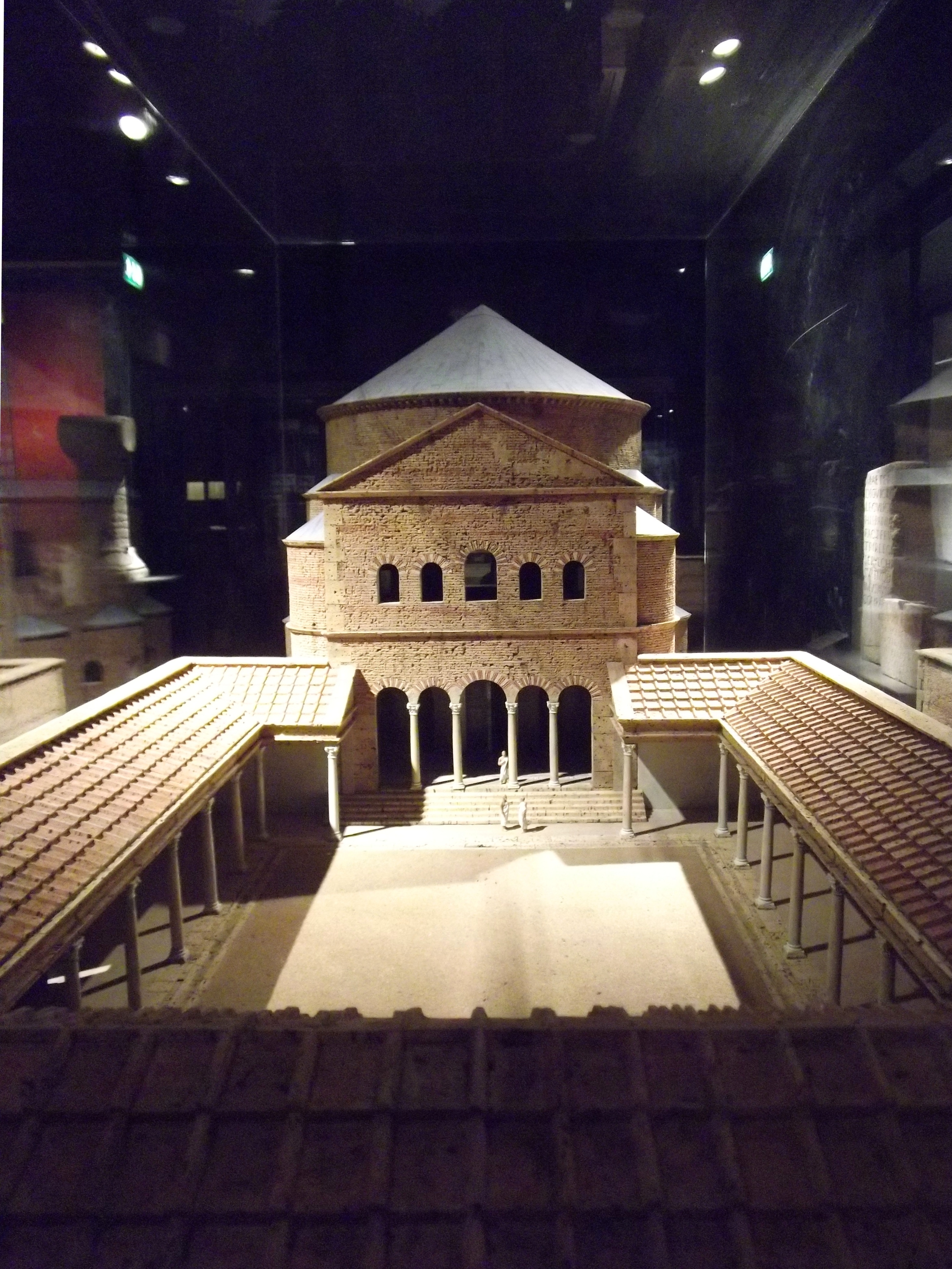
Late antique oval building with vestibule and atrium (model, 2010)

To the northwest of the city wall of the ancient Roman city Colonia Claudia Ara Agrippinensium, a huge late antique central building was built in the 4th century on the city's oldest burial ground (necropolis) above a rectangular grave building (memoria), the original function of which has not yet been clearly classified (mausoleum / memorial building) that was converted into a church by the sixth century. This original church was perhaps called the church of the Golden Saints (ad sanctos aureos) by Gregory of Tours. Judging from the archaeological finds, the central building must have been built in the second half of the 4th century, probably between 350 and 365. It is not known who had this building built and what purpose it served. It was probably a mausoleum of a rich and powerful early Christian family in the provincial capital of Germania Inferior in the time of Emperor Constantius II.

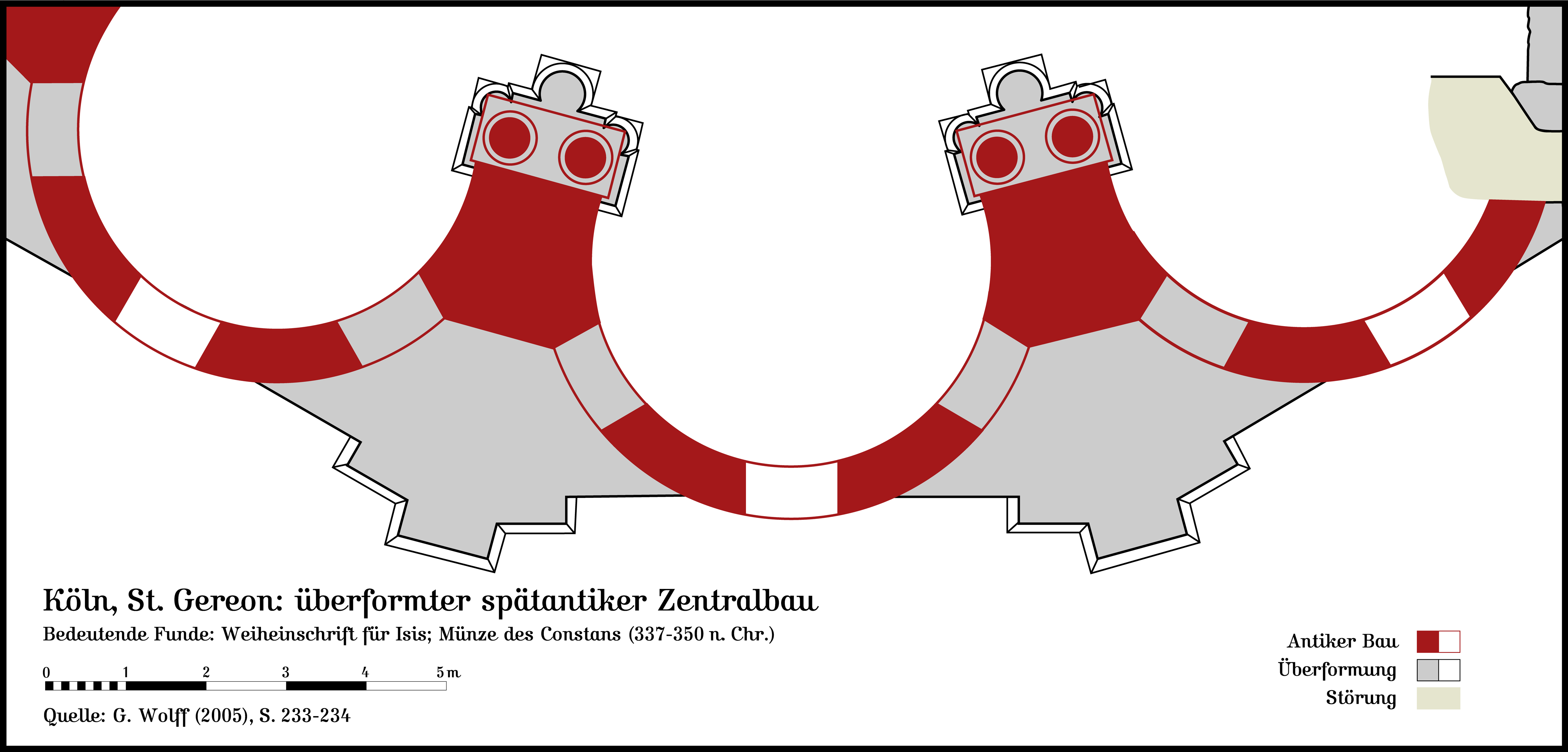
Conches of 350 AD shaped into an octagon around 1220, with a preserved wall height of 16.50 meters

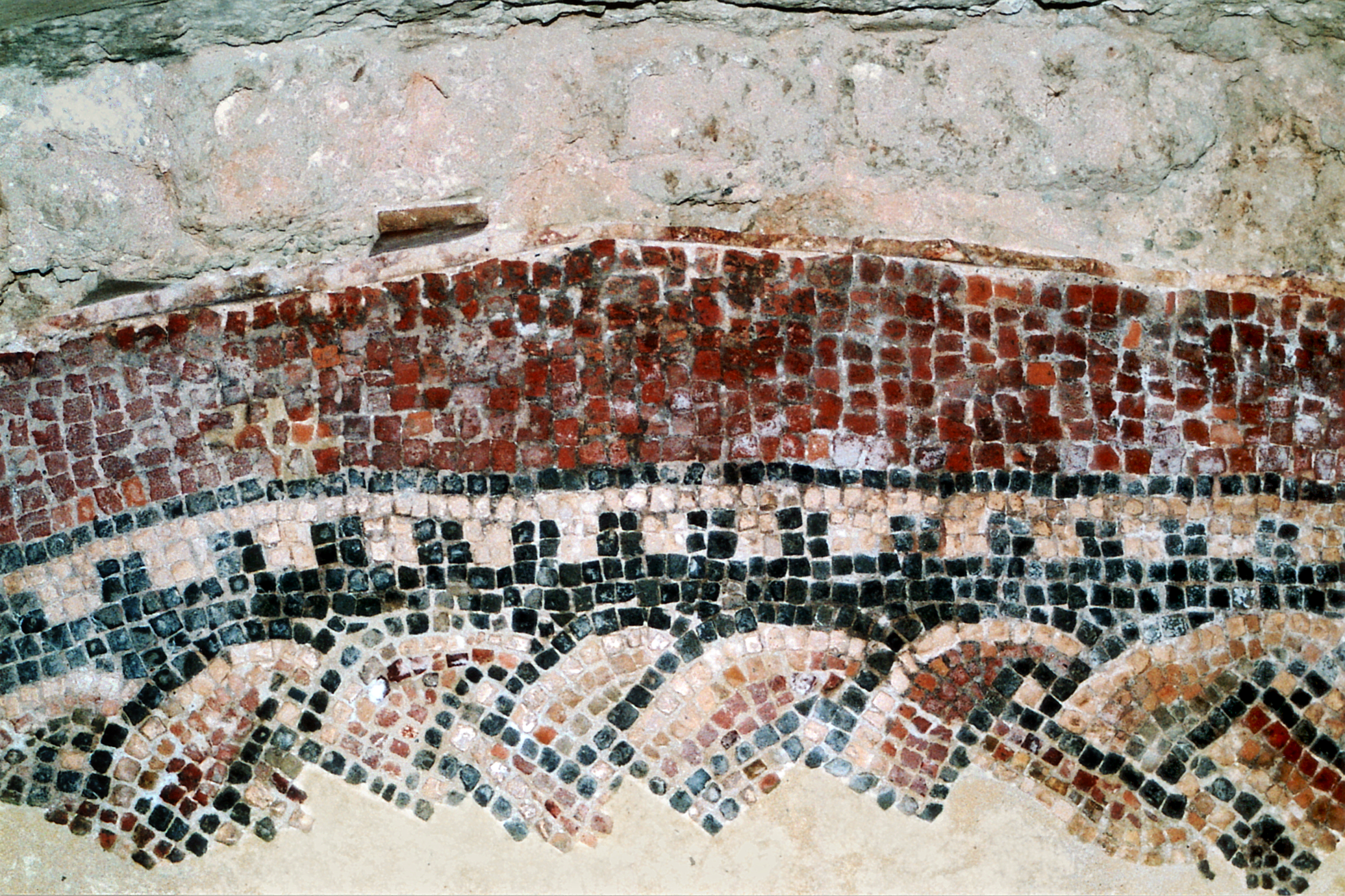
Remains of the late antique floor mosaic

The church stands slightly elevated on a hill, next to the intersection of two streets that follow the ancient Roman streets. A fragmented Isis consecration stone and a coin from the period after 345 were found on the site. The domed oval building was surrounded by four windowed conches to the north and south and had a semicircular apse to the east. There was a rich structure of columns between the horseshoe-shaped conches and possibly also in the double-shelled and fenestrated zone of the drum above. The diameter of the late antique oval dome was 23.70 m by 19.80 m. In terms of floor plan and ground floor, the building is comparable to the so-called Temple of Minerva Medica, a decagonal, domed central building in Rome that was built around 320 and served as a nymphaeum. The system of a wreath of niches in the outer walls of ancient buildings can also be observed elsewhere in Roman architecture.

The late antique building was richly furnished. The wall cladding with marble slabs and gold base mosaics, the gold dome mosaic and the floor covered with mosaic stones must have presented a magnificent sight. An exposed ornamental fragment of the floor mosaic was preserved in the first conche on the south side. In the preserved conches (originally covered with mosaics) there are also three bricked-up arched windows to be seen today. During the renovation in the 13th century, the late antique oval building was encased in supporting masonry in the shape of a decagon, so that up to 16.50 meters of wall height of the oval antique building has been preserved today.

== Romanesque church ==
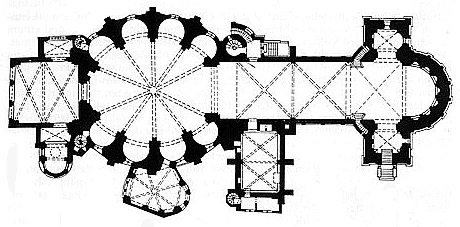
Floor plan

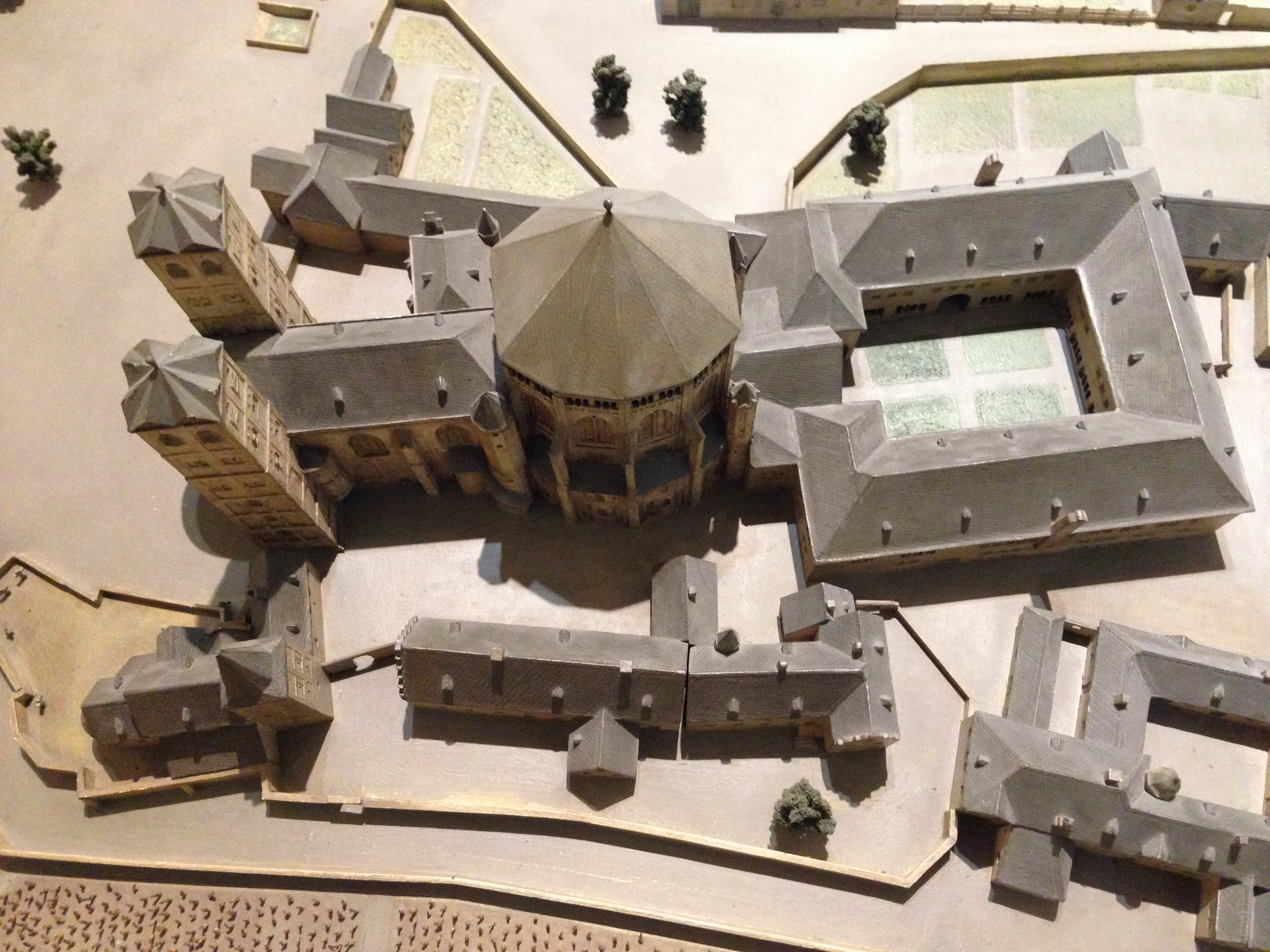
Model: Complex of the canons' monastery around 1700

Cologne's first Archbishop Hildebold (approx. 787–818) had a rectangular choir and an outer crypt built in place of the semicircular eastern apse of the oval building. He founded a canons' monastery here and the church was converted into a collegiate church in 839. In the years 1060 to 1062, under Archbishop Anno II, a new, elongated choir room was added for the members of the monastery, noble canons, and a crypt was set up underneath. Since 1121 the bones of St Gereon are venerated as a relic. From 1151 to 1156, Archbishop Arnold von Wied had the choir section expanded to the east with a choir square flanked by two towers with a semicircular apse, while at the same time extending the crypt underneath. The choir room received wall paintings and a mosaic floor. In the years 1219–1227, the early Christian oval building adjacent to the west was reinforced and encased on the outside, transformed into a decagon and at the same time raised with Gothic galleries and covered with a central dome. The Palatine Chapel in Aachen, coronation place of the Kings of the Romans, served as a model here, although the Cologne building was constructed in contemporary Gothic style, not in the earlier Carolingian architecture.

St. Gereon has a highly irregular plan, the nave being covered by a decagonal oval dome, 21.0 m long and 16.9 m wide, completed in 1227 on the remains of the antique central building. The special feature is based on the construction of the oval, which is made up of individual circular sections that were constructed from four centers distributed in a cross shape around the middle of the room. The conche niches with their vaulted semicircular ceilings and bricked-up windows of the ancient building are still preserved. The central eastern conche of the ancient building was probably replaced by a rectangular choir in the 9th century. The outer crypt was probably built at this point at the beginning of the 11th century.

The late Romanesque-early Gothic dome of the decagon is the largest dome built in the West between the erection of the Hagia Sophia in the 6th century and the Duomo of Florence in the 15th century.

In 1876, the roof of the decagon had to be rebuilt after storm damage. Ernst Seifert built an organ in 1898. In the 20th century, the architect Andreas Dilthey worked on its interior.

The Bombing of Cologne in World War II particularly endangered the decagon; by 1952 it was in acute danger of collapse. The statics were secured in 1968 and again until 1985. Until then, the decagon was separated from the long choir, which was used for church services. The decagon and eastern apse were equipped with color window cycles by Georg Meistermann and Wilhelm Buschulte.

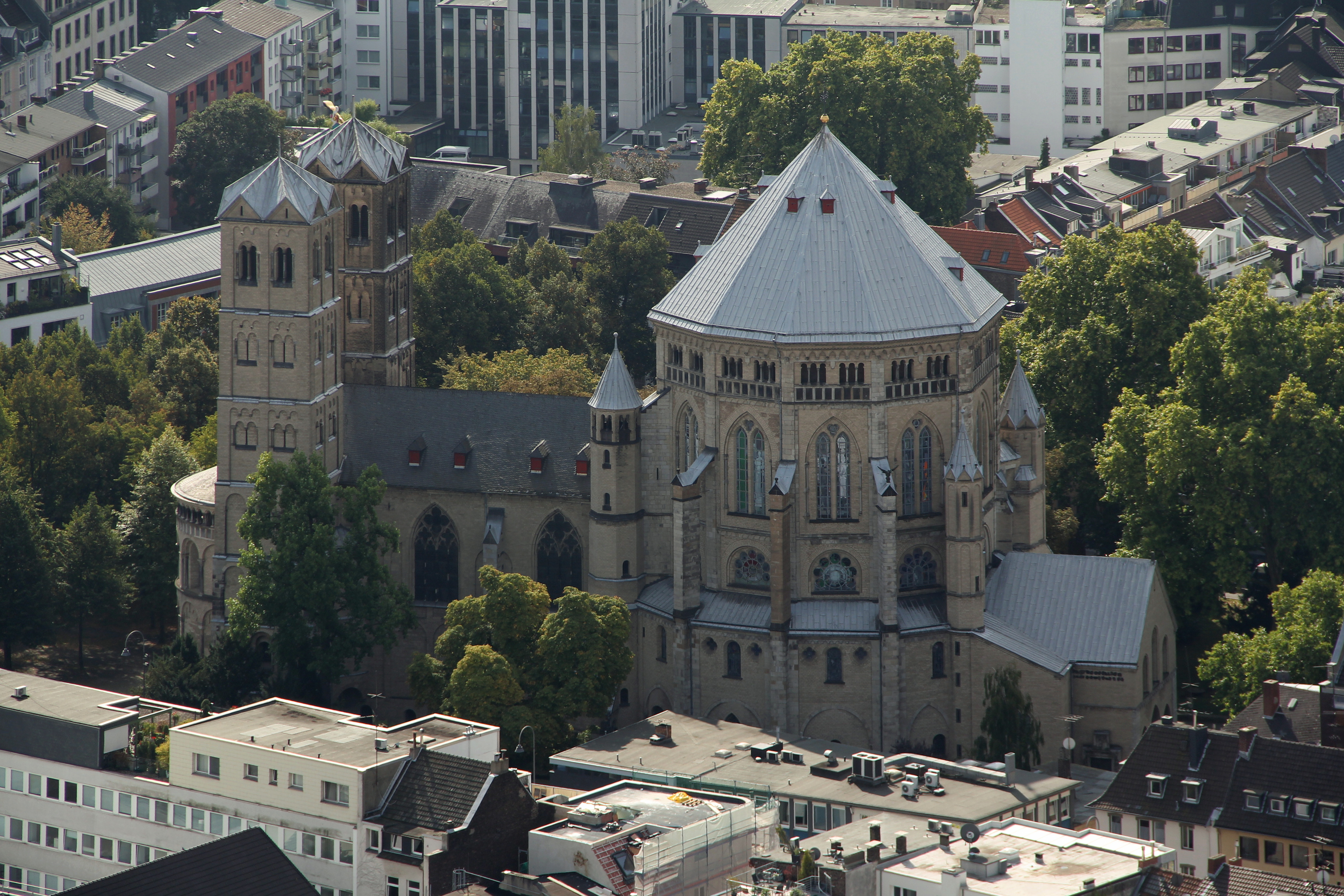
Aerial view

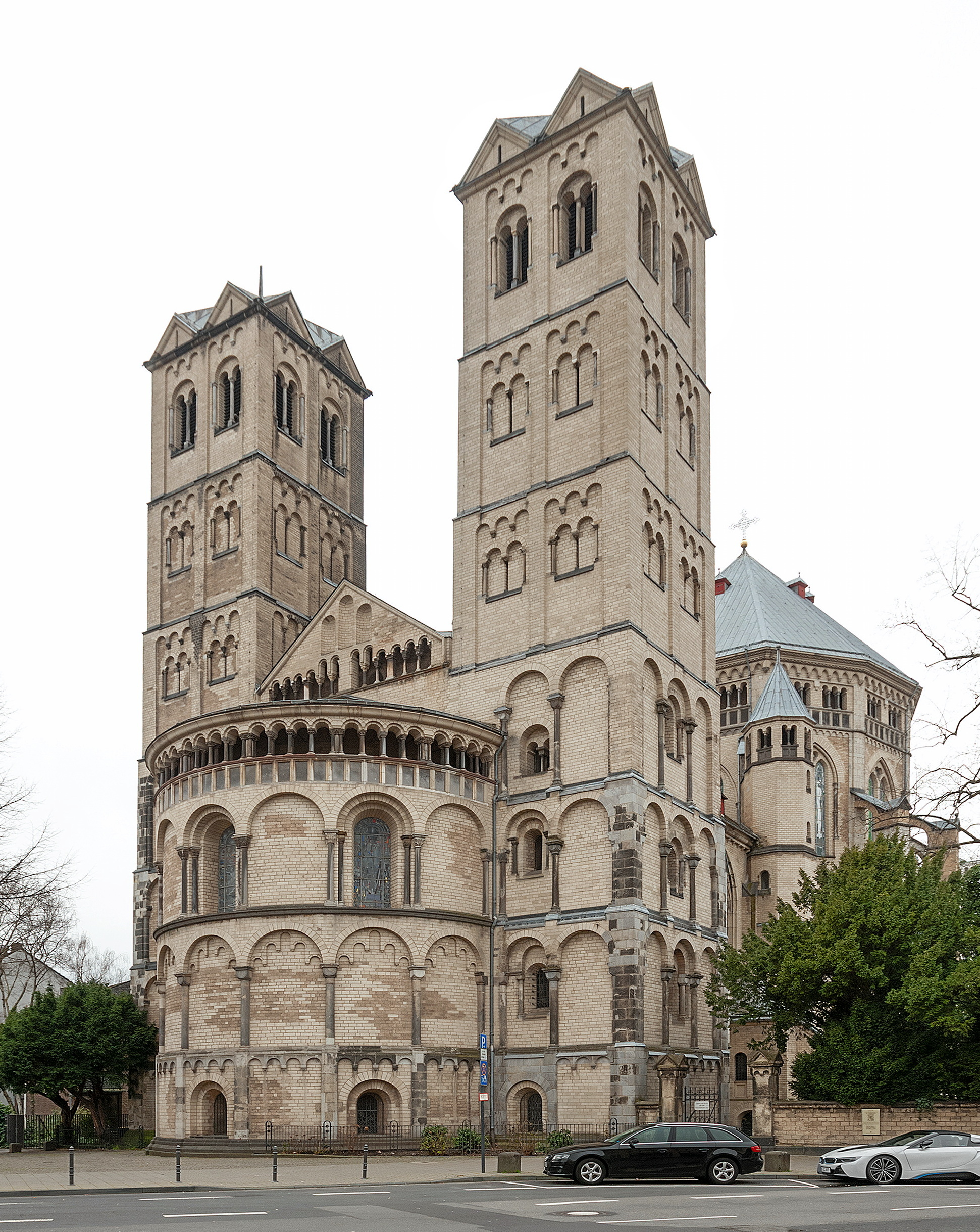
Choir and flank towers

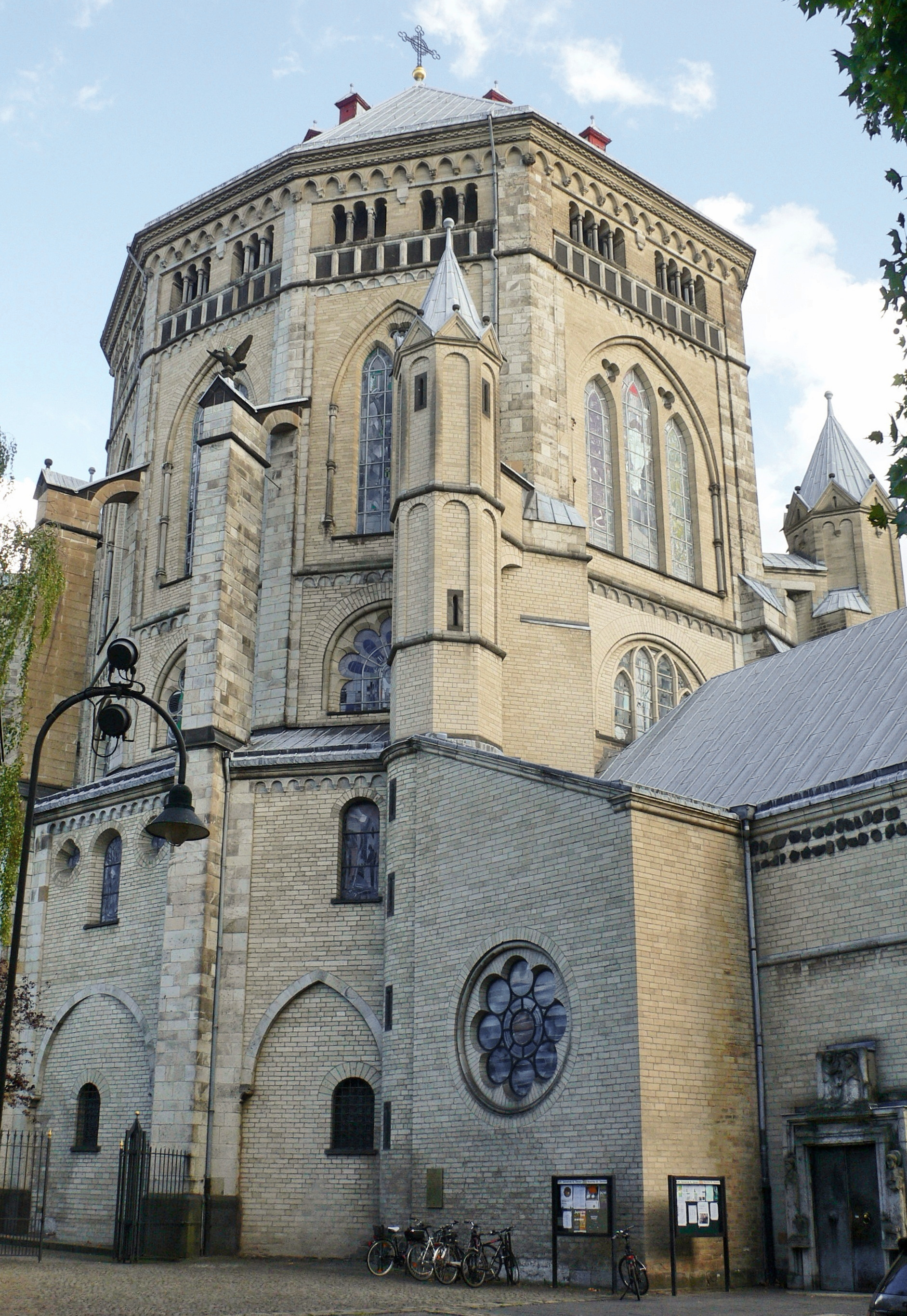
Decagon

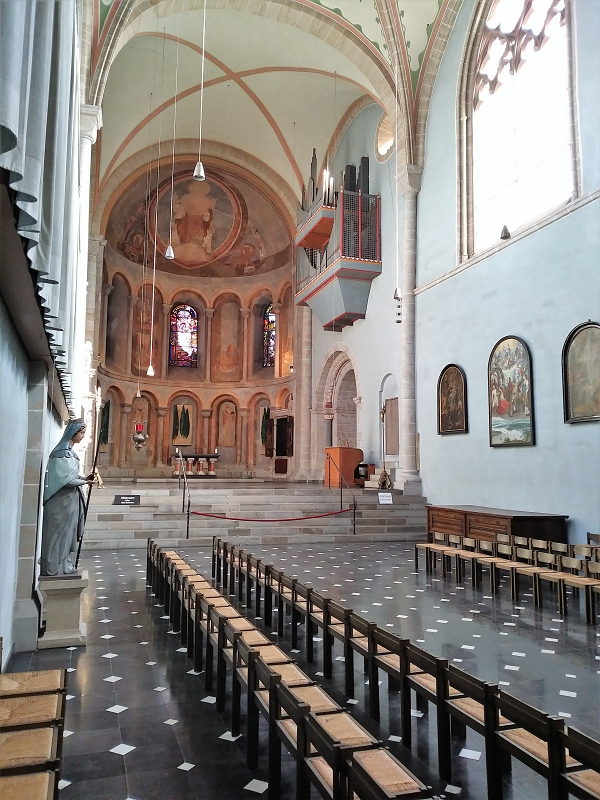
The Canons′ Choir of 1060/1156

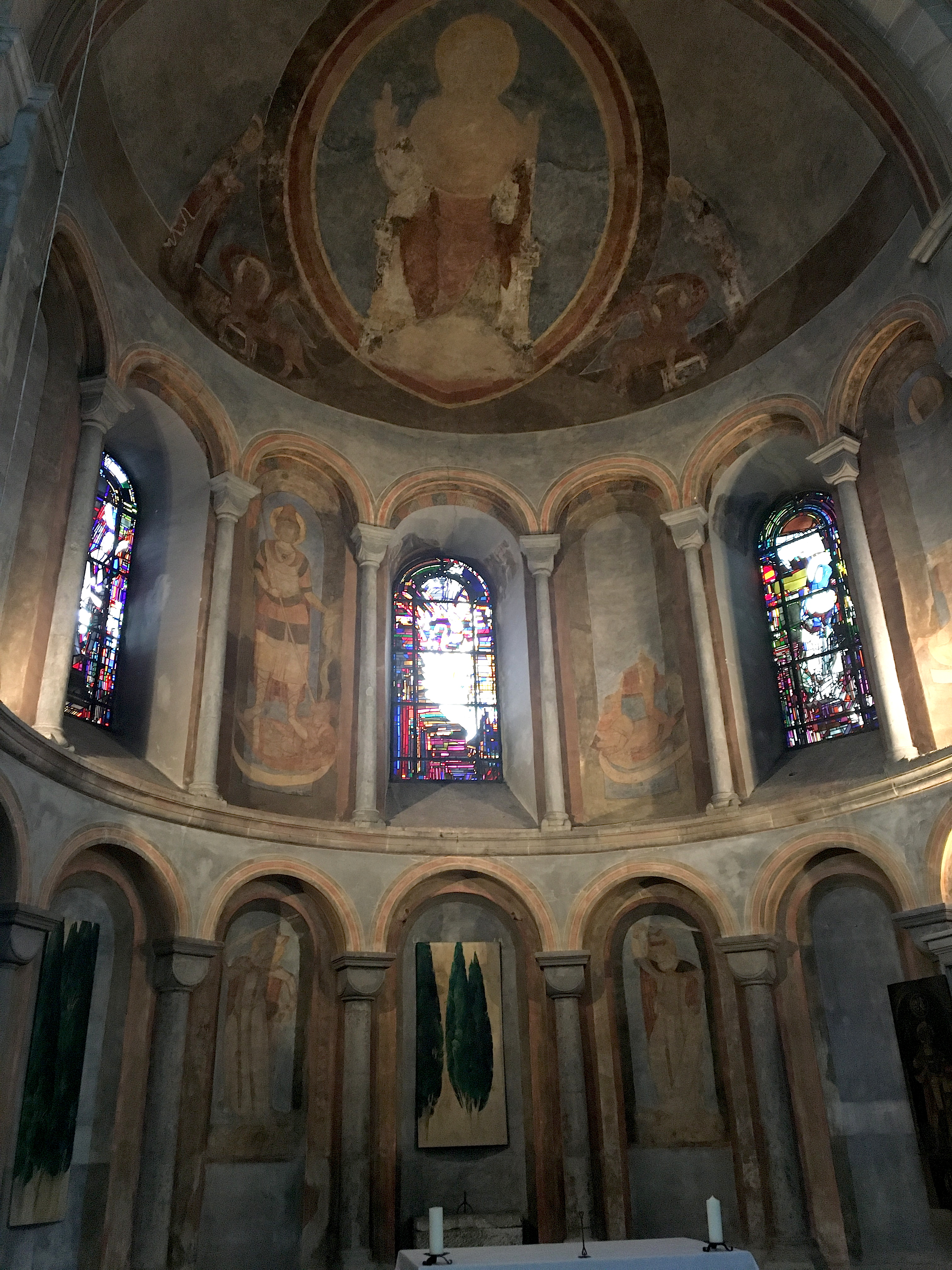
Round choir end with an unstructured half dome

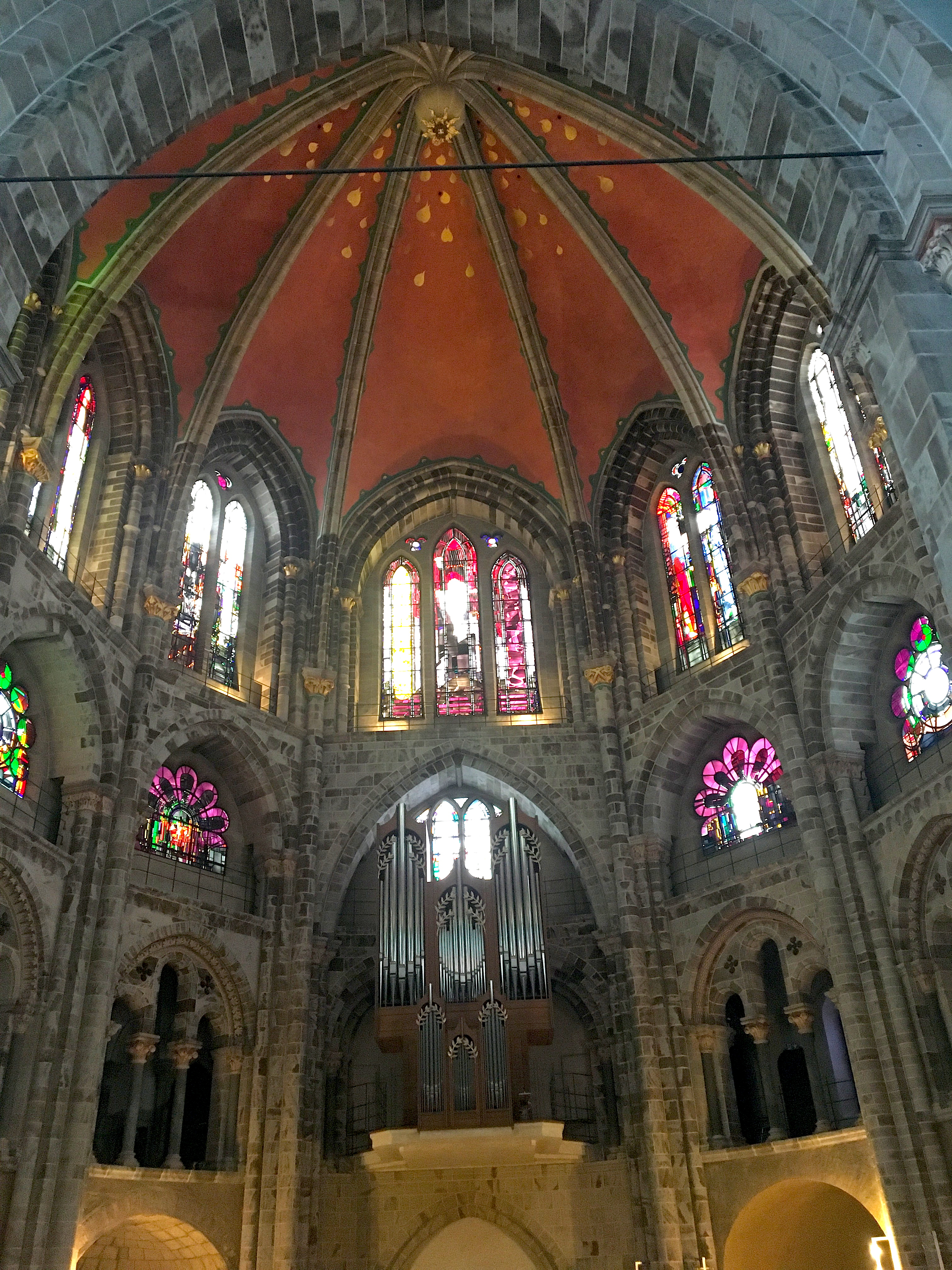
The decagon on the west side is the ancient oval building from 350 AD, up to 16 m high. Above it are the upper floors converted into a decagon around 1220 with a Gothic vault.

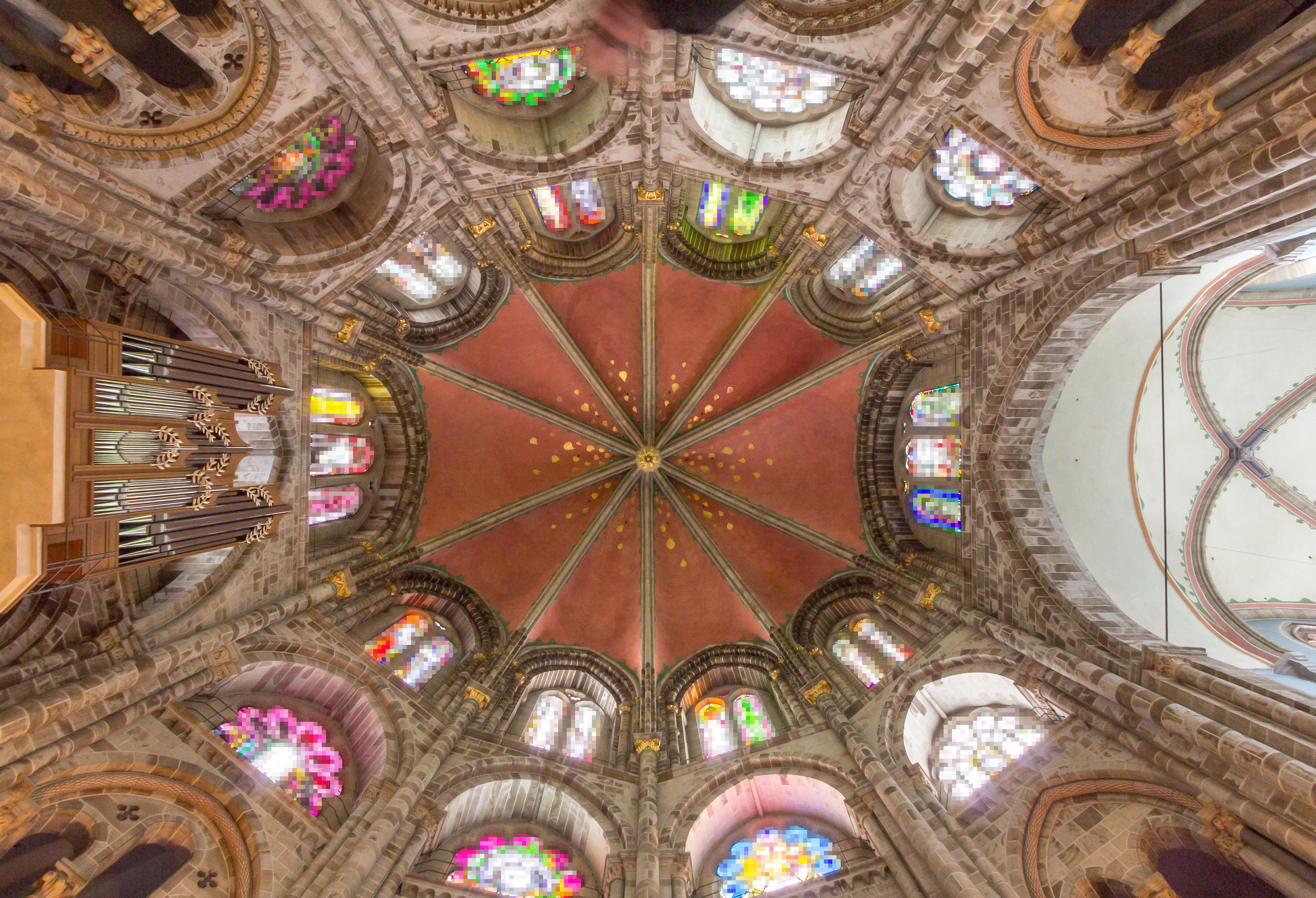
Looking into the dome of the Gothic Decagon

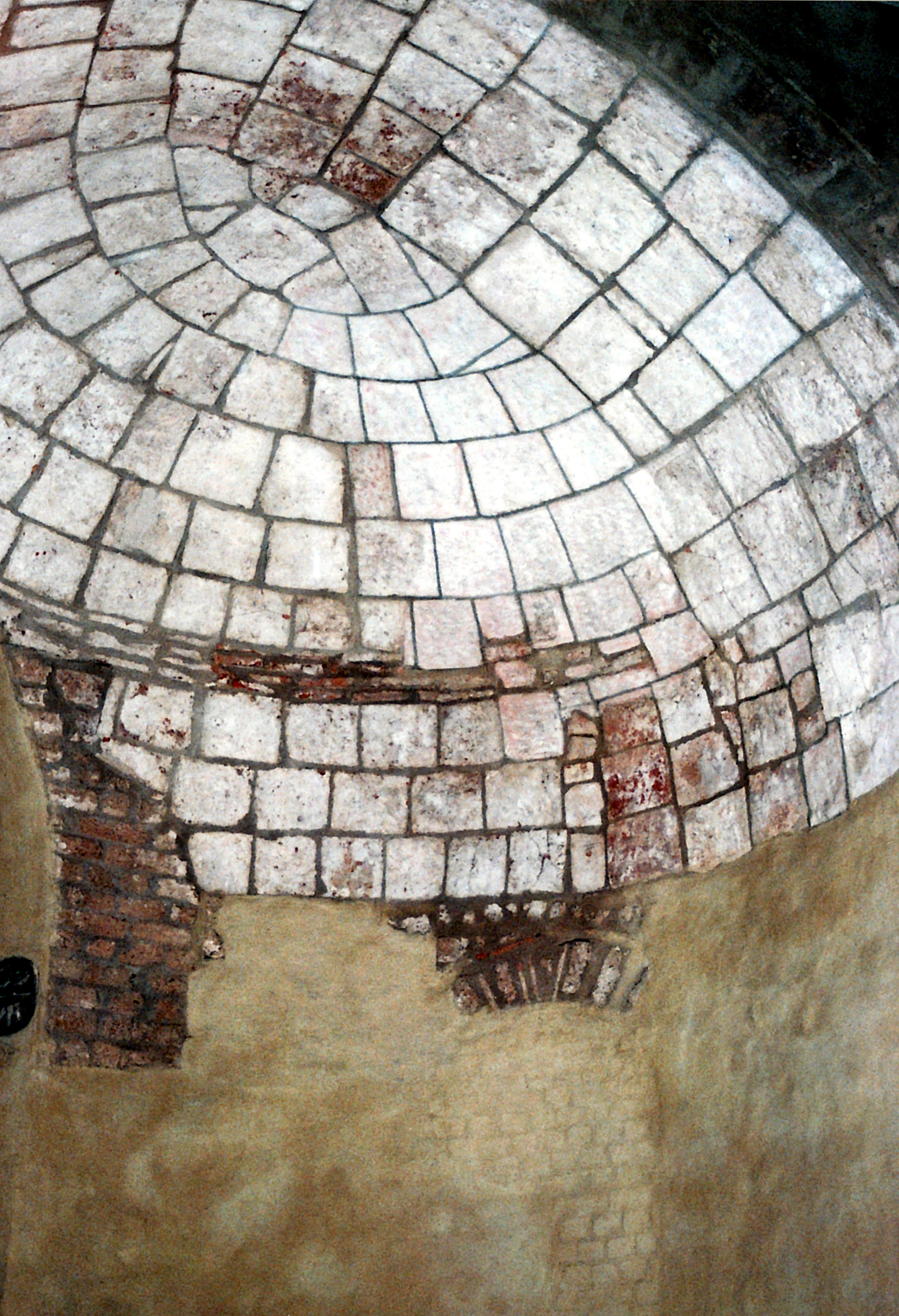
One of several preserved small late antique apses on the ground floor of the decagon with bricked-up windows. The limestone was once covered with mosaics.

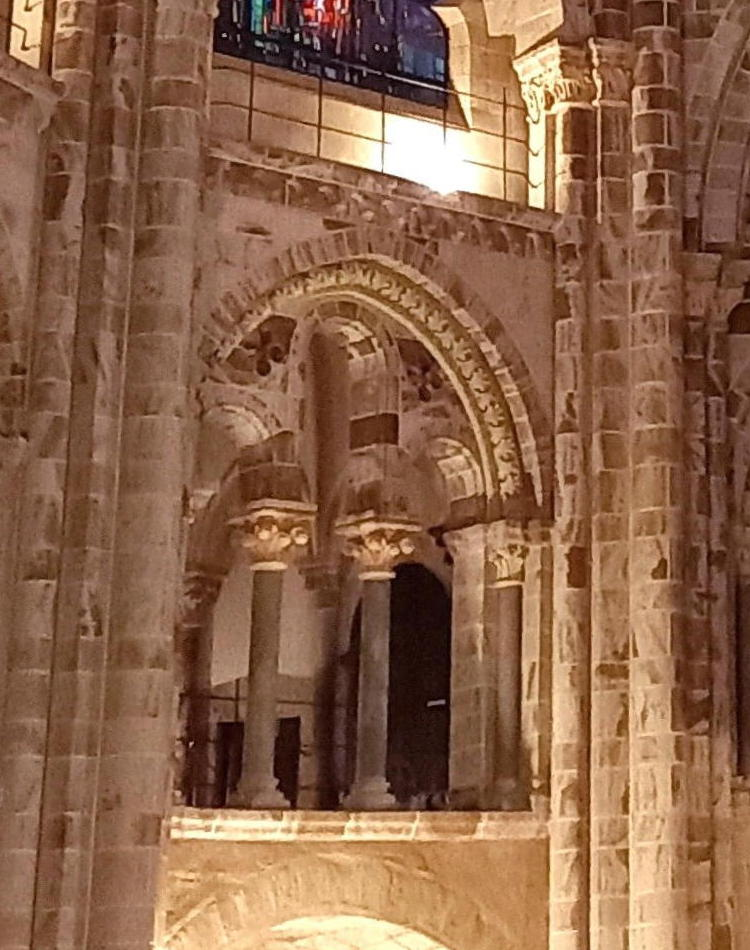
Gallery

== Sacramentary of St. Gereon ==
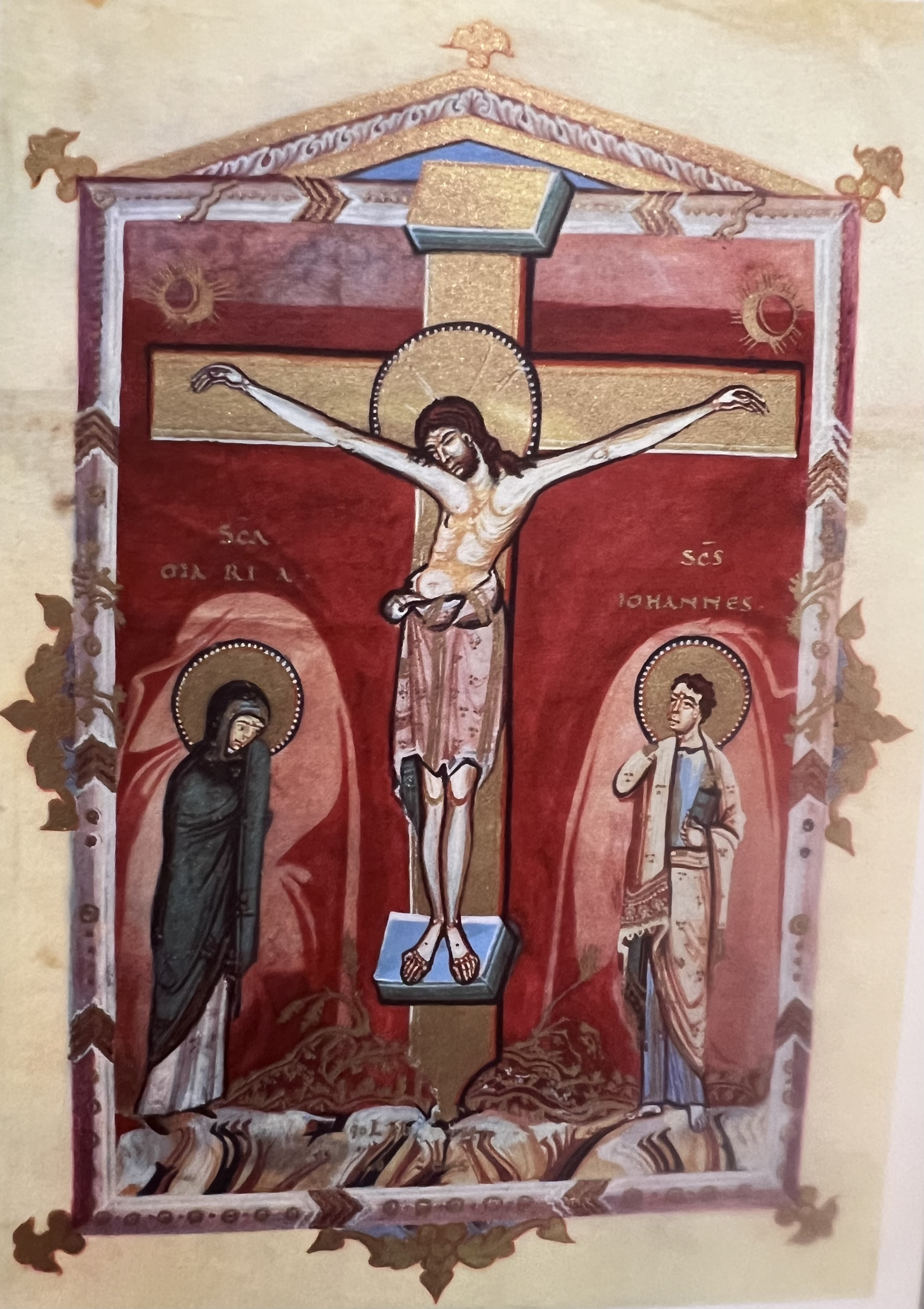
Crucifixion image from the sacramentary of St. Gereon

The sacramentary of St. Gereon is said to have been made around the year 1000 for a canon of St. Gereon in Cologne. It contains 190 parchment pages of mass prayers and a pre-stapled calendar in which the feast of Saint Gereon on October 17th and the church consecration on July 28th are mentioned. Full-page decorative pages, ten images of the history of salvation, an image of Christ enthroned and a depiction of Gregory the Great make it a major work of Ottonian illumination. In 1703 the work came to the French court. Today it is owned by the National Library in Paris with the signature latinus 817.

== Cloth of Saint Gereon ==
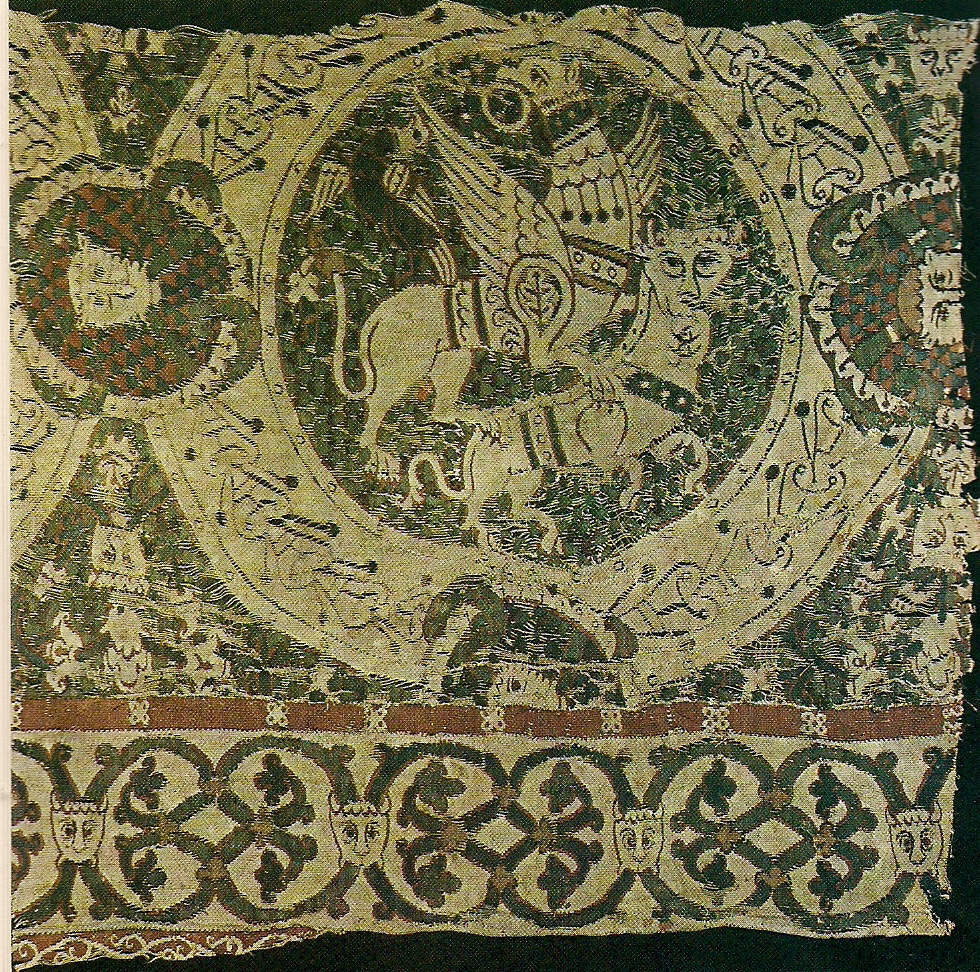
Fragment in Nuremberg

The Cloth of St Gereon, that hung in the choir area, is the oldest surviving European tapestry. It is an 11th-century tapestry that survives as fragments in several museum collections (Germanisches Nationalmuseum, Nuremberg, Kunstgewerbemuseum Berlin, Textile Arts Museum, Lyon/France, Victoria and Albert Museum, London/UK). The Cloth of Saint Gereon is thematically mainly ornamental. The London piece of border from the tapestry depicts a lion's-head mask, while other surviving fragments (in the Germanisches Nationalmuseum, Nuremberg, and the Musee des Tissus, Lyon) show a design of roundels containing griffins attacking bullocks. This motive was possibly based on an eighth century Byzantine silk found in a tomb in the Basilica of St. Ursula, Cologne. Tapestries woven in the Rhineland in the late 12th and early 13th centuries were more narrative, for example those for Halberstadt Cathedral, kept in its treasury.

== See also ==
- Twelve romanesque churches of Cologne
- List of Roman domes
- List of basilica churches in Germany
- High medieval domes
- Gereon
- Saint-Géréon, France
