= Hortense Clémentine Tanvet =

French sculptor

- Born: 19 November 1880; Mésanger
- Died: 13 February 1981 (aged 100); Nantes
- Education: Nantes École des Beaux-Arts
- Known for: Monumental sculpture

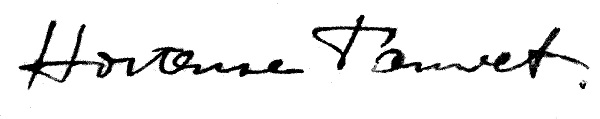
Hortense Clémentine Tanvet’s signature

Hortense Clémentine Tanvet (19 November 1880 - 13 February 1981) was a French sculptor. She produced several monuments and war memorials.

== Biography ==
Hortense Clémentine Tanvet was born in Mésanger on 19 November 1880 and died in Nantes on 13 February 1981. In 1901 she enrolled at the Nantes École des Beaux-Arts and later continued her studies in Paris.

Tanvet's recorded works are:

=== Monument to Léon Séché ===
This monument is located in Ancenis on the boulevard Léon-Séché and dates to 1925. In 1922 Charles Le Goffic headed a committee to organise a monument in Ancenis to honour Léon Séché and Hortense Tanvet was commissioned to execute the sculptural content. The work was in bronze and in 1942, during the German occupation, it was requisitioned and melted down so that the metal could be re-used. In 1957 the sculpture was renewed and placed in its present location. The inscription reads

" 1848-1914 / LÉON SÉCHÉ / HISTORIEN DU ROMANTISME"

=== Monument to Caroline Angebert ===
This monument is located in Dunkerque and involves a bronze medallion and bust by Tanvet. The casting was by the Paris foundry Montagutelli Frères and the inauguration took place on 28 October 1913. The bust is of Angebert, a great friend of Lamartine who is depicted on the medallion.

=== Guidel War Memorial ===
This 1921 memorial in Guidel has a relief sculpture by Tanvet depicting a wounded soldier lying on the ground and looking up towards an angel.

=== Plouescat War Memorial ===
This memorial stands in Plouescat's cemetery attached to the wall of the chapel. It was erected in 1922. Three types of stone were used, each having different colours: the grey granite of Quimper, the rose granite of Aber-Ildut and the black stone from Kersanton. The names of 120 men of Plouescat who gave their lives in the 1914-1918 war are listed, as well as 78 killed in the 1939-1945 war. A Victor Hugo poem is inscribed on the monument:

" Ceux qui pieusement sont morts pour la patrie/On droit qu'à leur cercueil, la foule vienne et prie/Entre les plus beaux noms, leur nom est le plus beau/Toute gloire près d'eux, passe et tombe, éphémère/Et, comme ferait une mère/La voix d'un peuple entier les berce en leur tombeau"
