= Gereon =

Soldier and martyr

Saint Gereon of Cologne
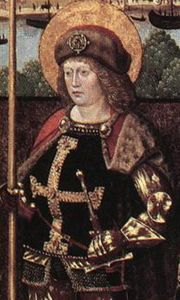

Martyr
- Born: unknown
- Died: c. 304 AD; Cologne
- Venerated in: Coptic Orthodox Church; Eastern Orthodox Church; Roman Catholicism
- Major shrine: Cologne
- Feast: October 10
- Attributes: Attire of a medieval knight or a Roman legionary

Gereon of Cologne (died c. 304), who may have been a soldier, was martyred at Cologne by beheading, probably in the early 4th century.

== Sources ==
The Roman Martyrology states that "In Cologne in Germany, the Saints Gereon and his companions, martyrs, who with sincere piety, courageously offered their necks to the sword." That brief outline is the official account of the church, that is, the martyrdom by beheading, in the famous German city, of a group of Christians headed by a certain Gereon. In fact, nothing more can be said about them with historical certainty.

== Legend ==
According to his legend, Gereon (called the "Golden Saint") was said to be a soldier of the Theban Legion. Gregory of Tours, writing in the 6th century, said that Gereon and his companions were a detachment of fifty men of the Theban Legion who were massacred at Agaunum by order of Emperor Maximian for refusing to sacrifice to pagan gods to obtain victory in battle.

Some of his companions' names are stated as being Cassius, Gregorius Maurus, Florentius, Innocentius (Innocent), Constantinus, and Victor.

Bede the Venerable mentions that their feast was included in the Sarum calendar, as well as the calendars of Barking and Durham. Later medieval legends increased the number of Gereon's companions to 290 or 319, and Norbert of Xanten is said to have discovered, through a vision, the spot at Cologne where the relics of Ursula and her companions, of Gereon, and of other martyrs lay hidden.

Gereon became a popular military saint and is often represented in art as a Roman soldier or medieval knight. Along with other saints who were beheaded, he is invoked by those suffering from migraine headaches. Hélinand of Froidmont's Martyrium mentions Saint Gereon.

== Legacy ==
St. Gereon's Basilica, in Cologne, is dedicated to him. Stefan Lochner painted a triptych in the 15th century which, in the centre piece, shows in almost life-size figures the worshipping of the Magi, and the side panels of which represent Ursula with her companions, and Gereon with his warriors. In 1810 the triptych was moved from the town hall to the choir chapel of the cathedral.

Saint-Géréon is a small town located in the department of Loire-Atlantique of the French region Pays de la Loire.

The martyr is depicted on the 13th century seal of the Convent of St. Gereon, Cologne.

== Gallery ==
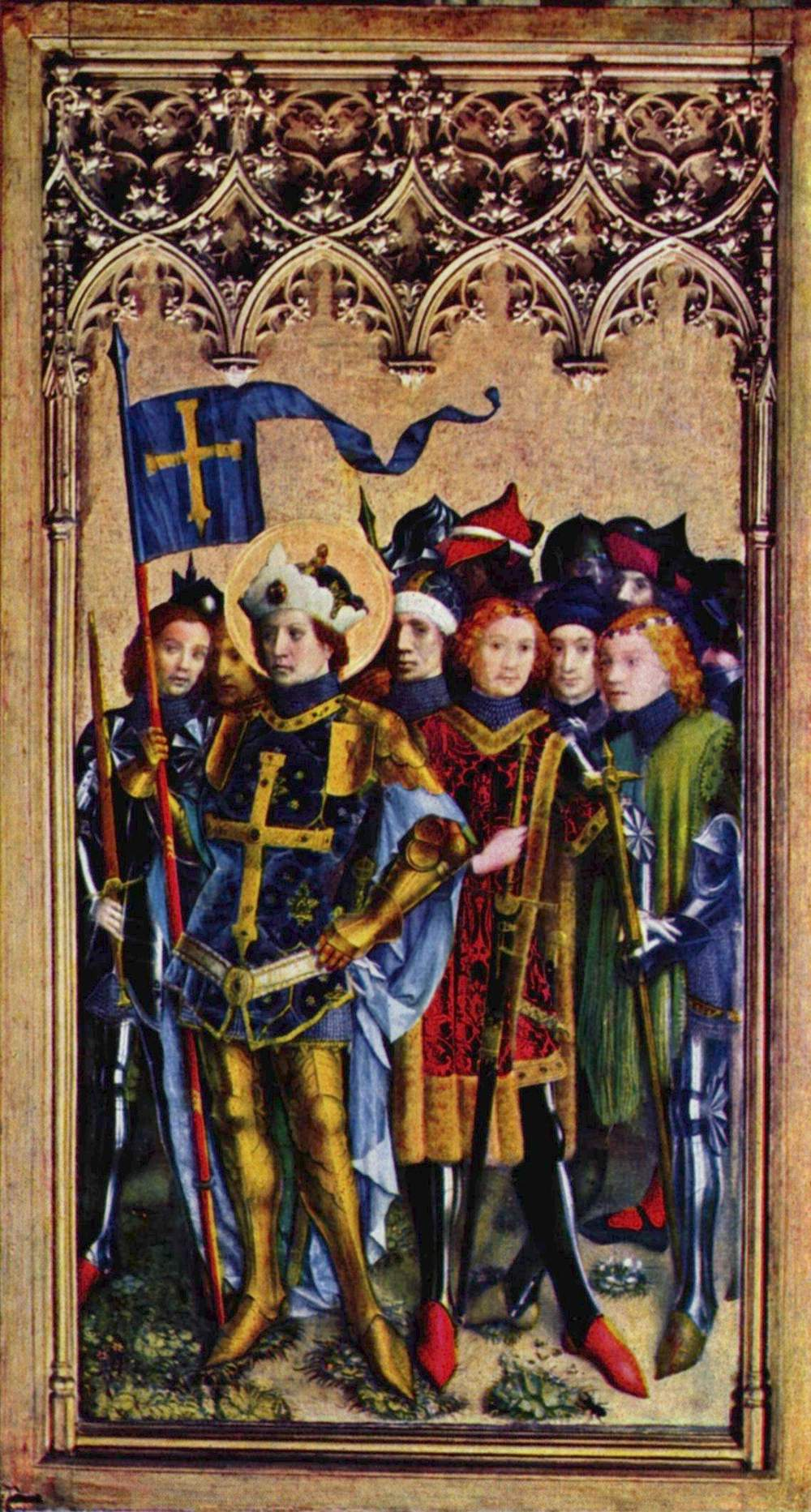
Saint Gereon with companions

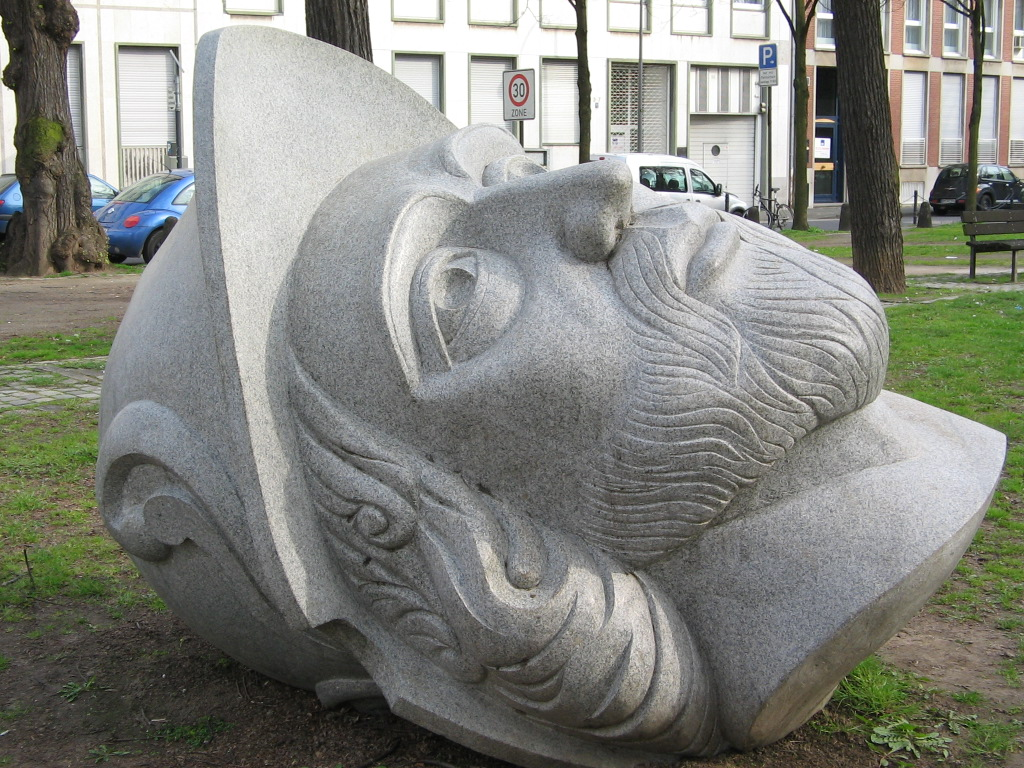
Statue of the head of Saint Gereon, outside of St. Gereon's Basilica
