= Mésanger =

Mésanger Mezanjaer (Gallo) Mezansker (Breton)
- Commune
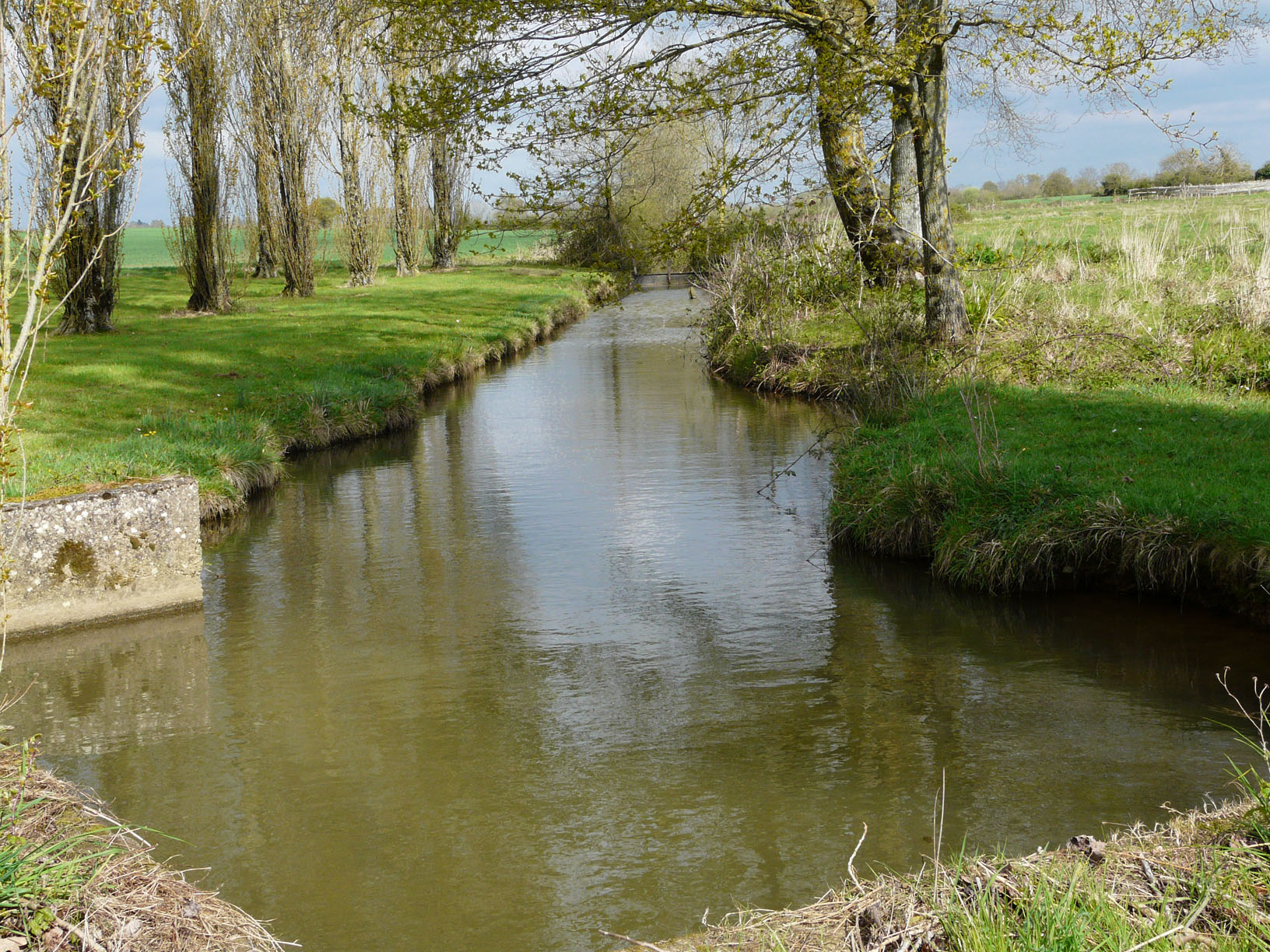
- Le Beusse Creek

- Coat of arms
- Location of Mésanger
- Location within France Location within Pays de la Loire
- Coordinates: 47°26′02″N 1°13′49″W
- Country: France
- Region: Pays de la Loire
- Department: Loire-Atlantique
- Arrondissement: Châteaubriant-Ancenis
- Canton: Ancenis-Saint-Géréon
- Intercommunality: Pays d'Ancenis

Government
  - Mayor (2020–2026): Nadine You
- Area^{1}: 49.75 km^{2} (19.21 sq mi)
- Highest elevation: 76 m (249 ft)
- Lowest elevation: 7 m (23 ft)
- Population (2023): 4,724
  - Density: 94.95/km^{2} (245.9/sq mi)
- Time zone: UTC+01:00 (CET)
  - Summer (DST): UTC+02:00 (CEST)
- INSEE/Postal code: 44096 /44522
- ^{1} French Land Register data, which excludes lakes, ponds, glaciers > 1 km^{2} (0.386 sq mi or 247 acres) and river estuaries.

Mésanger (French pronunciation: [mezɑ̃ʒe]; Gallo: Mezanjaer, Breton: Mezansker) is a commune in the Loire-Atlantique department in western France.

== Population ==
Historical population

Year	Pop.	±% p.a.
1793	2,057	—
1821	2,335	+0.45%
1846	2,607	+0.44%
1872	2,973	+0.51%
1901	2,635	−0.42%
1926	2,090	−0.92%
1946	1,905	−0.46%
1962	1,829	−0.25%
1968	1,839	+0.09%

Year	Pop.	±% p.a.
1975	2,051	+1.57%
1982	2,717	+4.10%
1990	3,068	+1.53%
1999	3,133	+0.23%
2007	4,081	+3.36%
2012	4,571	+2.29%
2017	4,687	+0.50%
2023	4,724	+0.13%

Source: EHESS and INSEE (1968-2023)

== See also ==
- Communes of the Loire-Atlantique department
- Hortense Clémentine Tanvet Sculptor born in Mésanger
