= Ancenis-Saint-Géréon =

Ancenis-Saint-Géréon Anceniz/Aunçni (Gallo) Ankiniz-Sant-Gerent (Breton)
- Commune
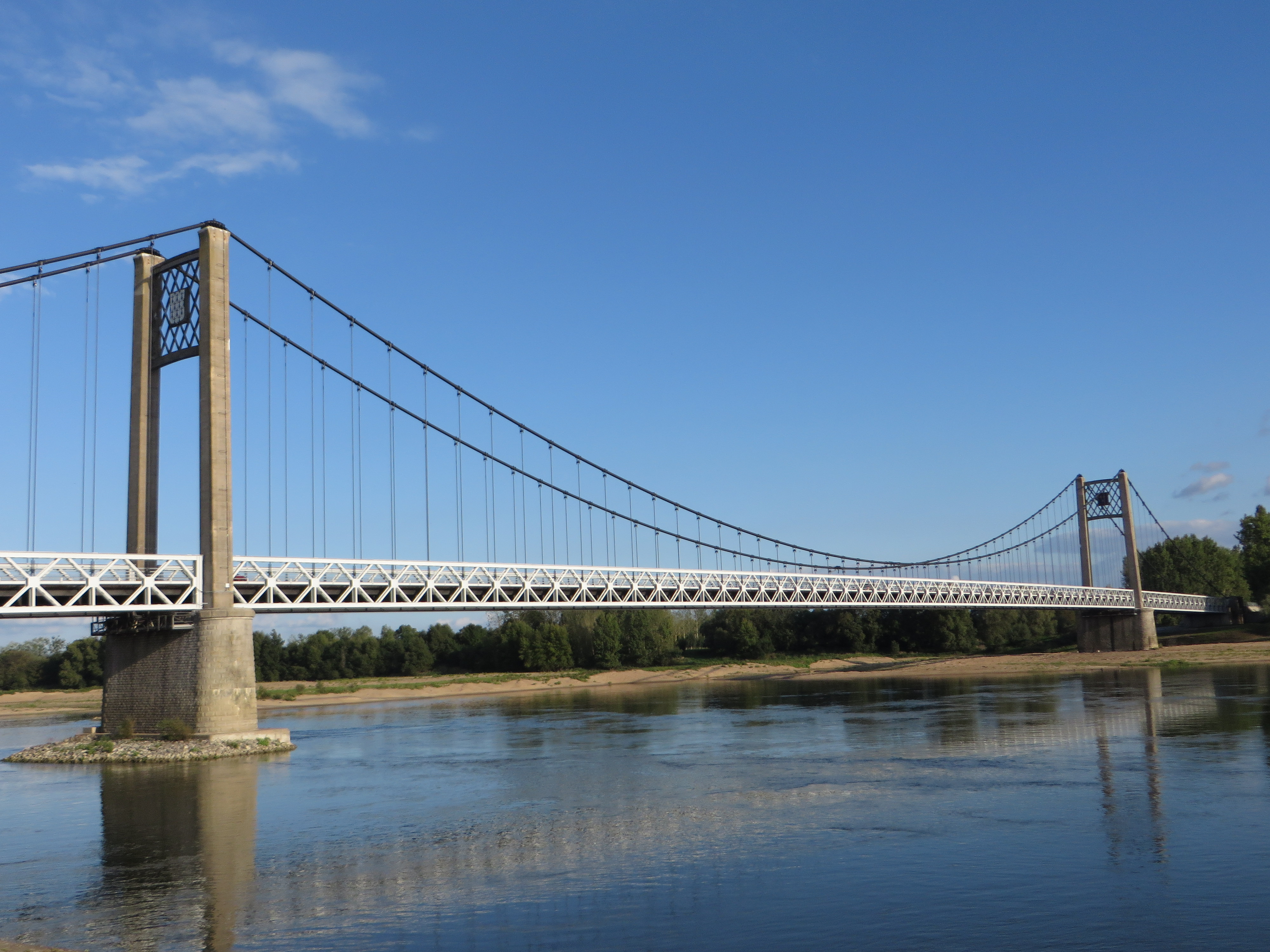
- Location of Ancenis-Saint-Géréon
- Location within France Location within Pays de la Loire
- Coordinates: 47°22′24″N 1°11′17″W
- Country: France
- Region: Pays de la Loire
- Department: Loire-Atlantique
- Arrondissement: Châteaubriant-Ancenis
- Canton: Ancenis-Saint-Géréon
- Intercommunality: Pays d'Ancenis

Government
  - Mayor (2020–2026): Rémy Orhon
- Area^{1}: 27.58 km^{2} (10.65 sq mi)
- Highest elevation: 51 m (167 ft)
- Lowest elevation: 5 m (16 ft)
- Population (2023): 11,600
  - Density: 421/km^{2} (1,090/sq mi)
- Time zone: UTC+01:00 (CET)
  - Summer (DST): UTC+02:00 (CEST)
- INSEE/Postal code: 44003 /44150
- ^{1} French Land Register data, which excludes lakes, ponds, glaciers > 1 km^{2} (0.386 sq mi or 247 acres) and river estuaries.

Ancenis-Saint-Géréon (French pronunciation: [ɑ̃sni sɛ̃ ʒeʁeɔ̃]; Gallo: Anceniz or Aunçni, Breton: Ankiniz-Sant-Gerent) is a commune in the department of Loire-Atlantique.

It was established on 1 January 2019 from the amalgamation of the communes of Ancenis and Saint-Géréon.

Chandamour is a cheese of Ancenis.

The commune is twinned with Kirkham, Lancashire in the UK.

== Population ==
Historical population
Year	Pop.	±% p.a.
1968	7,287	—
1975	8,897	+2.89%
1982	9,403	+0.79%
1990	9,258	−0.19%
1999	9,497	+0.28%
2007	10,115	+0.79%
2012	10,283	+0.33%
2017	10,802	+0.99%
2023	11,600	+1.19%
Populations of the area corresponding with the commune of Ancenis-Saint-Géréon at 1 January 2025. Source: INSEE
