= William Louiron =

French footballer (born 1978)

Personal information
- Date of birth: 13 March 1978 (age 48)
- Place of birth: Ancenis, France
- Height: 1.78 m (5 ft 10 in)
- Position: Defender

Team information
- Current team: Quevilly-Rouen (assistant manager)

Senior career*
| Years | Team | Apps | (Gls) |
| 1997–2001 | Angers | 119 | (7) |
| 2001–2002 | Grenoble | 18 | (0) |
| 2002–2004 | Reims | 44 | (1) |
| 2004–2007 | Boulogne | 97 | (8) |
| 2007– | Rouen | 164 | (8) |
- * Club domestic league appearances and goals as of 18:30, 16 June 2013 (UTC)

William Louiron (born 13 March 1978) is a French former professional footballer. He is currently assistant manager of Ligue 2 club Quevilly-Rouen. Louiron played professionally in Ligue 2 for Angers SCO, Grenoble Foot 38 and Stade Reims.
