= Ancenis =

Commune in Loire-Atlantique department, France

- Part of Ancenis-Saint-Géréon
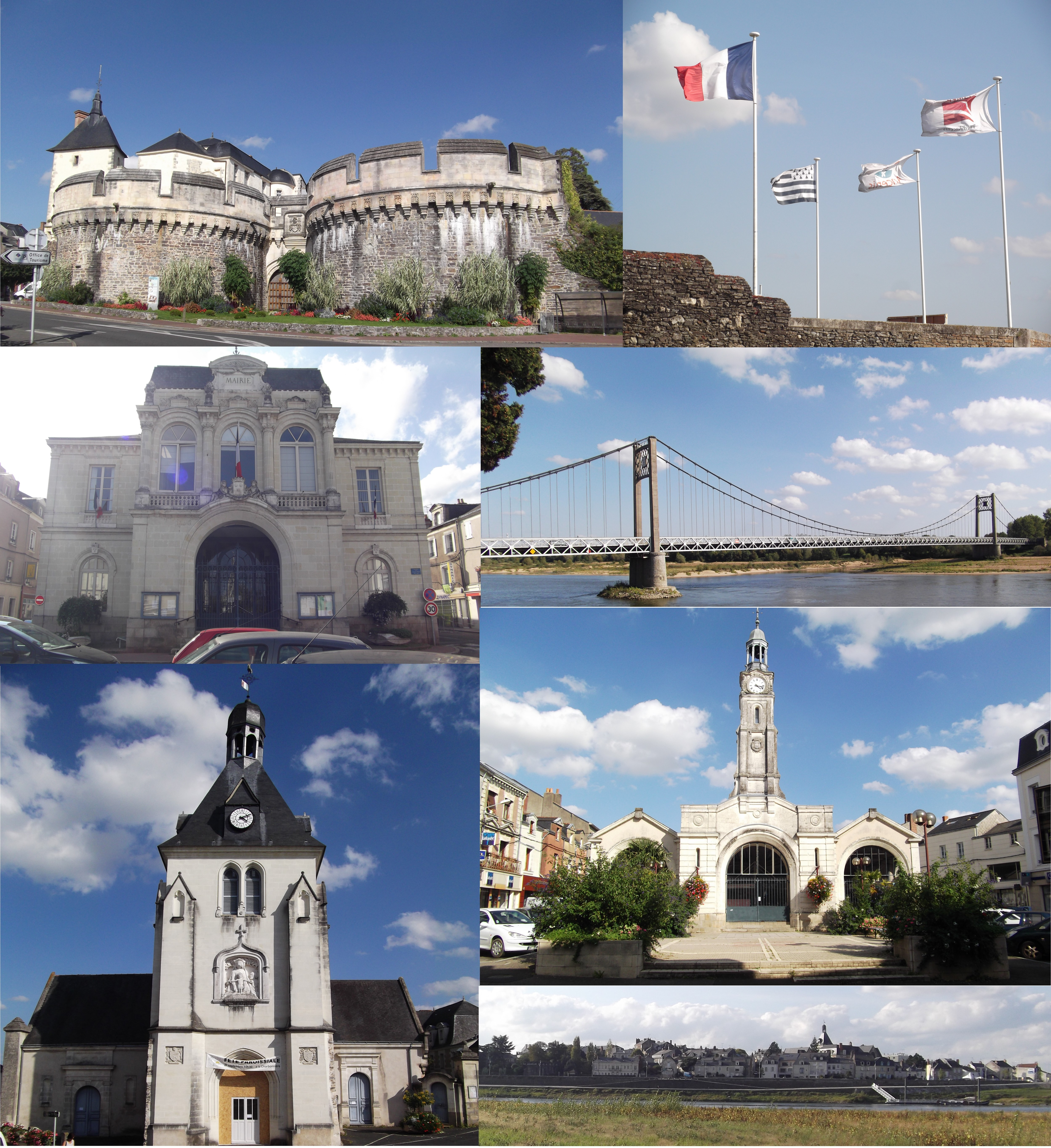
- From top to bottom, left to right: The Château d'Ancenis, the flags above the town hall, the town hall, the Ancenis Bridge, St. Peter's Church, the Halles in Ancenis, and a panoramic view of Ancenis.

- Coat of arms
- Location of Ancenis
- Location within France Location within Pays de la Loire
- Coordinates: 47°22′24″N 1°17′37″W
- Country: France
- Region: Pays de la Loire
- Department: Loire-Atlantique
- Arrondissement: Châteaubriant-Ancenis
- Canton: Ancenis-Saint-Géréon
- Commune: Ancenis-Saint-Géréon
- Area^{1}: 20.07 km^{2} (7.75 sq mi)
- Elevation: 13 m (43 ft)
- Highest elevation: 41 m (135 ft)
- Lowest elevation: 5 m (16 ft)
- Population (2016): 7,656
  - Density: 381.5/km^{2} (988.0/sq mi)
- Time zone: UTC+01:00 (CET)
  - Summer (DST): UTC+02:00 (CEST)
- Postal code: 44150
- ^{1} French Land Register data, which excludes lakes, ponds, glaciers > 1 km^{2} (0.386 sq mi or 247 acres) and river estuaries.

Ancenis (French pronunciation: [ɑ̃s.ni]; Breton: Ankiniz) is a former commune in the Loire-Atlantique department in western France. On 1 January 2019, it was merged into the new commune Ancenis-Saint-Géréon. It is a former sub-prefecture of the department, and was the seat of the former arrondissement of Ancenis.

It played a great historical role as a key location on the road to Nantes (23 miles to the southwest), the historical capital of Brittany. It was named "the key of Brittany" and the door of Brittany.

== Population ==
Historical population

Year	Pop.	±% p.a.
1793	3,295	—
1800	2,923	−1.70%
1806	2,945	+0.13%
1821	3,888	+1.87%
1831	3,749	−0.36%
1841	3,802	+0.14%
1846	3,824	+0.12%
1851	3,689	−0.72%
1856	4,198	+2.62%
1861	4,628	+1.97%
1866	4,148	−2.17%
1872	4,358	+0.83%
1876	5,177	+4.40%
1881	5,361	+0.70%
1886	5,544	+0.67%
1891	5,141	−1.50%
1896	5,048	−0.36%
1901	5,199	+0.59%

Year	Pop.	±% p.a.
1906	4,998	−0.79%
1911	5,013	+0.06%
1921	4,222	−1.70%
1926	3,942	−1.36%
1931	4,040	+0.49%
1936	4,149	+0.53%
1946	4,815	+1.50%
1954	5,050	+0.60%
1962	5,102	+0.13%
1968	5,648	+1.71%
1975	6,997	+3.11%
1982	7,076	+0.16%
1990	6,896	−0.32%
1999	7,010	+0.18%
2007	7,459	+0.78%
2012	7,504	+0.12%
2016	7,656	+0.50%

Source: EHESS and INSEE

== Sights ==
- Château d'Ancenis, a medieval and Renaissance castle
- The Loire river on which Ancenis is located (on the north bank)
- Church of Saint Peter, 15-16-17th century
- Chapel of the Ursulines
- Chapel Notre-Dame de Délivrance
- Old quarter with mediaeval houses
- Dolmen at Pierre-Couvretière

== Sport ==
The soccer team is called RCA 44, (Racing Club D'Ancenis 44)

== Personalities ==
- William Louiron, footballer
- Henri Ottmann, painter
- Léon Séché, poet and writer
- Jordan Veretout, French footballer
- Jules Roussel, racing driver

== Twin towns ==
Ancenis is twinned with both the town of Kirkham in Lancashire, UK and Bad Brückenau, a spa town in Bad Kissingen district, northern Bavaria which is situated in the Rhön Mountains in Germany.

== See also ==
- Communes of the Loire-Atlantique department
- Hortense Clémentine Tanvet Sculptor
