= Plouescat =

Plouescat Ploueskad
- Commune
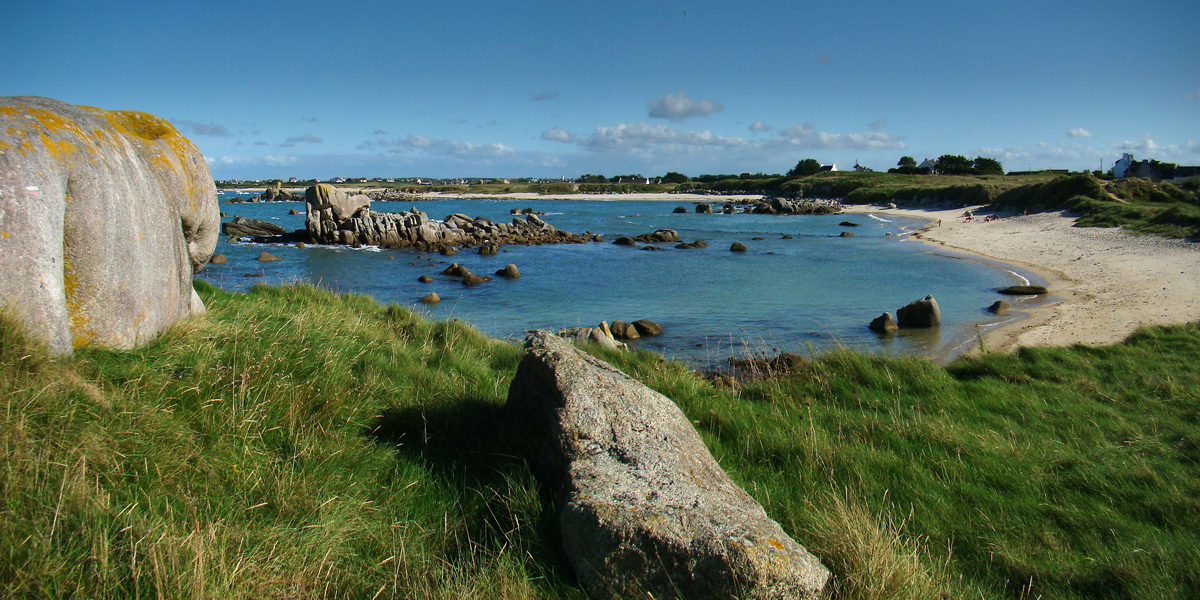
- The sea shore near Plouescat

- Coat of arms
- Location of Plouescat
- Location within France Location within Brittany
- Coordinates: 48°39′28″N 4°10′24″W
- Country: France
- Region: Brittany
- Department: Finistère
- Arrondissement: Morlaix
- Canton: Saint-Pol-de-Léon
- Intercommunality: Haut-Léon Communauté

Government
  - Mayor (2020–2026): Eric Le Bour
- Area^{1}: 14.79 km^{2} (5.71 sq mi)
- Highest elevation: 56 m (184 ft)
- Lowest elevation: 0 m (0 ft)
- Population (2023): 3,554
  - Density: 240.3/km^{2} (622.4/sq mi)
- Time zone: UTC+01:00 (CET)
  - Summer (DST): UTC+02:00 (CEST)
- INSEE/Postal code: 29185 /29430
- ^{1} French Land Register data, which excludes lakes, ponds, glaciers > 1 km^{2} (0.386 sq mi or 247 acres) and river estuaries.

Plouescat (French pronunciation: [pluɛskat]; Breton: Ploueskad) is a commune in the Finistère department of Brittany in north-western France. It is a seaside resort, complete with a casino and a large camping and caravanning site, adjacent to its extensive beach of fine, powdery sand. The region is largely agricultural, specialising in artichokes, onions, cauliflowers and potatoes.

== Geography ==
Plouescat (Ploueskad), capital of the canton, is part of the district of Morlaix. It is a town in northern Finistère (Penn-ar-Bed), located on the edge of the English Channel, in the country of Léon, on the "Côte des Sables", on the edge of the "Côte des Légendes".

It is separated from Plounévez-Lochrist (Gwinevez) by the Keralle, a small coastal river which rises in Saint-Vougay and flows into the Baie du Kernic, in Pont-Christ en Plouescat; to the east, the town borders Cléder.

The communal finage forms, at least in its western part, a peninsula limited to the north by the English Channel and by Anse du Kernite the south; its western peak lies at Porz Meur.

== Population ==
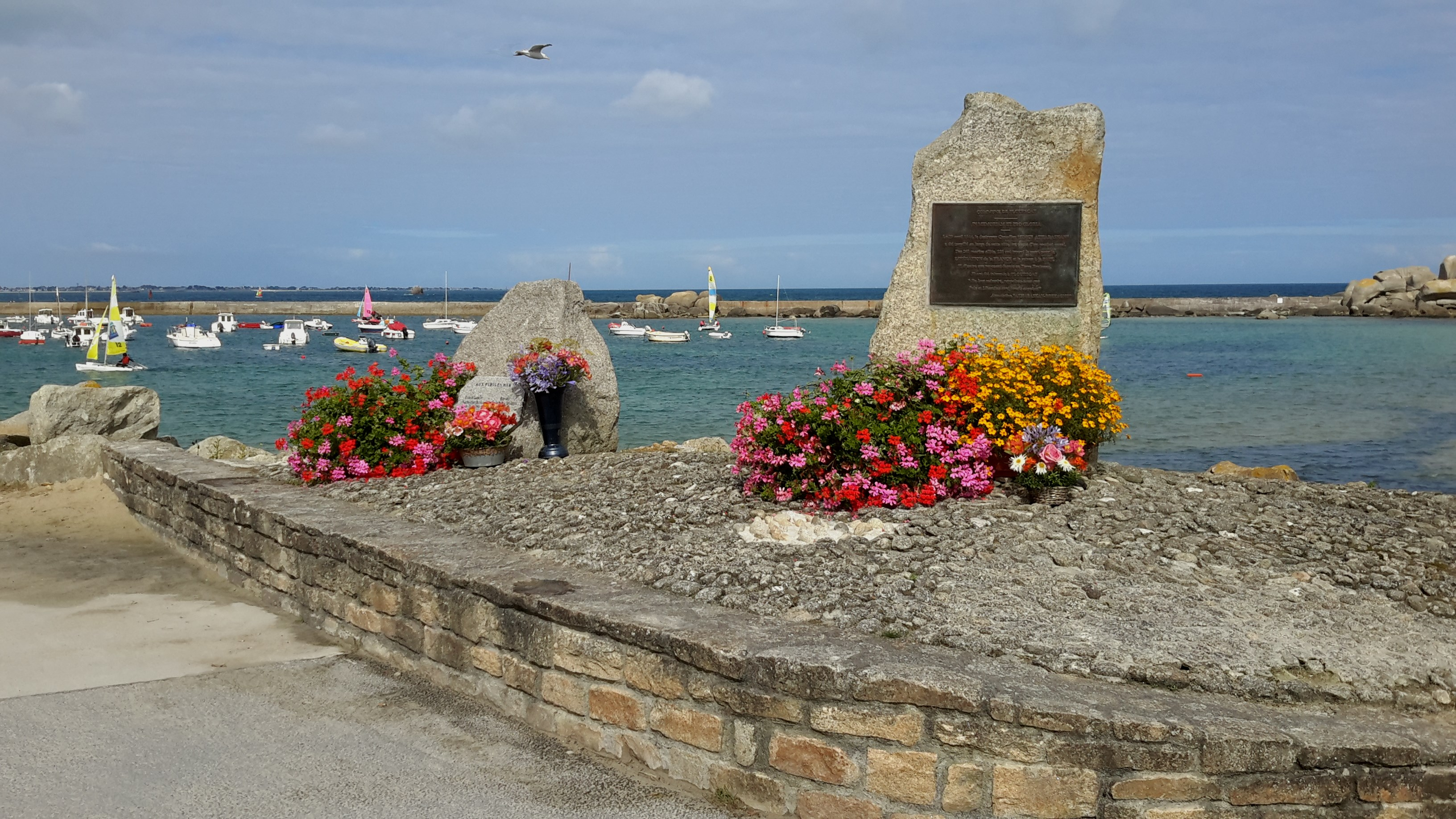
Port de Porsguen

Inhabitants of Plouescat are called in French Plouescatais.

Historical population

Year	Pop.	±% p.a.
1793	2,118	—
1800	2,124	+0.04%
1806	2,407	+2.11%
1821	2,396	−0.03%
1831	3,017	+2.33%
1836	3,238	+1.42%
1841	3,314	+0.47%
1846	3,467	+0.91%
1851	3,180	−1.71%
1856	3,003	−1.14%
1861	3,082	+0.52%
1866	3,176	+0.60%
1872	3,095	−0.43%
1876	3,167	+0.58%
1881	3,148	−0.12%
1886	3,069	−0.51%
1891	2,983	−0.57%
1896	3,095	+0.74%
1901	3,145	+0.32%

Year	Pop.	±% p.a.
1906	3,382	+1.46%
1911	3,526	+0.84%
1921	3,582	+0.16%
1926	3,866	+1.54%
1931	4,002	+0.69%
1936	4,137	+0.67%
1946	4,224	+0.21%
1954	4,131	−0.28%
1962	4,042	−0.27%
1968	4,003	−0.16%
1975	4,008	+0.02%
1982	3,935	−0.26%
1990	3,689	−0.80%
1999	3,660	−0.09%
2007	3,778	+0.40%
2012	3,600	−0.96%
2017	3,446	−0.87%
2023	3,554	+0.52%

Source: EHESS and INSEE (1968–2023)

== Breton language ==
In 2008, 17.02% of primary-school children attended bilingual schools.

== Sights ==
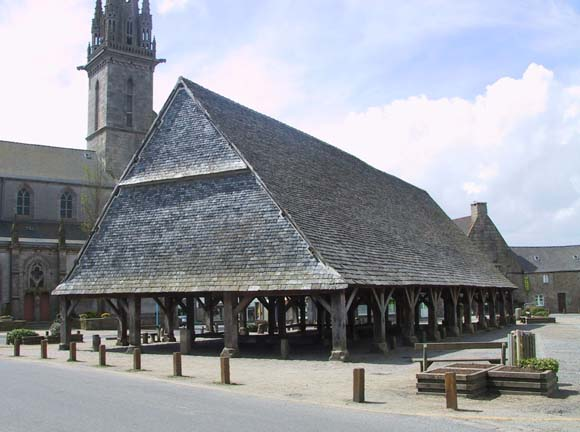
Les halles of Plouescat

In the centre of the village is Les Halles - a remarkable timber-framed market hall dating from the early 15th Century which has been classified by the French Ministry of Culture as a Monument historique since 1915.

The route of a former railway line provided the foundation for a new road, called Le boulevard de l'Europe, which by-passes Plouescat on its southern side.

- Gallic Stelae : The stelae are the work of Celtic tribes dating from the second Iron Age (between 450 BC and the beginning of the Christian era). Two types of stelae can be distinguished: low, ovoid stelae like the one from Gorré Bloué, and tall stelae, more numerous in Plouescat, which are generally columnar with 4 to 16 facets.
- Gallo-Roman Baths : The baths at Gorré Bloué, built around the 4th century AD, are among them. The building originally measured 15 m by 13 m and had 9 rooms, each with a specific function (central open-air room, tepidarium, hot and cold rooms, boiler room, etc.).

== International relations ==
Plouescat is twinned with:

- (United Kingdom) Braunton, England

== See also ==
- Communes of the Finistère department
- Hortense Clémentine Tanvet Sculptor of war memorial
