= Guidel =

Commune in Brittany, France

Guidel Gwidel
- Commune
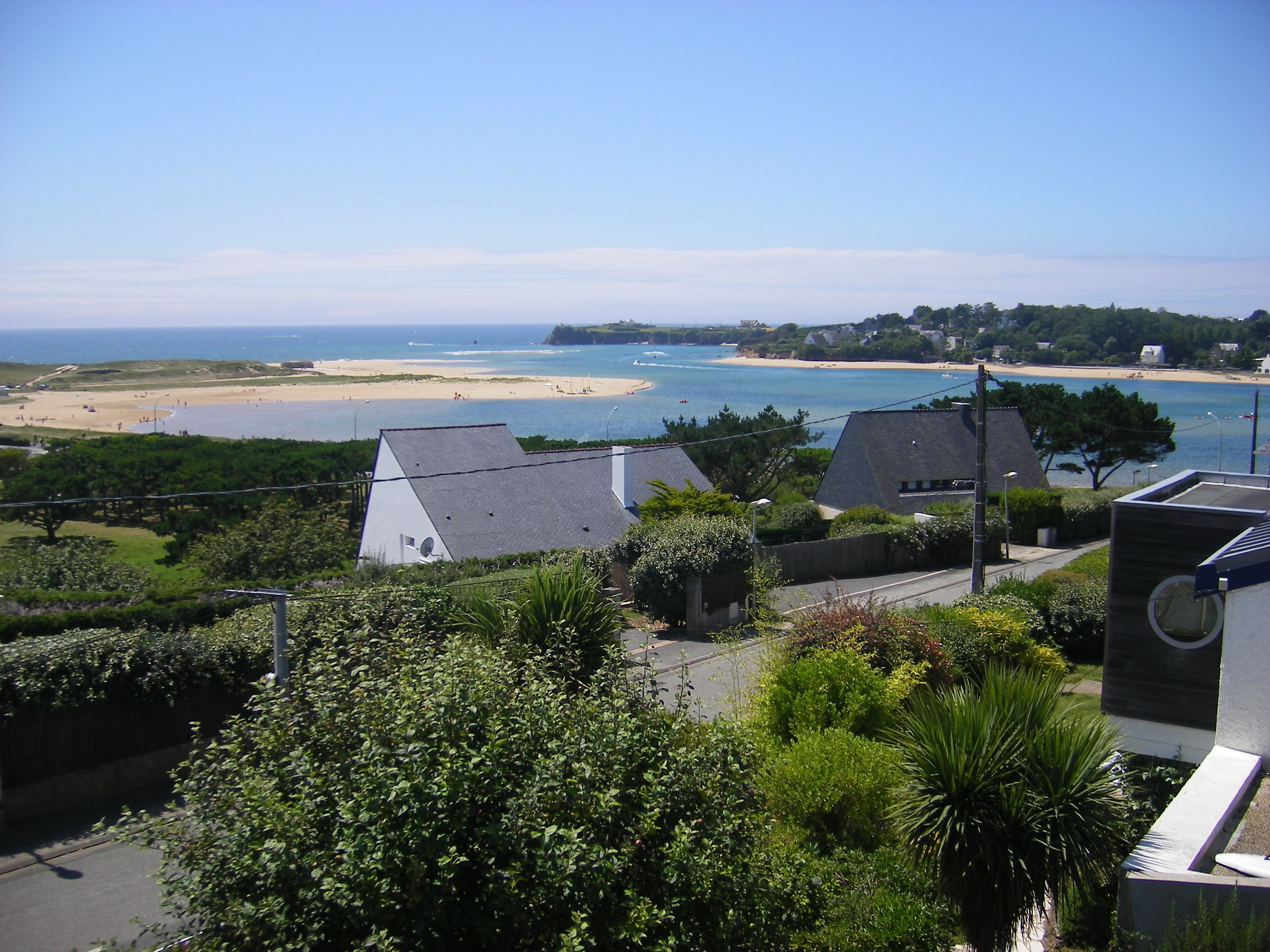
- The beach at Guidel, and the Laïta

- Coat of arms
- Location of Guidel
- Location within France Location within Brittany
- Coordinates: 47°47′29″N 3°29′14″W
- Country: France
- Region: Brittany
- Department: Morbihan
- Arrondissement: Lorient
- Canton: Guidel
- Intercommunality: Lorient Agglomération

Government
  - Mayor (2026–32): Régis Kerdelhué
- Area^{1}: 52.29 km^{2} (20.19 sq mi)
- Highest elevation: 70 m (230 ft)
- Lowest elevation: 0 m (0 ft)
- Population (2023): 12,338
  - Density: 236.0/km^{2} (611.1/sq mi)
- Time zone: UTC+01:00 (CET)
  - Summer (DST): UTC+02:00 (CEST)
- INSEE/Postal code: 56078 /56520
- ^{1} French Land Register data, which excludes lakes, ponds, glaciers > 1 km^{2} (0.386 sq mi or 247 acres) and river estuaries.

Guidel (French pronunciation: [gidɛl]; Breton: Gwidel) is a commune in the Morbihan department of Brittany in north-western France. Inhabitants of Guidel are called in French Guidélois.

== Population ==
Historical population
Year	Pop.	±% p.a.
1968	3,367	—
1975	4,163	+3.08%
1982	6,071	+5.54%
1990	8,241	+3.89%
1999	9,156	+1.18%
2007	9,973	+1.07%
2012	10,279	+0.61%
2017	11,550	+2.36%
2023	12,338	+1.11%
Source: INSEE

== Cemetery ==
The communal cemetery, containing 108 tombs from the World War II, has been listed by the Commonwealth War Graves Commission. Most of the casualties were belonging to the Royal Air Force, Royal Canadian Air Force, Royal Australian Air Force and Royal New Zealand Air Force.

== Breton language ==
The municipality launched a linguistic plan through Ya d'ar brezhoneg on 27 March 2007.

In 2008, there was 6,44% of the children attended the bilingual schools in primary education.

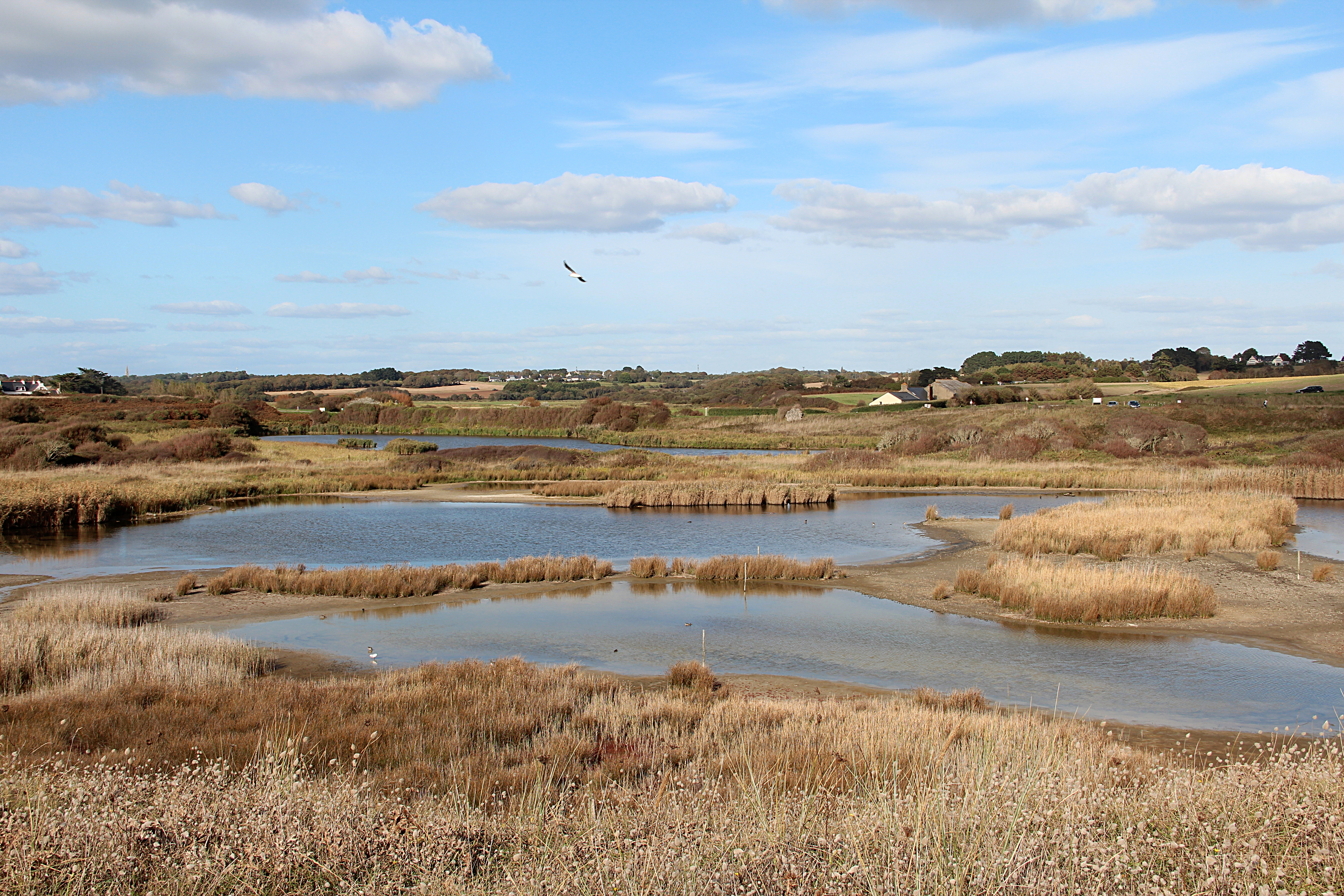
Ponds of Petit and Grand Loc'h

== See also ==
- Communes of the Morbihan department
- Hortense Clémentine Tanvet Sculptor of war memorial
