= Saint-Géréon =

Commune in Loire-Atlantique, France

- Part of Ancenis-Saint-Géréon
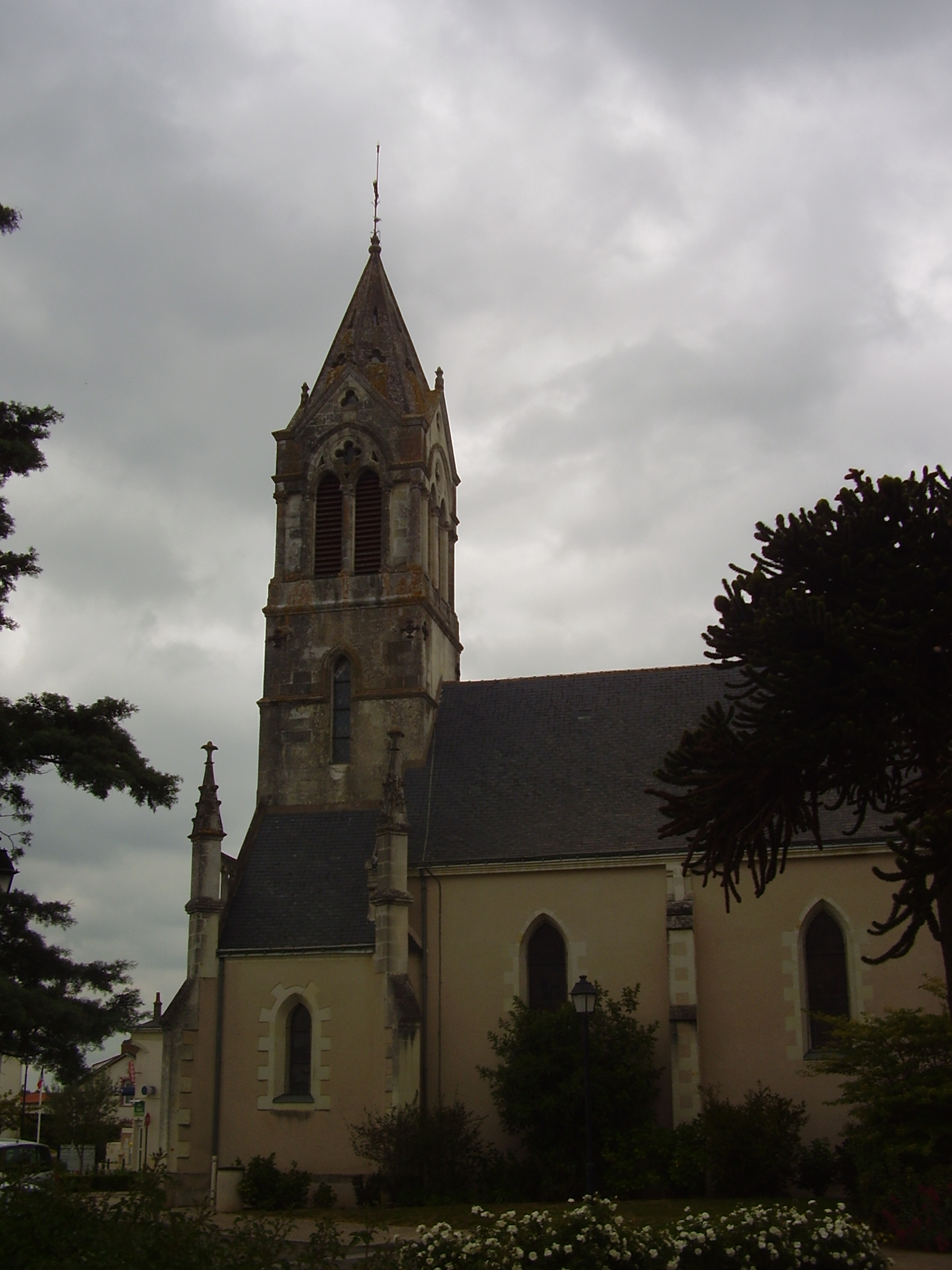
- The church in Saint-Géréon

- Coat of arms
- Location of Saint-Géréon
- Location within France Location within Pays de la Loire
- Coordinates: 47°22′12″N 1°11′50″W
- Country: France
- Region: Pays de la Loire
- Department: Loire-Atlantique
- Arrondissement: Châteaubriant-Ancenis
- Canton: Ancenis-Saint-Géréon
- Commune: Ancenis-Saint-Géréon
- Area^{1}: 7.51 km^{2} (2.90 sq mi)
- Elevation: 28 m (92 ft)
- Highest elevation: 51 m (167 ft)
- Lowest elevation: 6 m (20 ft)
- Population (2016): 2,939
  - Density: 391/km^{2} (1,010/sq mi)
- Time zone: UTC+01:00 (CET)
  - Summer (DST): UTC+02:00 (CEST)
- Postal code: 44150
- ^{1} French Land Register data, which excludes lakes, ponds, glaciers > 1 km^{2} (0.386 sq mi or 247 acres) and river estuaries.

Saint-Géréon (French pronunciation: [sɛ̃ ʒeʁeɔ̃]; Breton: Sant-Jeron) is a former commune in the Loire-Atlantique department in western France. On 1 January 2019, it was merged into the new commune of Ancenis-Saint-Géréon.

== See also ==
- Communes of the Loire-Atlantique department
- Gereon
