= Léon Séché =

French poet (1848–1914)

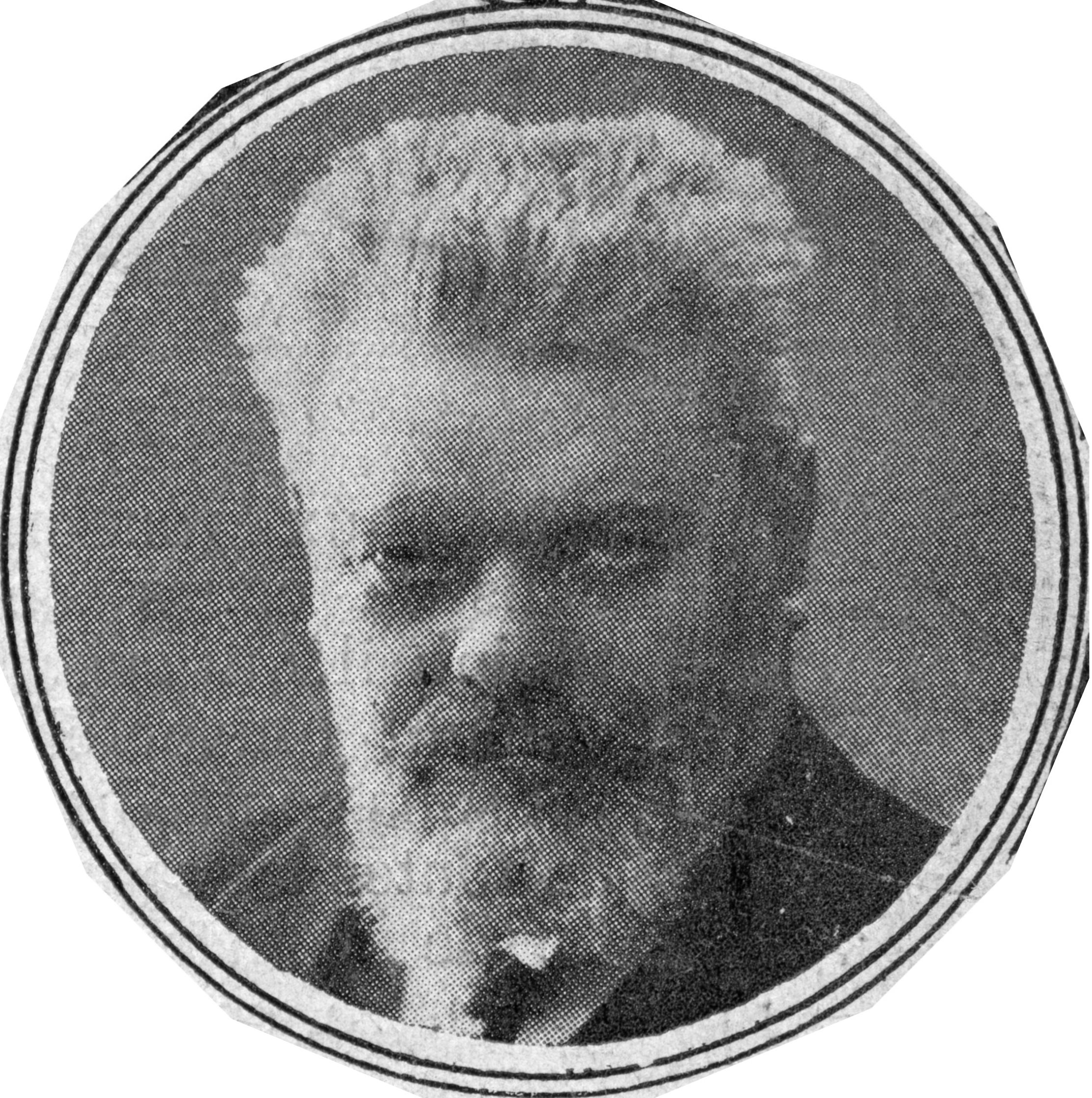
Léon Séché by Henri Manuel

Léon Séché (3 April 1848 - 5 May 1914) was a French poet.

== Biography ==
Léon Séché was born in Ancenis.

In 1869 he moved to Paris and in 1890 he founded the Revue des Provinces de l'Ouest; he continued as editor of the revue.

He died in Nice.

A street in Ancenis is named after him.

== Works ==
His works include;

- Les griffes du lion (1871)
- Rose Epoudry, Roman, 1881.
- La Chanson de la vie, poésies. Couronné par l’Académie Française, Didier, 1889.
- Les derniers jansénistes, depuis la ruine de Port-Royal jusqu'à nos jours, 3 tomes, 1891, Couronné par l’Académie française.
- Les origines du concordat (1894)
- Éducateurs et moralistes, Delagrave, 1895.
- Jules Simon, 1814-1896, Figures bretonnes, E. Lechevalier, 1898.
- Port Royal des Champs, Petit manuel du pèlerin, suivi par Racine au Port-Royal, L Chevalier, 1899.
- Les œuvres poétiques de Jacques Pelletier du Mans, Revue de la Renaissance, 1904.
- Honoré de Balzac et ses démêlés avec Sainte-Beuve à propos de Port-Royal, Le Mercure de France, Paris, 1904.
- Revue de la Renaissance, organe interne des amis du XVIe et de la Pléiade, paraissant sous la direction de Léon Séché. Couronné par l’Académie française.
- Le Petit Lyré de Joachim du Bellay, Didier, 1879.
- Contes et Figures de mon pays, Dentu, 1881.
- Œuvres choisies de Joachim du Bellay, Ed. du Monument, 1894.
- En collaboration, La Fête de Joachim du Bellay à Ancenis, 2 septembre 1894, P., Librairie historique des Provinces, 1894.
- Joachim du Bellay et la Bretagne angevine (Recherches sur la Pléiade, I), illustrations de Jacques Pohier, P. Lechevalier, 1900.
- Joachim du Bellay, La défense de la langue française, Préface de Léon Séché, 1904.
- Alfred de Vigny, couronné par l’Académie française, F. Juven, 1902.
- Sainte-Beuve, son esprit, ses idées, ses mœurs, Mercure de France, 1904.
- Correspondance inédite de Sainte-Beuve avec M.et Mme Juste Olivier, Mercure de France, 1904.
- Lamartine, de 1816 à 1830. Elvire et les Méditations, Mercure de France, 1905.
- Victor Hugo et les Poètes I, Le Cénacle de Joseph Delorme, Mercure de France, 1906.
- Alfred de Vigny I, La vie littéraire, Mercure de France, 1906.
- Alfred de Musset I L’homme et l’œuvre, les camarades (documents inédits), Mercure de France, 1907.
- Alfred de Musset II Les Femmes, Mercure de France, 1907.
- Correspondance d’Alfred de Musset, 1827-1857, Mercure de France, 1907.
- Lettres inédites d’Hortense Allart de Méritens à Sainte-Beuve, Muses romantiques, Mercure de France, 1908.
- Hortense Allart de Méritens, dans ses rapports avec Chateaubriand, Béranger, Lamennais,Sainte-Beuve, G.Sand et Mme d’Agoult, Muses romantiques, Mercure de France, 1908.
- Mme d’Arbouville, d’après sa correspondance avec Sainte-Beuve, Mercure de France, 1909.
- Le Roman de Lamartine, Fayard, 1909.
- Le Cénacle de la Muse française, 1823-1827, Mercure de France, 1909.
- Victor Hugo et les Artistes II, Le Cénacle de Joseph Delorme, Mercure de France, 1910.
- Lettres d’amour d’Alfred de Musset à Aimée d’Alton, Mercure de France, 1910.
- Delphine Gray (Mme Girardin) dans ses rapports avec Lamartine, Victor Hugo, Balzac, Rachel, Jules Sandeau, Dumas, Eugène Sue et G.Sand, Muses romantiques, Mercure de France, 1910.
- La jeunesse dorée sous Louis Philippe, Mercure de France, 1910.
- Les Amitiés de Lamartine, Mercure de France, 1911.
- Alfred de Vigny II La vie amoureuse, Mercure de France, 1913.
