= Anton Josef Reiss =

German sculptor (1835–1900)

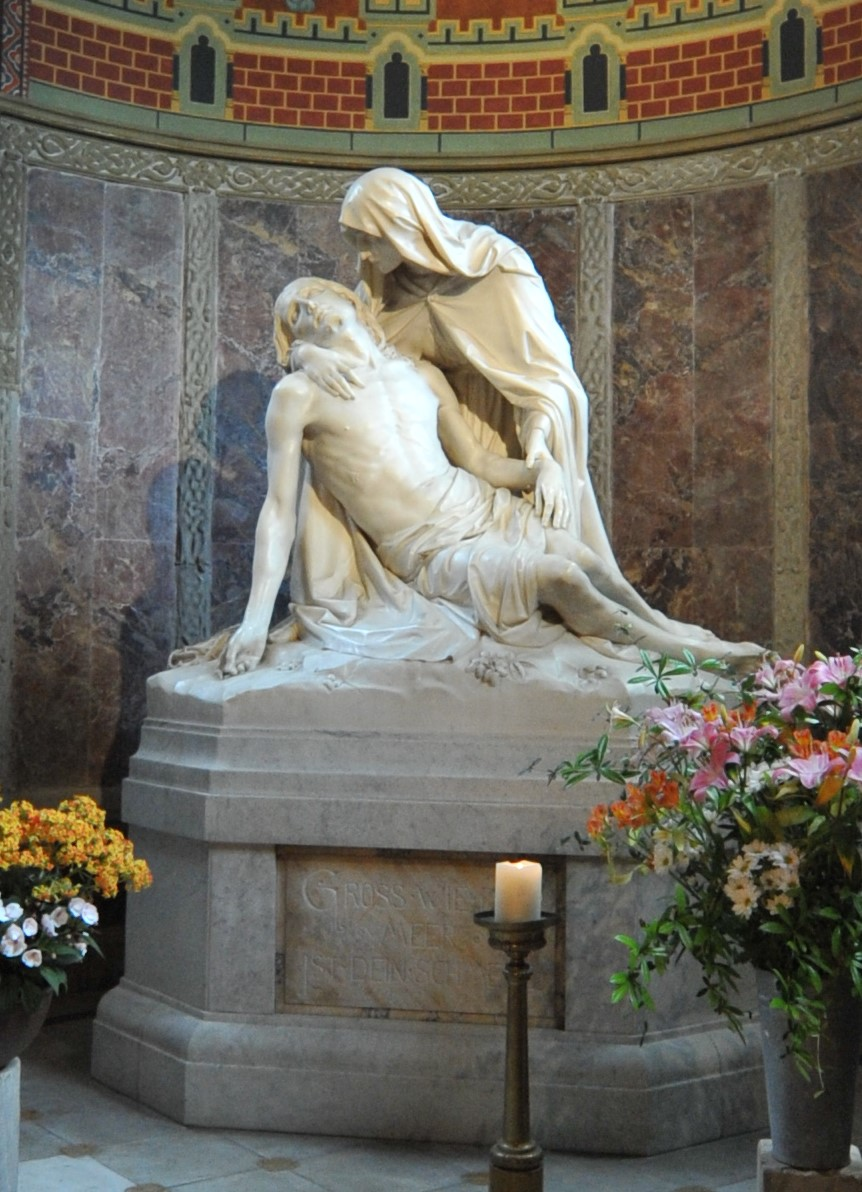
- Pietà by Reiss in St. Gereon
- Born: 30 October 1835; Düsseldorf
- Died: 1 February 1900 (aged 64)
- Education: Kunstakademie Düsseldorf
- Occupation: Sculptor

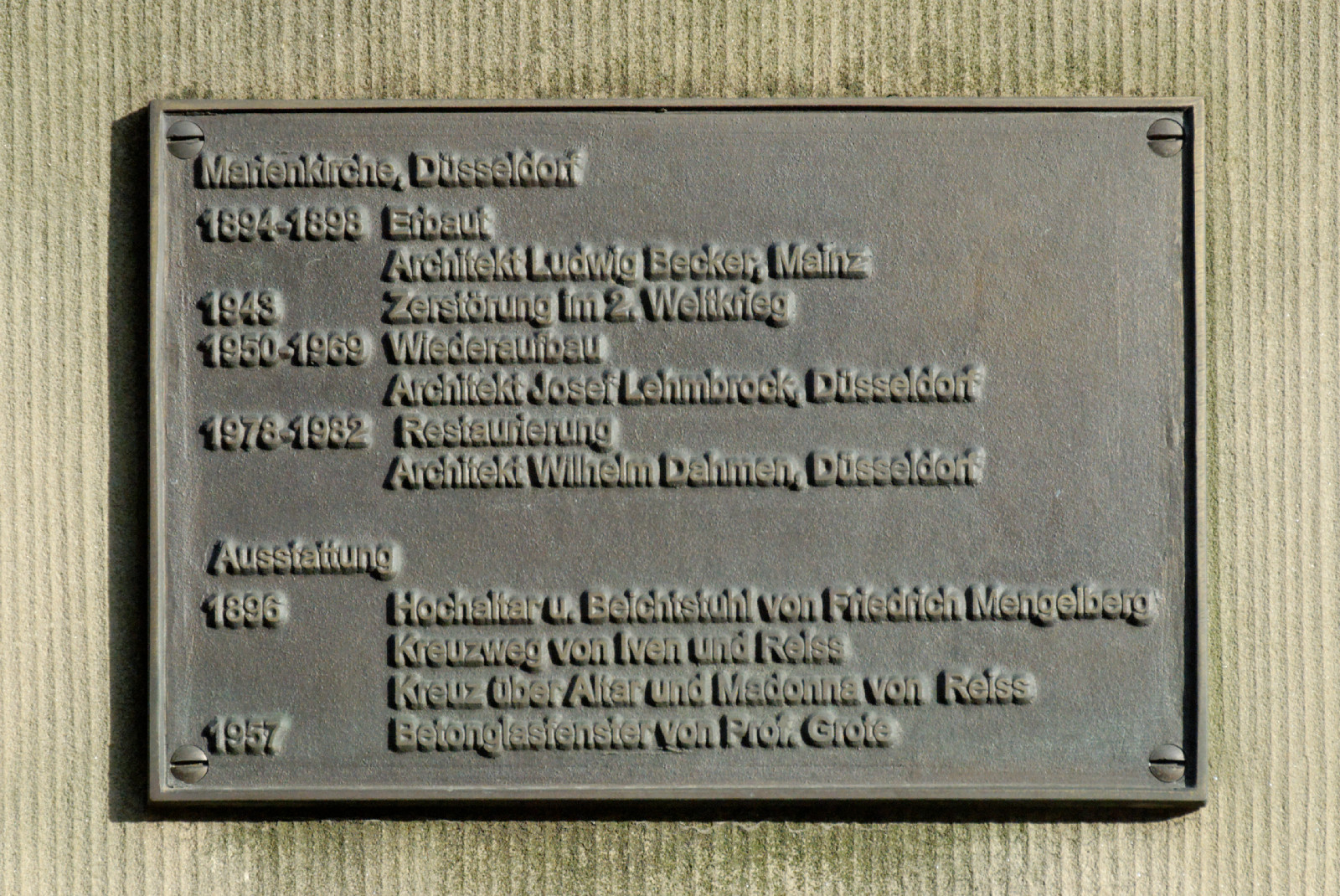
Memorial plaque at St. Mariä Empfängnis in Düsseldorf

Anton Josef Reiss, also Reiß (30 October 1835 – 1 February 1900) was a German sculptor. Based in Düsseldorf, he focused on sacred art for churches, including a marble Pietà for St. Gereon in Cologne in a style close to the Nazarene movement.

== Life and career ==
Born in Düsseldorf, Reiss was the third child of Carl Peter Josef Reiß, who worked then as a coachman, and Sophie Henriette Fink. His sisters were Luise and Christine. He received his training as a sculptor from Julius Bayerle (1826–1873), who later established the first studio for sculpture at the Kunstakademie Düsseldorf under the direction of Wilhelm von Schadow. Before that, Reiss had attended the elementary class of Joseph Wintergerst at the Kunstakademie in 1851. He also attended Karl Ferdinand Sohn's antiquities class from 1854 to 1855 and received lessons in anatomy and proportions from Heinrich Mücke. Josef Reiss was a member of the Malkasten artists group, and had his studio in the mid-1870s at Klosterstraße 88, where he took in his widowed mother. In the early 1880s, Reiss built a home for himself on the corner plot of Kurfürstenstraße 28 at Klosterstraße 128. The owner of the neighbouring house was, among others, Gustav Rutz's family.

He devoted his work entirely to the church, in a style similar to the Nazarene movement. For his marble Pietà for St. Gereon in Cologne, he looked at Italian models, including Michelangelo's Pietà in St. Peter's Basilica in Rome. He created a new Calvary next to Düsseldorf's St. Lambertus, replacing a late-Gothic group sculpture of seven figures which had fallen into disrepair.

== Work ==
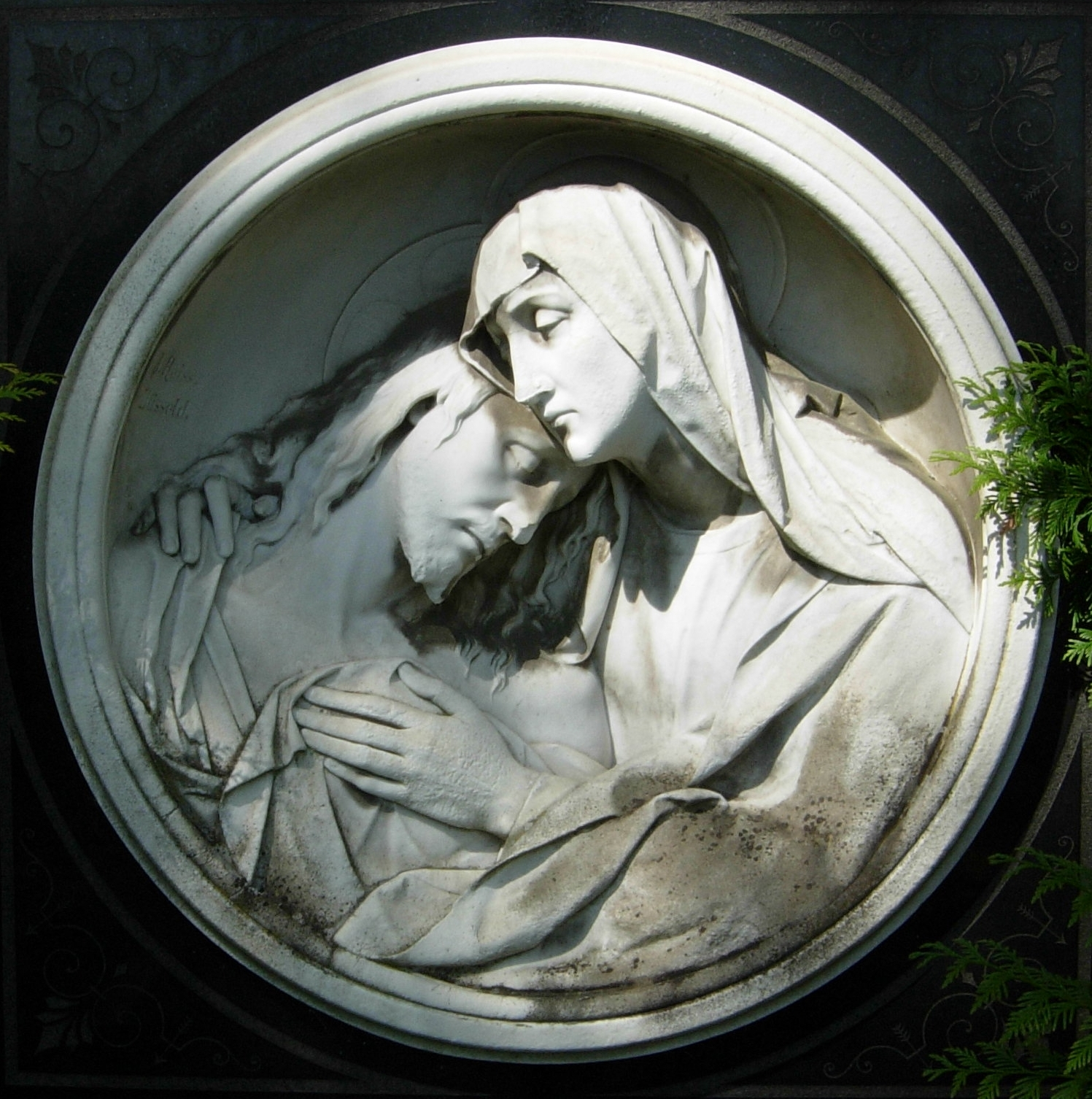
Marble Pietà medallion by Reiss on the Poppelsdorf cemetery in Bonn

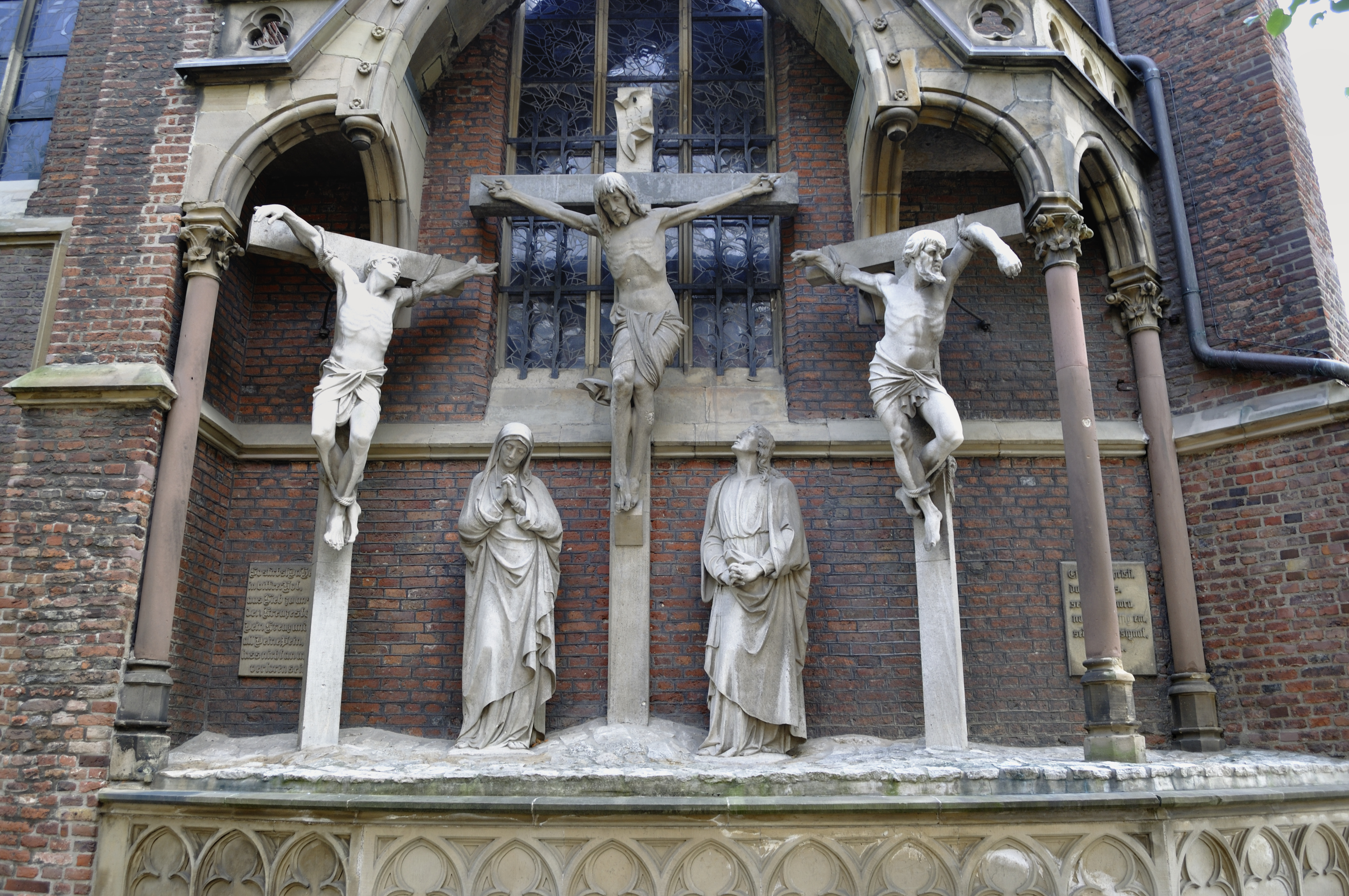
New Calvary at St. Lambertus in Düsseldorf

- Andernach
  - Madonna, wood carving, Maria Himmelfahrt.
- Cologne
  - Marble Pietà in St. Gereon (1897).
- Düsseldorf
  - Allegorical figures on the facade of the new town hall, Neues Rathaus.
  - Sculptures, the cross above the altar and the Madonna in St. Mariä Empfängnis.
  - Stations of the Cross in St. Mariä Empfängnis, with his student Alexander Iven.
  - Madonna on the Mariensäule on the Maxplatz.
  - New Calvary and figures of saints at the portal of St. Lambertus.
  - Grave site of Friedrich Wilhelm von Schadow at the Golzheim Cemetery.
- Duisburg
  - War memorial for soldiers of the Unification Wars with the seated Duisburgia on the square on Königstraße (unveiled in 1873, not preserved).
  - Monument to Gerardus Mercator on Burgplatz in front of the town hall.
- Grefrath
  - Altars and figures of saints in St. Stephanus.
- Hüls
  - High altar in St. Cyriakus.
- Neuss
  - Side altars in St. Quirinus
