= Julius Bayerle =

German painter & sculptor (1826–1873)

Julius Bayerle (2 June 1826 – 8 August 1873) was a German sculptor and painter as well as a teacher at the Kunstakademie Düsseldorf.

== Life ==
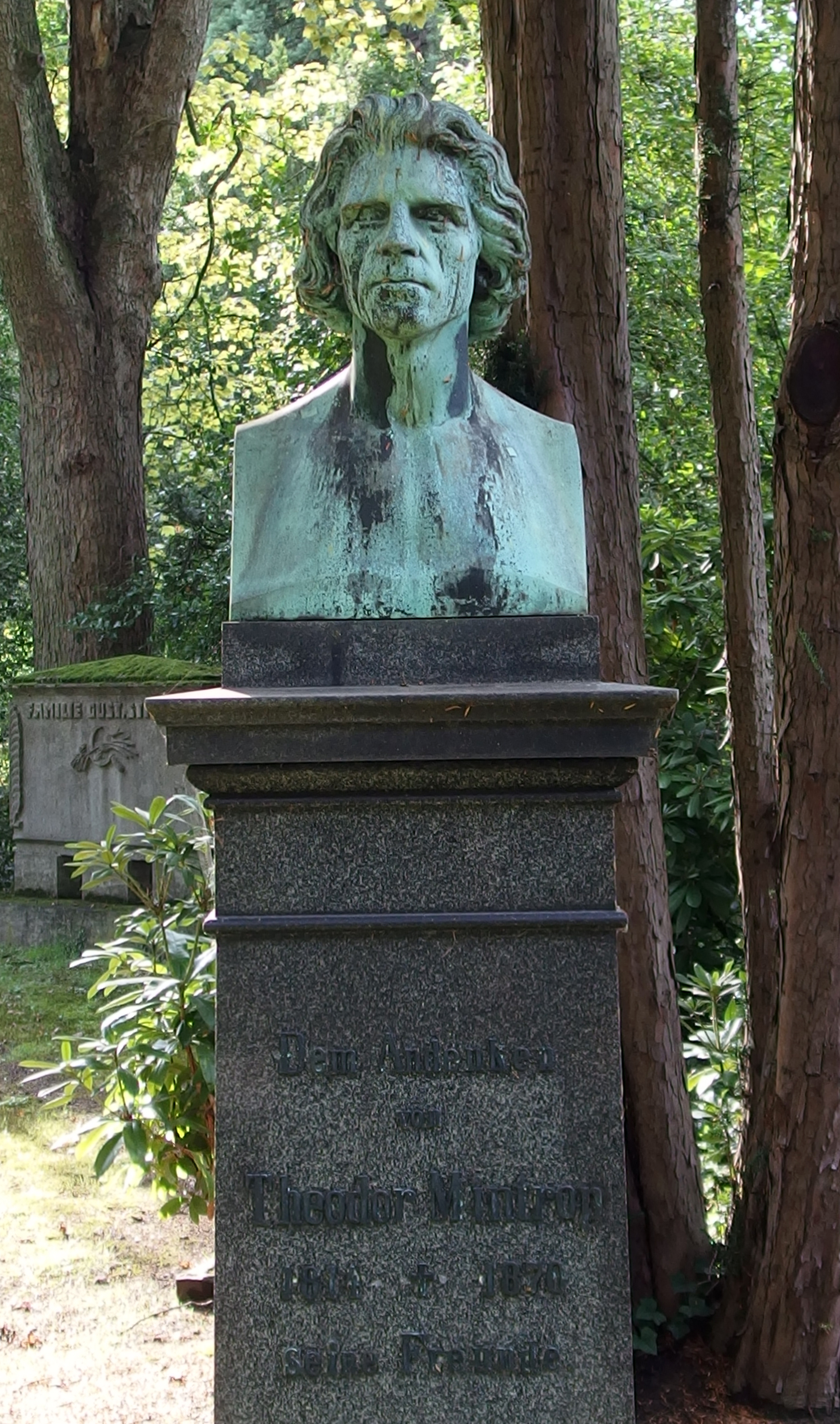
Theodor Mintrop bust, (2015)

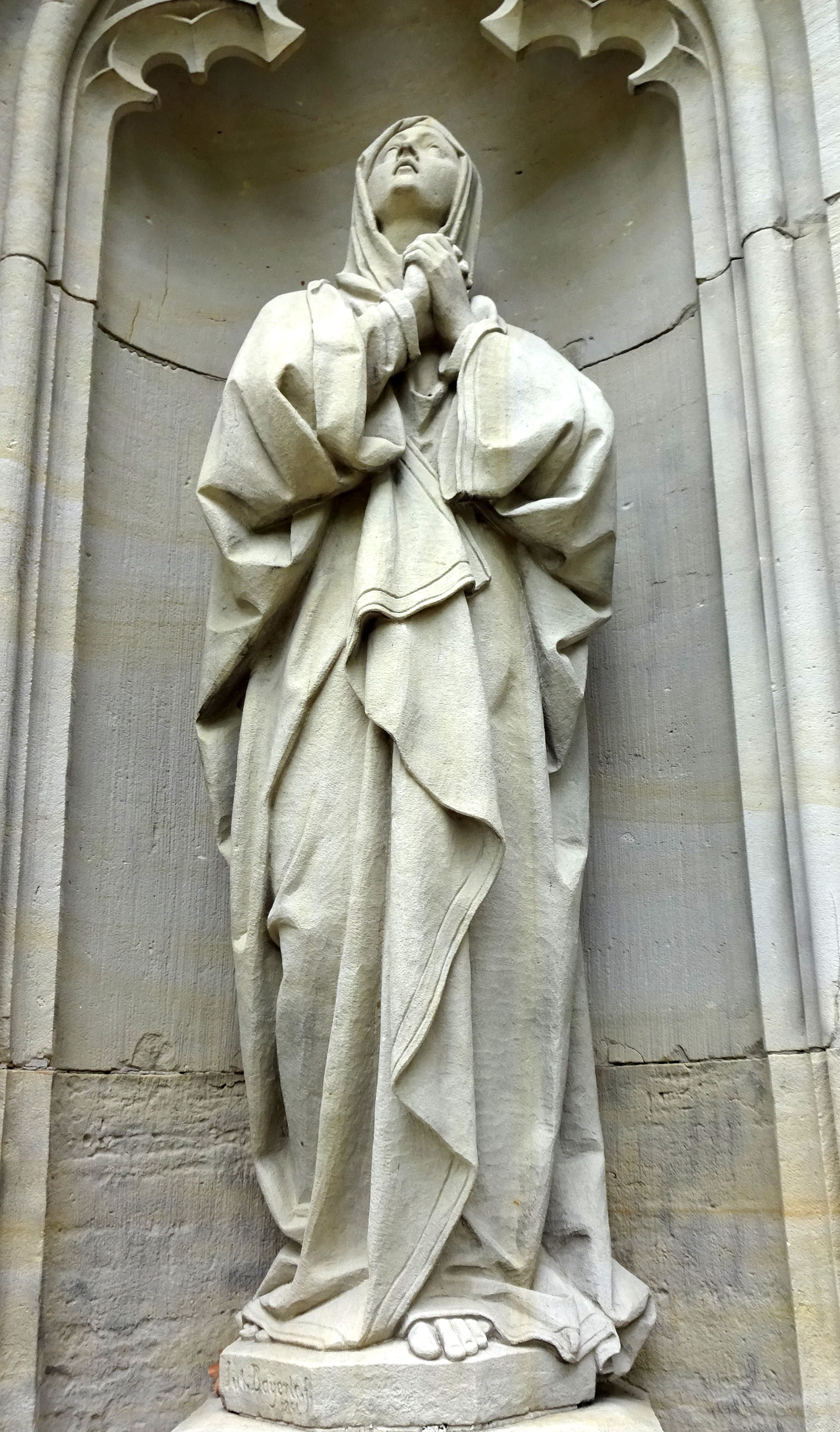
Madonna am Hochkreuz (2019)

Bayerle, son of the dressmaker Franz Bayerle (died 1852) and Catharine Abelshausen studied painting at the Kunstakademie Düsseldorf from 1850 to 1860. His teacher there was Friedrich Wilhelm von Schadow. At the Katholieke Universiteit Leuven he found another opportunity for training with Karel Hendrik Geerts. He undertook study trips, including one to Rome, where he stayed from November 1853 to January 1854. In 1854, he returned to Düsseldorf, where he was appointed the first professor of sculpture at the academy, which had been re-founded in 1819. At first he created a series of works with religious content, such as a crucifixion group for Wesel, Christ and the Apostles for Krefeld and a Madonna for Sigmaringen. Bayerle's later works have a more profane, partly also decorative character; among them are statues and monumental sculptures for buildings. Bayerle, Knight of the Order of the Crown (Prussia), died in Düsseldorf at the age of 47.

Anton Josef Reiss was one of his students, as was Leo Müsch.

== Work ==
- 1851: Madonna at the high cross in the Golzheim cemetery, since 1905 on the "Millionenhügel" of the Nordfriedhofs
- 1853: Apostle figures of St. Peter and St. Paul on the west façade of the Neuss Quirinusmünster
- 1858:seven still pictures for the Historisches Rathaus Wesel
- 1858: Suidbert monument, sandstone, 3.40 metres high, on the Alte Hardt in Elberfeld (not preserved).
- 1860: Sandsteindenkmal des Reitergenerals Friedrich Wilhelm von Seydlitz in Kalkar. (not preserved)
- 1860: Denkmal für die Prinzessin Stephanie von Hohenzollern in Düsseldorf
- 1864: Sculpture of St. Suitbert, in a niche on the façade of the listed building on the Suitbertus-Stiftsplatz Nr. 10, Kaiserswerth.
- 1861: Statue of the Elector Johann Sigismund in Kleve
- 1870: Bust of the painter Theodor Mintrop, 1876 erected on his grave in the Golzheim cemetery (relocated to the Nordfriedhof Düsseldorf)
- 1873: Krieger-/Kaiser-Wilhelm-I.-Denkmal vor dem Rathaus von Mülheim an der Ruhr
