= Ernst Seifert =

German organ builder (1855–1928)

Ernst Seifert (9 May 1855 – 27 April 1928) was a German organ builder and founder of a company named after him.

In 1885 he founded his company in Cologne-Mannsfeld.

Organs by Seifert are found in the following churches:

- 1898 St. Gereon's Basilica, Cologne
- 1903 Christus-Church, Mönchengladbach,
- 1907 Kevelaer Basilica
- 1907 Quirinus Münster, Neuss
- 1909 St. Peter's Church, Kettwig
- 1912 Alternberg Cathedral, Altenberg
- 1912 St. Matthias Church, Cologne-Bayenthal
