= Joseph Wintergerst =

German painter

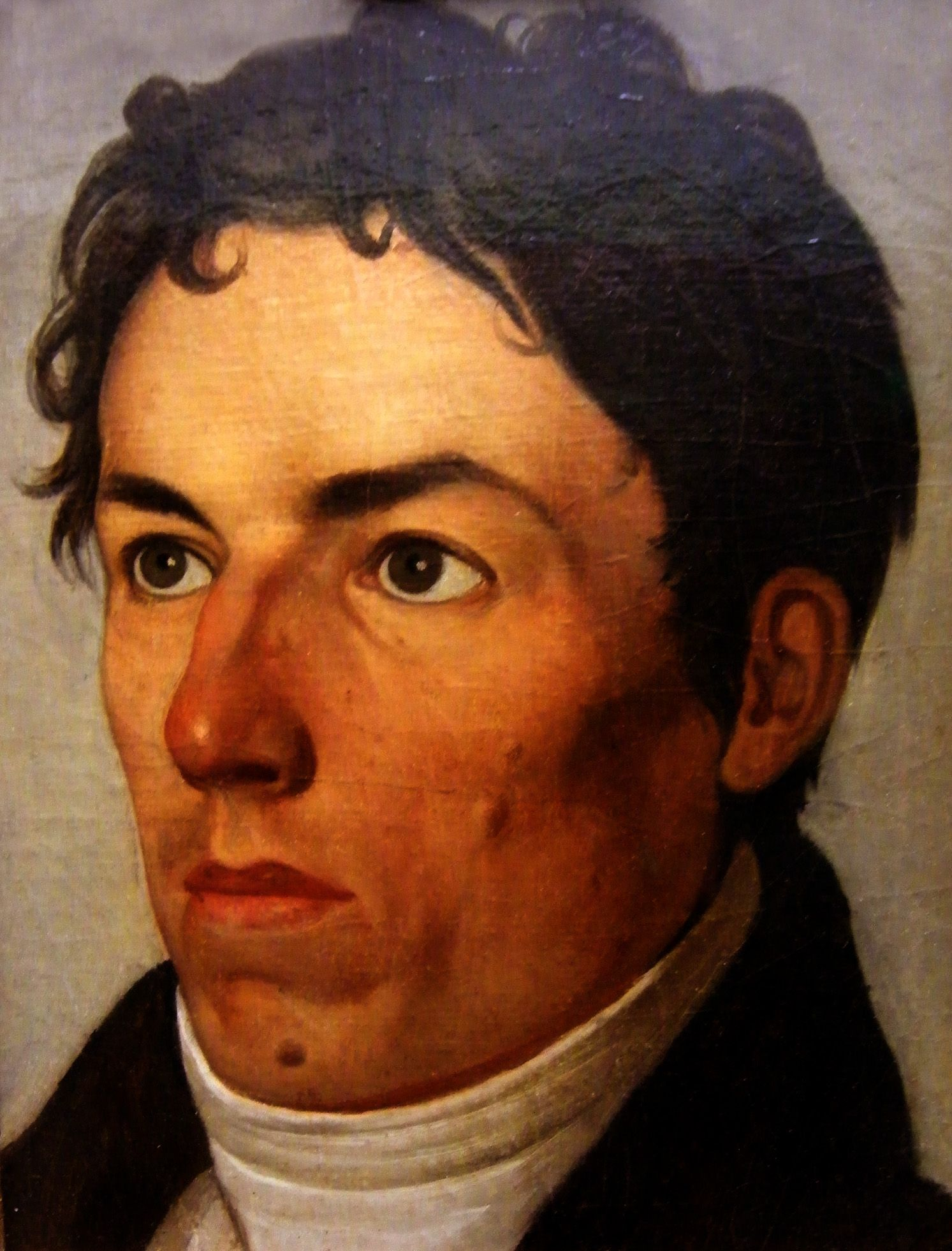
Joseph Wintergerst; portrait by Friedrich Overbeck (c. 1813)

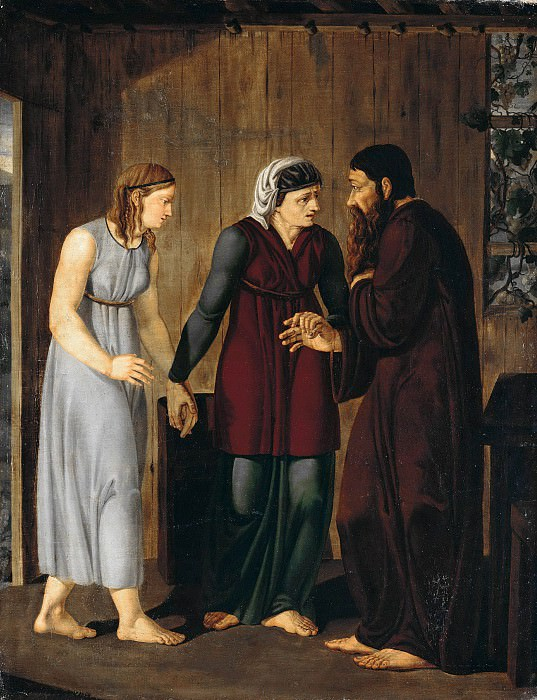
Hagar Being Presented to Abraham

Joseph Wintergerst (3 October 1783, Wallerstein - 25 January 1867, Düsseldorf) was a German painter in the Romantic style; associated with the Nazarene movement.

== Life and work ==
He was born to the painter, Anton Wintergerst (1737–1805), and his second wife, Maria Barbara née Bux, daughter of the faience maker, Johann Baptist Bux (1716-1800). After 1804, he attended the Academy of Fine Arts Munich, then the Academy of Fine Arts Vienna. There, in 1809, he became one of the co-founders of the "Lukasbund" artists' guild. In 1811, he went to Rome with his friends, Friedrich Overbeck and Franz Pforr, and joined the artists' colony at Sant’Isidoro a Capo le Case.

Pforr's untimely death in 1812 left him unsettled so, in 1813, he went to Switzerland, accompanied by Christian Xeller, and taught at the Cantonal school in Aarau. After 1815, he was a drawing teacher at the gymnasium in Ellwangen. In 1822 his friend, Peter von Cornelius, hired him as a drawing teacher at the Kunstakademie Düsseldorf, where Cornelius was Acting Director. Two years later, Wintergerst succeeded Peter's brother, Lambert Cornelius as "Inspector" and began giving drawing lessons at the Royal Gymnasium. He resigned these positions in the early 1850s and retired.

His sister, Maria Barbara Wintergerst was one of his students. She also became a well known painter and drawing teacher.
