= Grefrath, Neuss =

Coordinates: 51.1721°N 6.6329°E

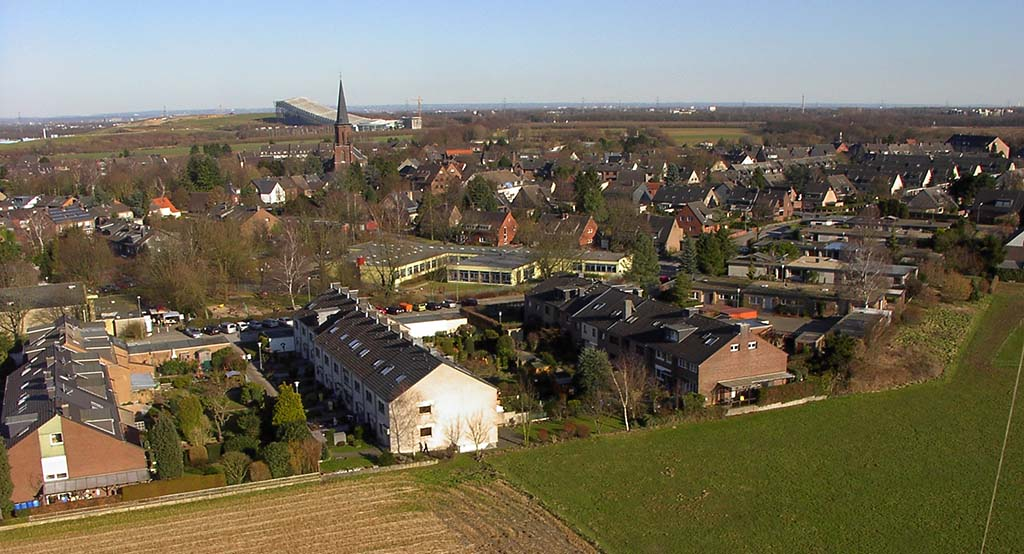
Aerial view of Grefrath

Grefrath is a district of Neuss, North Rhine-Westphalia, Germany.

== Population ==
Historical population
Year	Pop.	±%
1816	767	—
1832	796	+3.8%
1852	891	+11.9%
1895	938	+5.3%
1910	1,427	+52.1%
1925	1,334	−6.5%
1950	1,189	−10.9%
1961	1,084	−8.8%
2002	3,589	+231.1%
2006	3,814	+6.3%
2011	3,685	−3.4%

== Notable people ==
- Mathias Weber (1778–1803), robber
