= Quirinus-Münster, Neuss =

Basilica of St. Quirinus
- Münster-Basilika St. Quirin
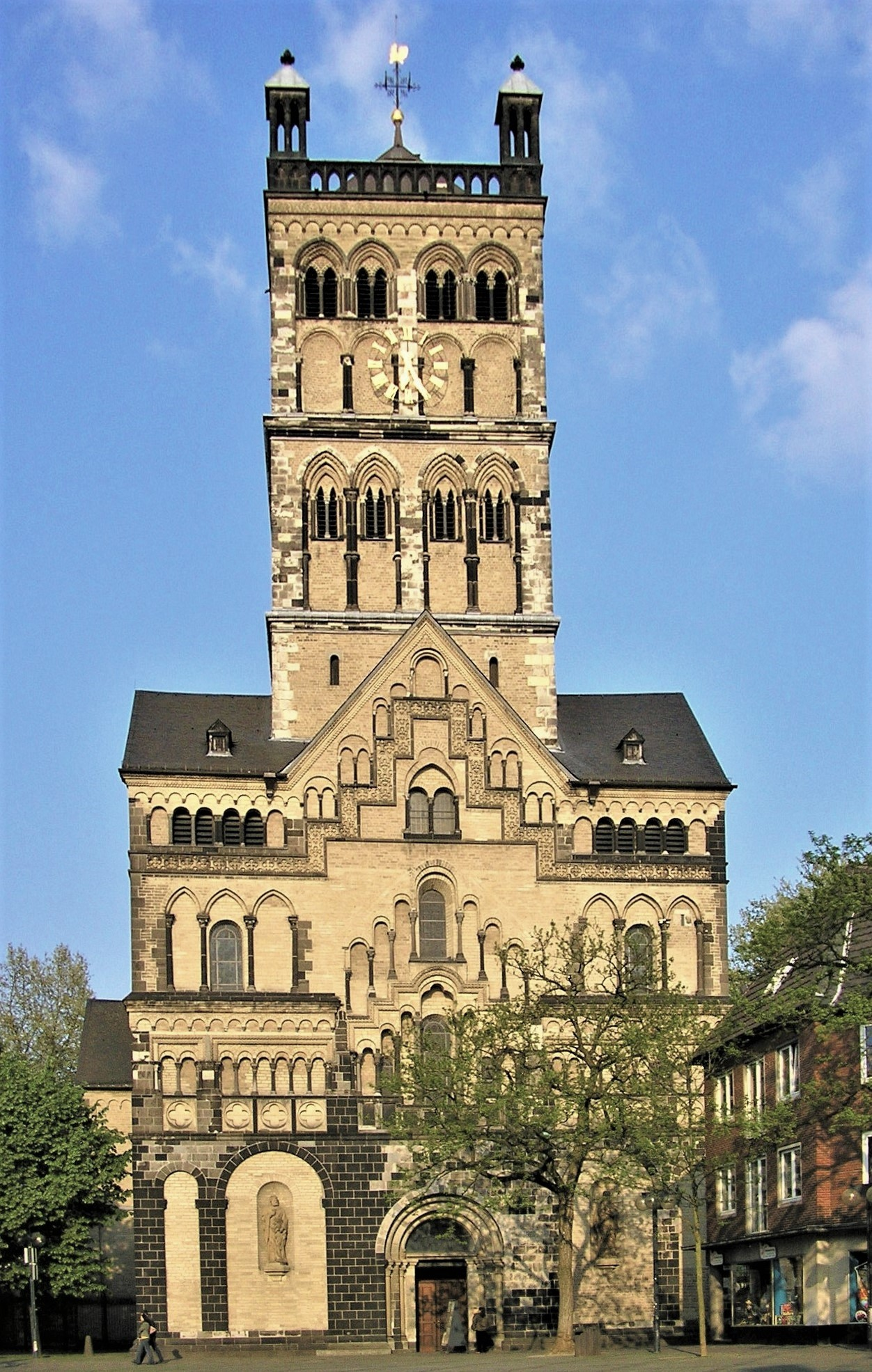

- Location within North Rhine-Westphalia Location within Germany
- 51°11′57″N 6°41′36″E
- Location: Neuss, North Rhine-Westphalia
- Country: Germany
- Denomination: Roman Catholic Church

The Quirinus-Münster also called Münster-Basilika of St. Quirinus of Neuss is a Catholic basilica that was erected in the city of Neuss in the western part of the present state of North Rhine-Westphalia in Germany between 1209 and 1230. The basilica is one of the best examples of Romanesque churches in Germany. It has a strong Lombard influence but in principle shows the first signs of Gothic. In its bell tower the first semicircular arches appear. This form of arch becomes centuries later in one of the marks that marked the Gothic style.

It is dedicated to St. Quirinus of Neuss, a prominent Roman martyr of the third century, revered in Neuss as the body of the martyr moved to this city in the year 1050, a gift of Pope Leo IX to Abbess Gepa.

In 2009 the church was recognized by Pope Benedict XVI with the title of minor basilica.

== Architecture ==
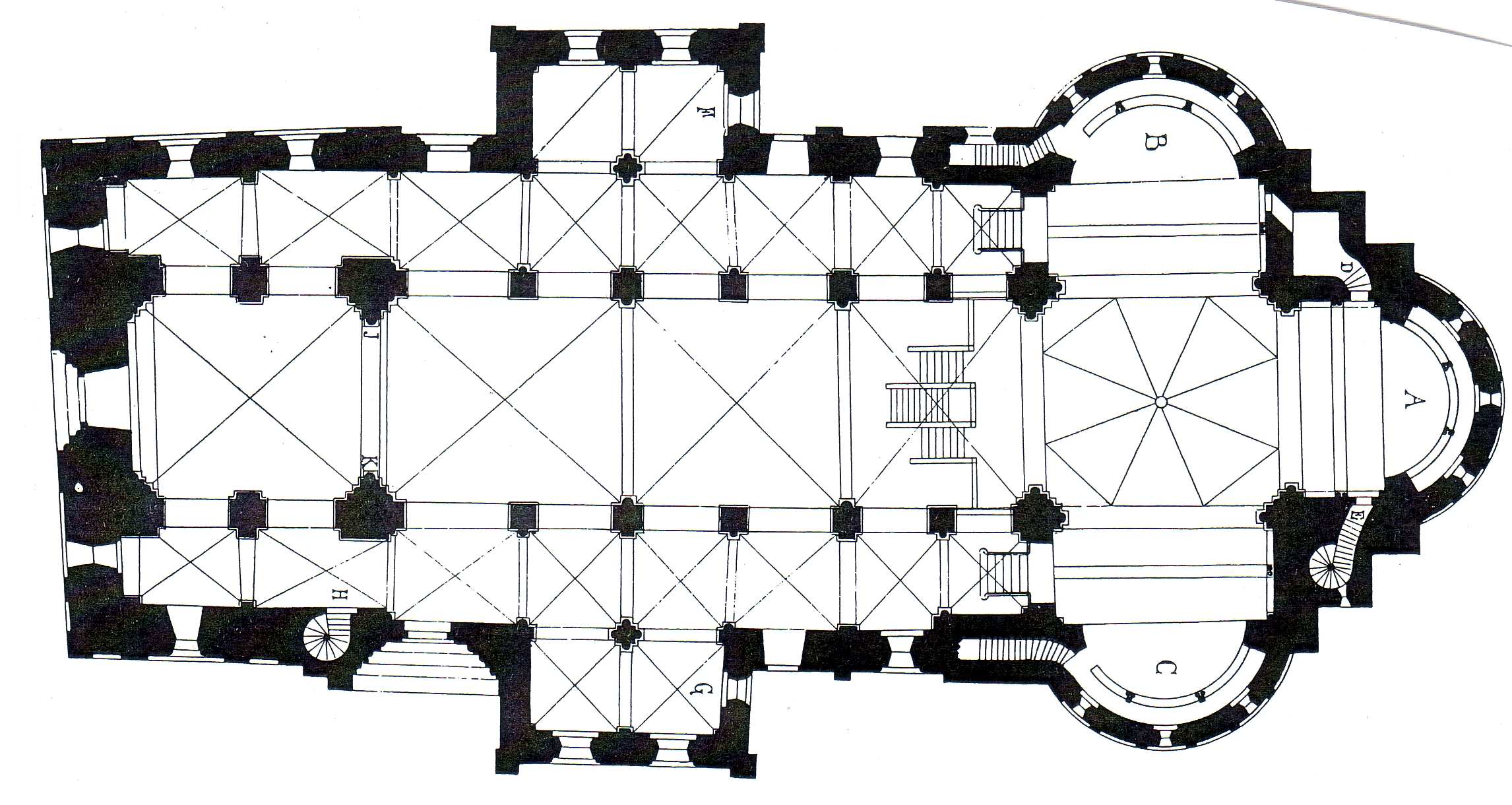
Layout of Quirinus-Münster

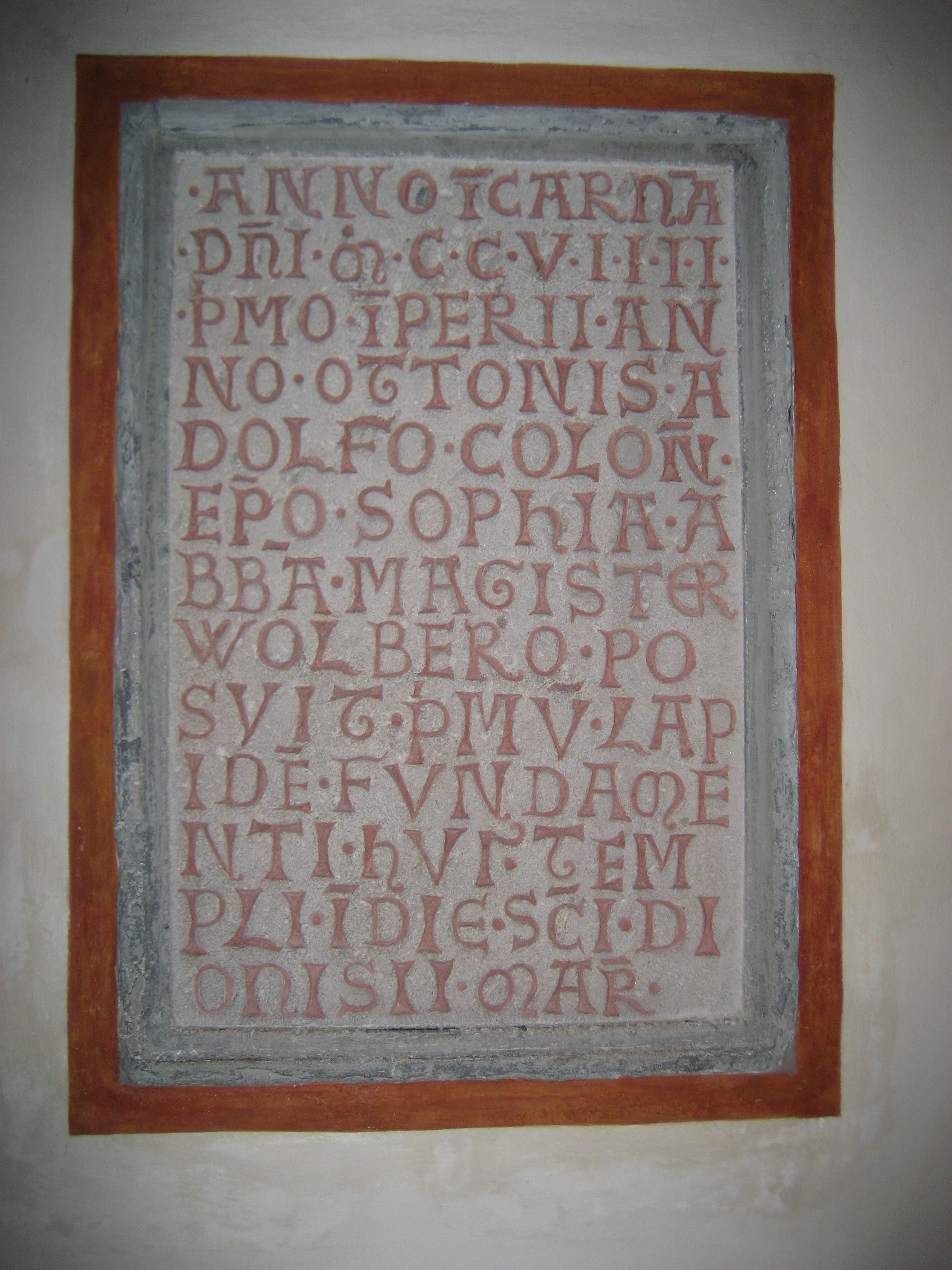
Inscription/cornerstone from 1209

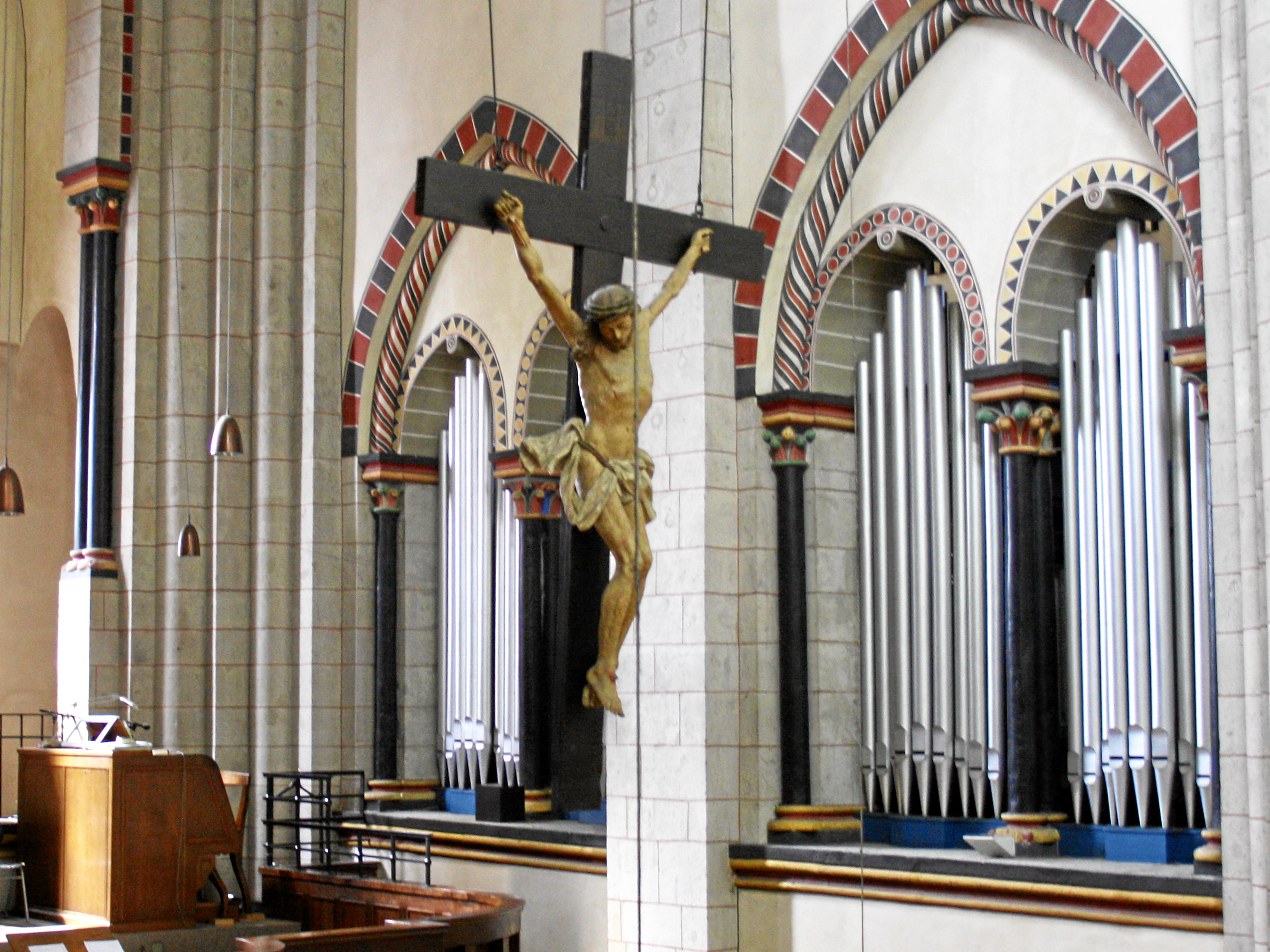
Seifert Organ and cross from 1592

Build as a sacral building in the time between Romanticism and Gothic building style the Quirinus-Münster is a great example churches built in Germany at that time. It is also one of the last big churches build to house pilgrims with the clover-leafed (German: Dreikonchenstil) common in the Rhine-area – the bench seats in 90 degree angle have a rounded curvature at the outer side. Building began at 9th of October 1209 as stated in cornerstone found in the south side of the clover-leafed bench seating.

== Décor ==
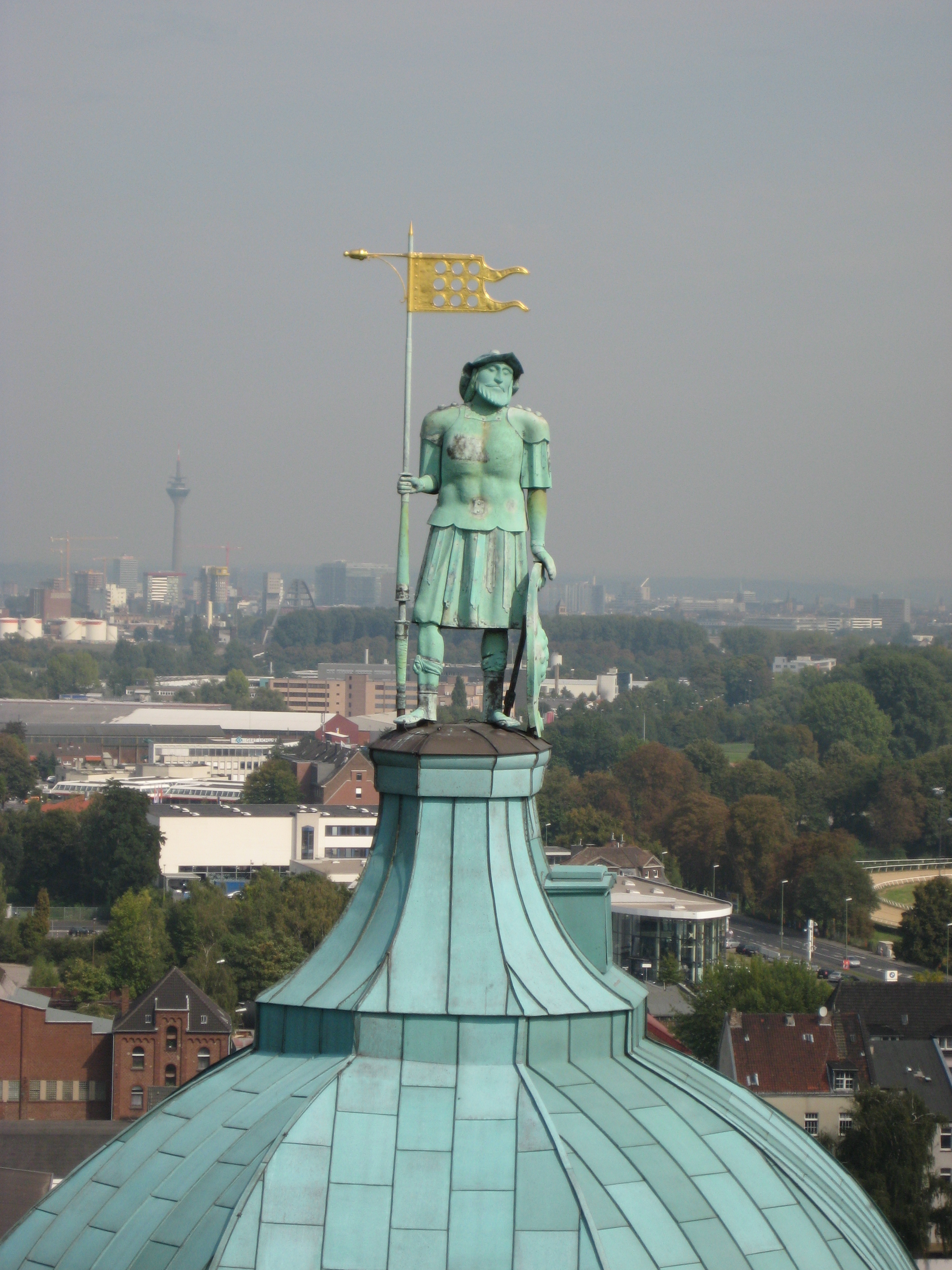
Statue of Quirinus on top of the dome

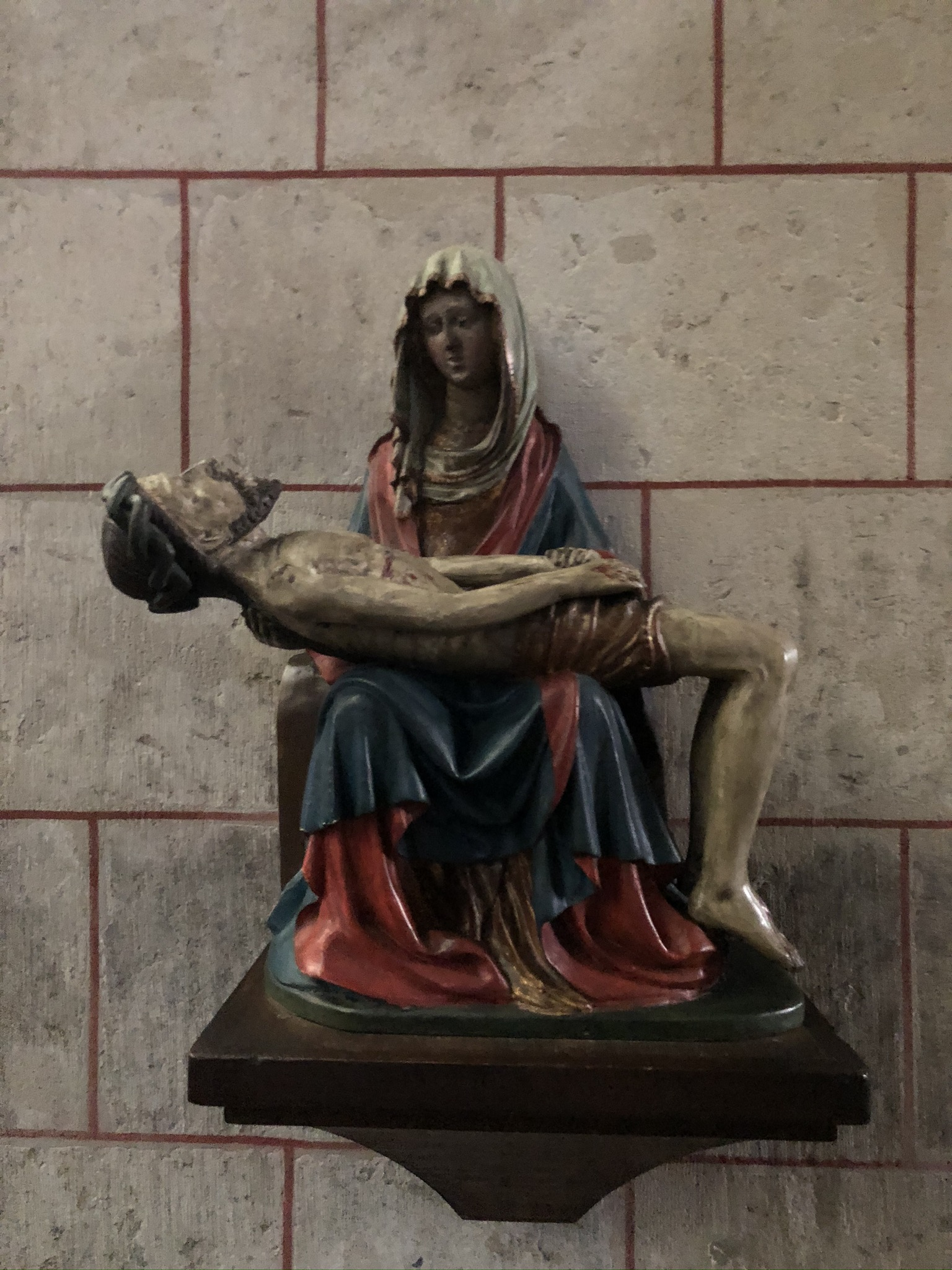
Pietà, approx. 1430

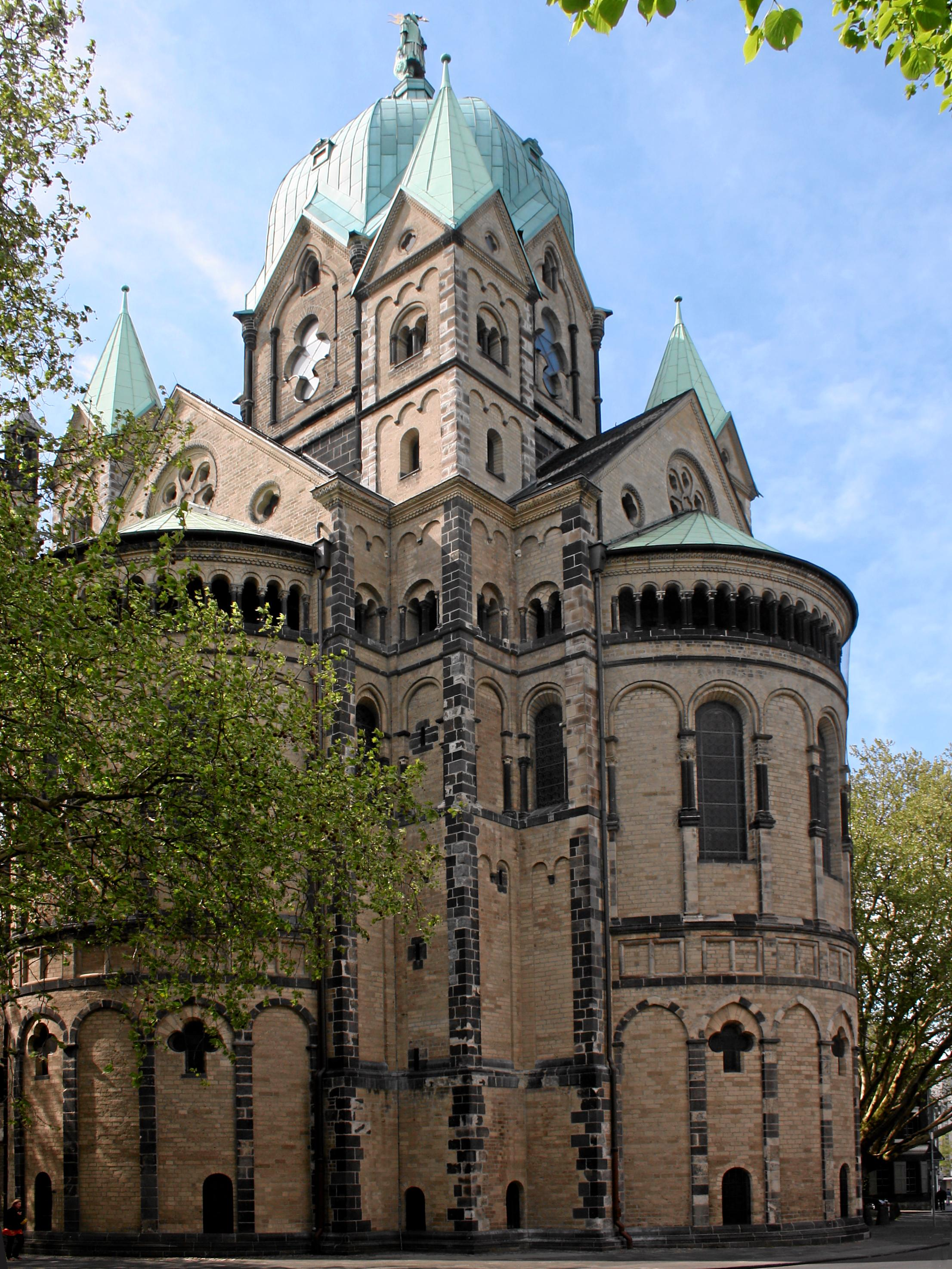
Clover leaf formed side

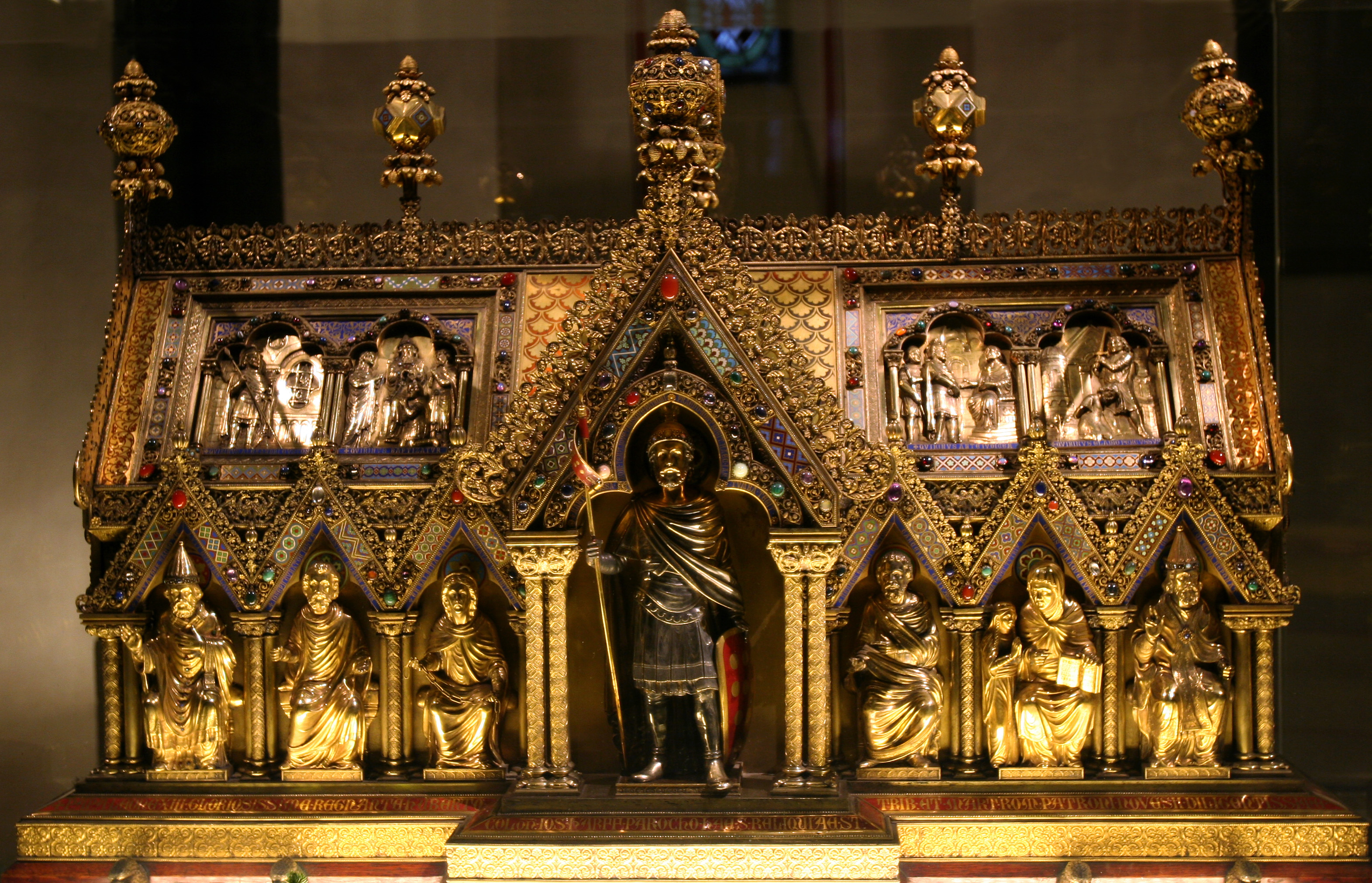
Reliquary holding Quirinus' relics

The dome of Quirinus featured magnificent internal features like a Ciborium above the main altar similar to Basilica of Saint Paul Outside the Walls and similar churches in Rome built in Gothic Revival architecture. Many precious objects where lost due to World War II.

== Organ ==
In 1907 Ernst Seifert (working in Cologne-Mannsfeld and Kevelaer) installed the big organ.

== See also ==
- Roman Catholicism in Germany
- Saint Quirinus of Neuss

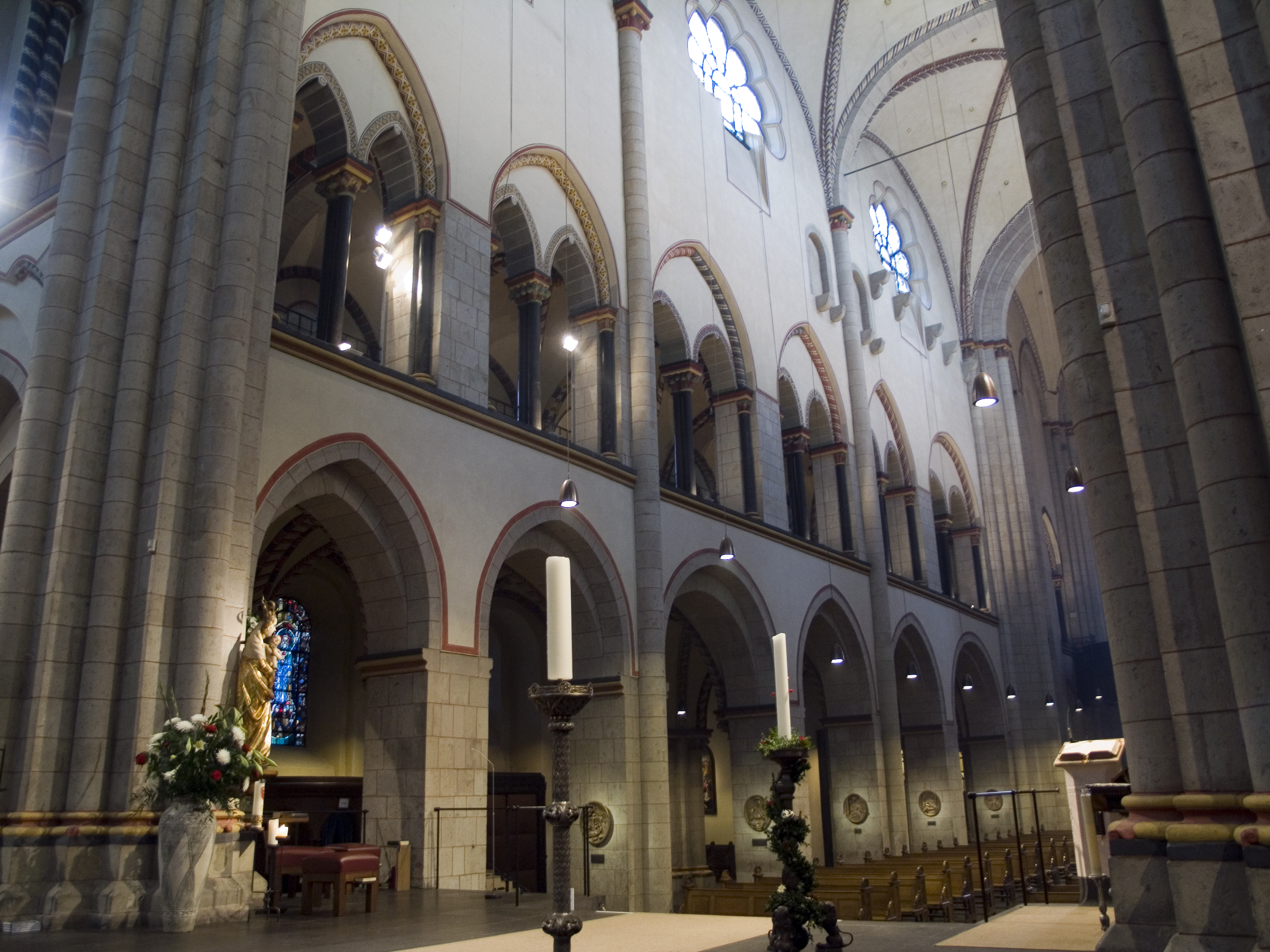
Internal view
