= Beurre blanc =

Emulsified butter sauce

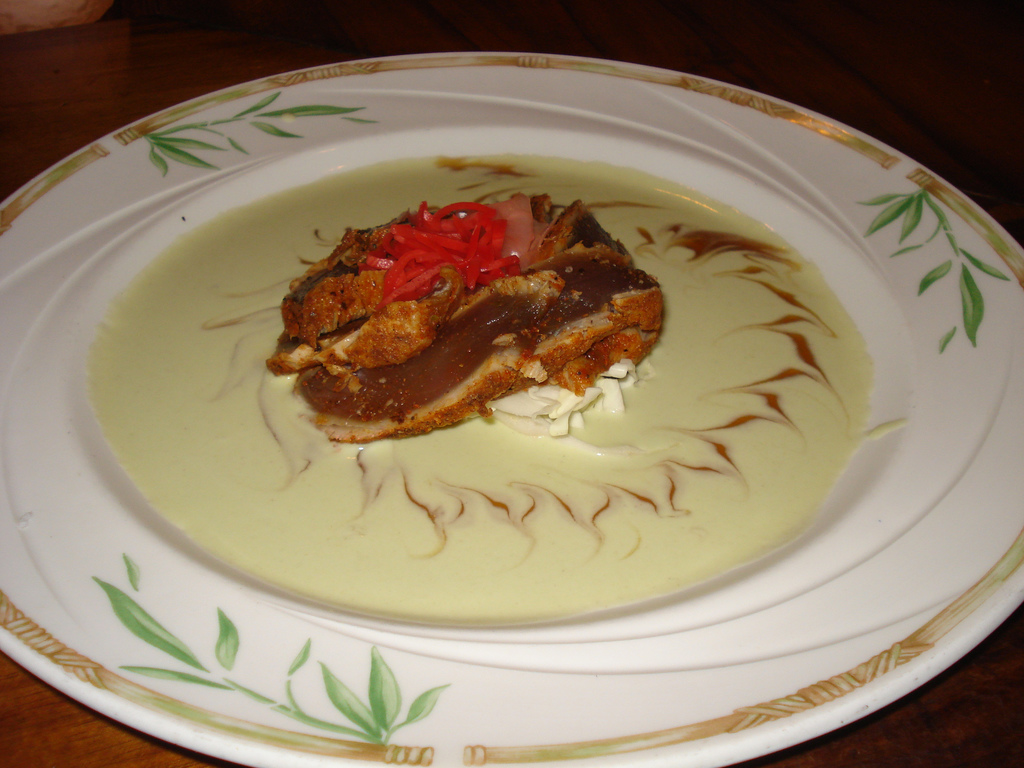
Seared yellowfin tuna in a beurre blanc sauce with chocolate and wasabi

Beurre blanc (French pronunciation: [bœʁ blɑ̃]; lit. 'white butter') or beurre Nantais (French pronunciation: [bœʁ nɑ̃tɛ]) is a warm emulsified butter sauce made with a reduction of vinegar, lemon juice and/or white wine and shallots into which cold whole butter is slowly added and whisked. It is the classic accompaniment to pike, for which the Loire is famous, but it is also served with several other fish dishes and also with vegetables.

== Origin ==
Beurre blanc as a sauce goes back to at least 1669: the anonymous author of Le nouveau cuisinier françois suggests pumpkin with a beurre blanc sauce, but there is no indication of what the sauce contained. Various different towns claim to have invented the modern version of the sauce. Citizens of Nantes maintain that it was created through an oversight in the kitchens of the Château de Goulaine at the turn of the twentieth century. Supposedly, the head cook, Clémence Lefeuvre, preparing a banquet, told one of her junior chefs to prepare a sauce béarnaise. Just as she was about to serve it, she noticed that it did not look right. The egg yolk necessary in a bearnaise had been omitted. There being no time to make a fresh sauce, she served it as it was and she received congratulations on her "nouvelle sauce".

By other accounts Lefeuvre invented the sauce at the restaurant she later ran in Saint-Julien-de-Concelles, near Nantes. According to her grandson, reported in 2014, it was following a comment from a customer that she modified the recipe for her melted butter sauce. She overheard one diner saying to his companions, "It's good, but it tastes a bit like mussel sauce ..." Lefeuvre, stung, reduced a generous pinch of chopped shallots with a little vinegar and white pepper, which she added to her sauce. The food writer Curnonsky called Lefeuvre "the high priestess of the beurre blanc.

== Preparation ==
Beurre blanc is a hot butter sauce. It is traditionally served with pike (brochet au beurre blanc) and is also served with other fish, vegetables and eggs. The authors of Mastering the Art of French Cooking (1961) comment, "Warm, thick, creamy, and butter-coloured, beurre blanc is actually nothing but warm butter flavoured with shallots, wine, vinegar, salt, and pepper".

White wine and vinegar or lemon juice are boiled down with very finely chopped shallots until the acids are well concentrated. Butter is gradually beaten in with a whisk, and, because of the acids, the milk solids in the butter remain suspended rather than sinking to the bottom of pan as they would otherwise do when heated. This keeps the sauce from turning oily and it retains a creamy appearance. The small amount of emulsifiers naturally found in butter, including a trace of lecithin, form an oil-in-water emulsion.

According to Curnonsky, "It is a sauce of exquisite finesse and lightness, discreetly seasoned with Angevin shallots; it wonderfully accompanies the pike and the shad of the Loire, and even some salt-water fish such as bass and whiting". He counselled, "the shallot must be, so to speak, volatilised in the vinegar, and … should be no more than a remote presence".

Variations on the basic beurre blanc include the addition of freshly-shredded sorrel or spinach, blanched fine julienne of lemon or lime, or chopped fresh herbs. Beurre rouge (English: "red butter") is a variant of the beurre blanc sauce prepared by substituting a dry red wine for the white wine and vinegar. Madame Prunier, who ran two celebrated fish restaurants, the first in Paris and the second in London, recommended beurre rouge to accompany barbel, carp, eel and tench.

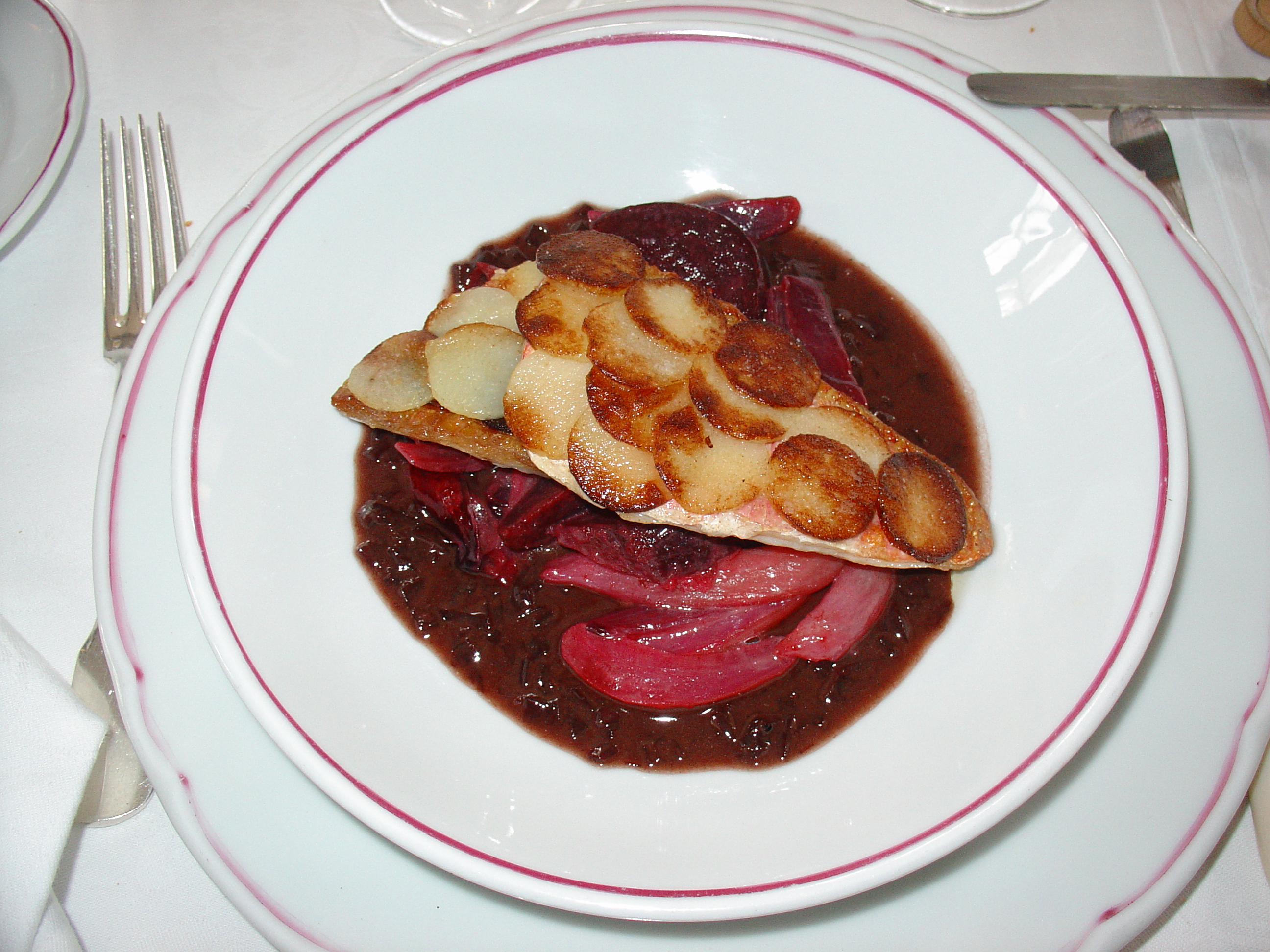
A dish of fish with potato ‘scales’ served with a beurre rouge (red butter)

== See also ==
- Beurre monté
- Beurre noir
- Beurre noisette
- Cooking with wine

== Sources ==
- Anon (1669). Le nouveau cuisinier françois. Paris: Charles Villery. OCLC 493115131.
- Beck, Simone; Louisette Bertholle; Julia Child (1961). Mastering the Art of French Cooking. London: Penguin. OCLC 222387312.
- Biegi, Amandine (1997). Cookery Around the World: France – the West. Amsterdam: Time Life Books. ISBN 0-70-543590-3.
- Ceserani, Victor; John Campbell; David Foskett (2008). Practical Cookery. Oxford: Hodder. ISBN 978-0340-94837-8.
- David, Elizabeth (1964). French Provincial Cooking. London: Penguin. OCLC 27037523.
- Marchand, Pierre (1992). Loire-Atlantique: Bretagne. Paris: Editions Nouveaux Loisirs. ISBN 2-74-240008-7.
- Prunier, Simone (2011) [1938]. Madame Prunier's Fish Cookery Book. London: Quadrille. ISBN 978-1-84-400958-9.
