= Barbechat =

- Part of Divatte-sur-Loire
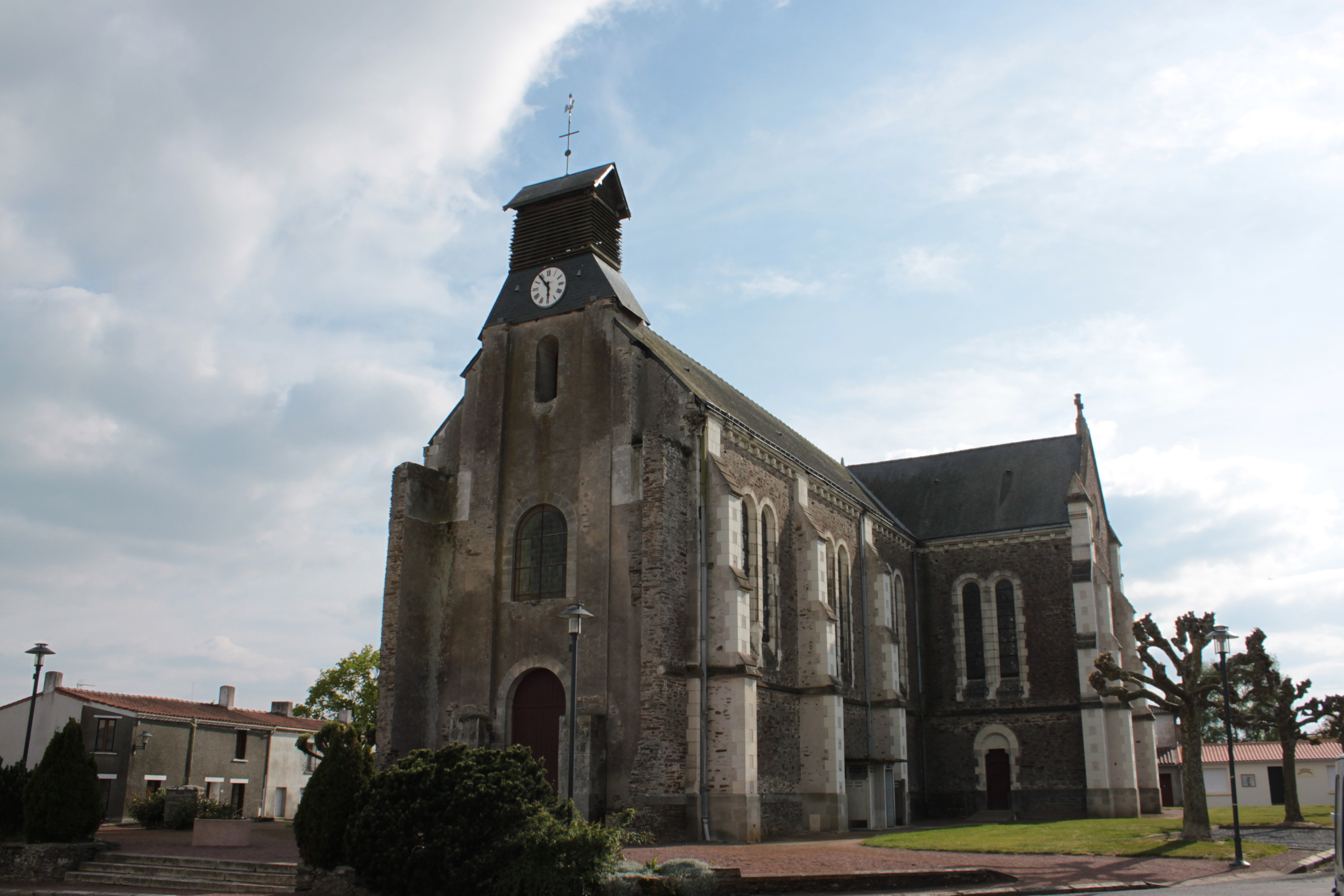
- The church of Sainte-Marie-Madeleine, in Barbechat

- Coat of arms
- Location of Barbechat
- Location within France Location within Pays de la Loire
- Coordinates: 47°17′00″N 1°17′00″W
- Country: France
- Region: Pays de la Loire
- Department: Loire-Atlantique
- Arrondissement: Nantes
- Canton: Vallet
- Commune: Divatte-sur-Loire
- Area^{1}: 11.76 km^{2} (4.54 sq mi)
- Highest elevation: 84 m (276 ft)
- Lowest elevation: 7 m (23 ft)
- Population (2022): 1,351
  - Density: 114.9/km^{2} (297.5/sq mi)
- Time zone: UTC+01:00 (CET)
  - Summer (DST): UTC+02:00 (CEST)
- Postal code: 44450
- ^{1} French Land Register data, which excludes lakes, ponds, glaciers > 1 km^{2} (0.386 sq mi or 247 acres) and river estuaries.

Barbechat (French pronunciation: [baʁbəʃa]; Breton: Bargazh) is a former commune in the Loire-Atlantique department in western France. It was created in 1868 from part of La Chapelle-Basse-Mer. On 1 January 2016, it was merged into the new commune of Divatte-sur-Loire.

== Population ==
Historical population

Year	Pop.	±% p.a.
1872	1,119	—
1876	1,169	+1.10%
1881	1,111	−1.01%
1886	1,059	−0.95%
1891	998	−1.18%
1896	950	−0.98%
1901	904	−0.99%
1906	854	−1.13%
1911	843	−0.26%
1921	711	−1.69%
1926	663	−1.39%
1931	608	−1.72%

Year	Pop.	±% p.a.
1936	581	−0.90%
1946	552	−0.51%
1954	592	+0.88%
1962	584	−0.17%
1968	608	+0.67%
1975	566	−1.02%
1982	808	+5.22%
1990	905	+1.43%
1999	1,062	+1.79%
2013	1,339	+1.67%
2022	1,351	+0.10%

Source: EHESS and INSEE

== See also ==
- Communes of the Loire-Atlantique department
