= Landreau =

Landreau is a French surname. Notable people with the surname include:

- Fabrice Landreau (born 1968), French rugby union player
- Mickaël Landreau (born 1979), French footballer and manager

== See also ==
- Landrieu, related surname
- Le Landreau, French commune
