= La Chapelle-Heulin =

La Chapelle-Heulin La Chapèll-Oelein (Gallo) Chapel-Huelin (Breton)
- Commune
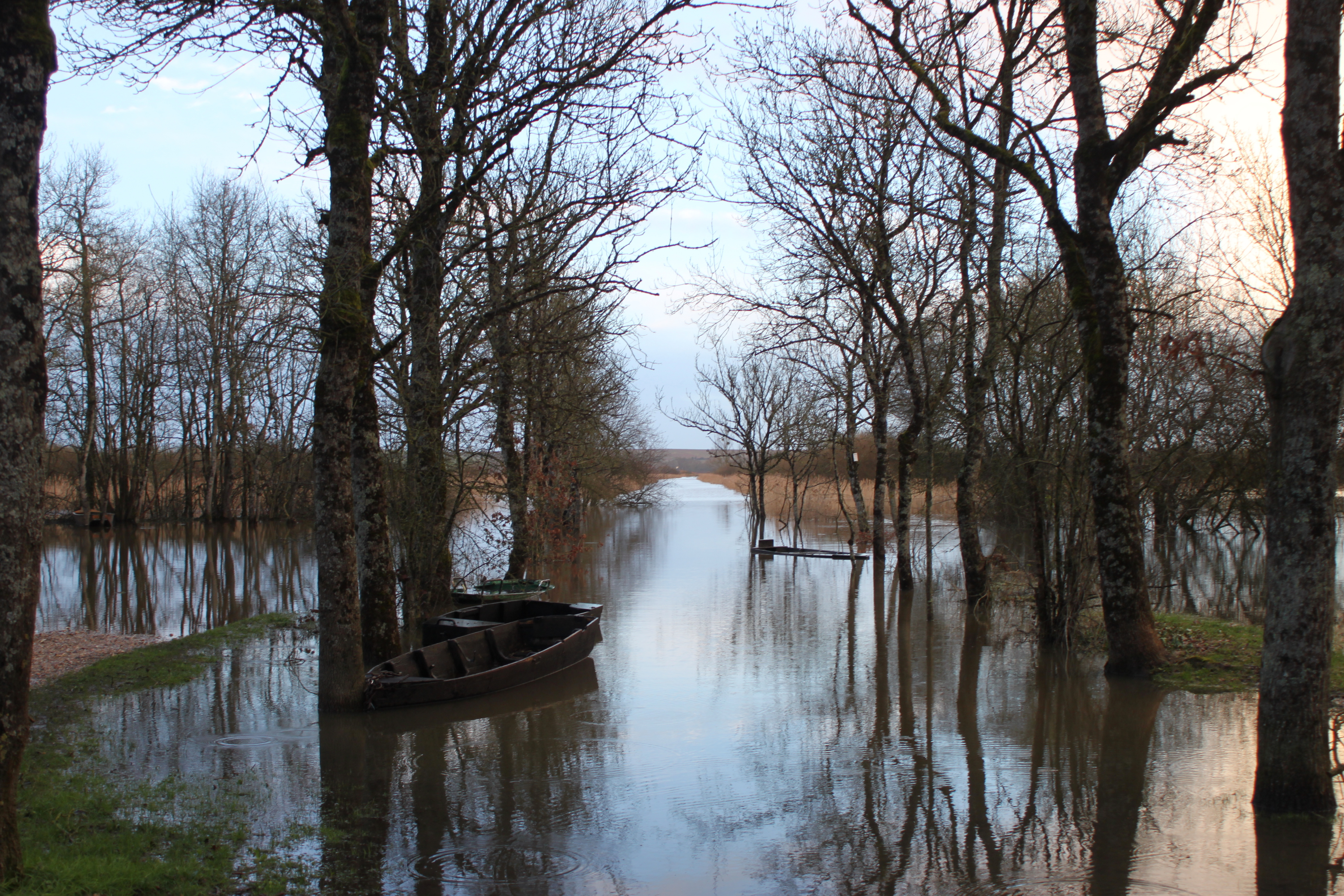
- Flooded Port of the Montru in February 2014

- Coat of arms
- Location of La Chapelle-Heulin
- Location within France Location within Pays de la Loire
- Coordinates: 47°10′38″N 1°20′21″W
- Country: France
- Region: Pays de la Loire
- Department: Loire-Atlantique
- Arrondissement: Nantes
- Canton: Vallet
- Intercommunality: Sèvre et Loire

Government
  - Mayor (2020–2026): Alain Arraitz
- Area^{1}: 13.47 km^{2} (5.20 sq mi)
- Highest elevation: 37 m (121 ft)
- Lowest elevation: 2 m (6.6 ft)
- Population (2023): 3,467
  - Density: 257.4/km^{2} (666.6/sq mi)
- Time zone: UTC+01:00 (CET)
  - Summer (DST): UTC+02:00 (CEST)
- INSEE/Postal code: 44032 /44330
- ^{1} French Land Register data, which excludes lakes, ponds, glaciers > 1 km^{2} (0.386 sq mi or 247 acres) and river estuaries.

La Chapelle-Heulin (French pronunciation: [la ʃapɛl ølɛ̃]; Gallo: La Chapèll-Oelein, Breton: Chapel-Huelin) is a commune in the Loire-Atlantique department in western France.

== Geography ==
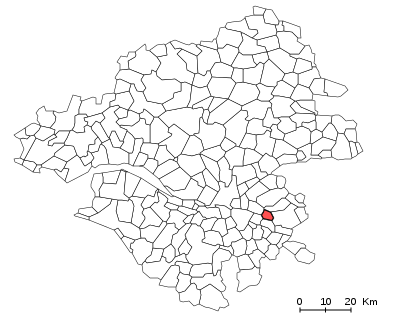
Location of La Chapelle-Heulin commune in the Loire-Atlantique Department

La Chapelle-Heulin is situated in 14 miles east of Nantes, 20 miles south of Ancenis and 27 miles west of Cholet. The neighbouring communes of La Chapelle-Heulin are Le Loroux-Bottereau, Le Landreau, Vallet, Le Pallet, La Haie-Fouassière and Haute-Goulaine.

== Population ==
Historical population

Year	Pop.	±% p.a.
1793	1,543	—
1821	1,342	−0.50%
1846	1,614	+0.74%
1872	1,546	−0.17%
1901	1,259	−0.71%
1926	1,069	−0.65%
1946	1,078	+0.04%
1962	1,216	+0.76%
1968	1,212	−0.05%

Year	Pop.	±% p.a.
1975	1,307	+1.08%
1982	1,800	+4.68%
1990	1,838	+0.26%
1999	1,852	+0.08%
2007	2,839	+5.48%
2012	3,209	+2.48%
2017	3,263	+0.33%
2023	3,467	+1.02%

Source: EHESS and INSEE (1968-2023)

== Personalities ==
- Aristide Briand, politician

== See also ==
- Communes of the Loire-Atlantique department
