= Château de Goulaine =

Castle near Nantes, France

Coordinates: 47°12′15″N 1°24′10″W

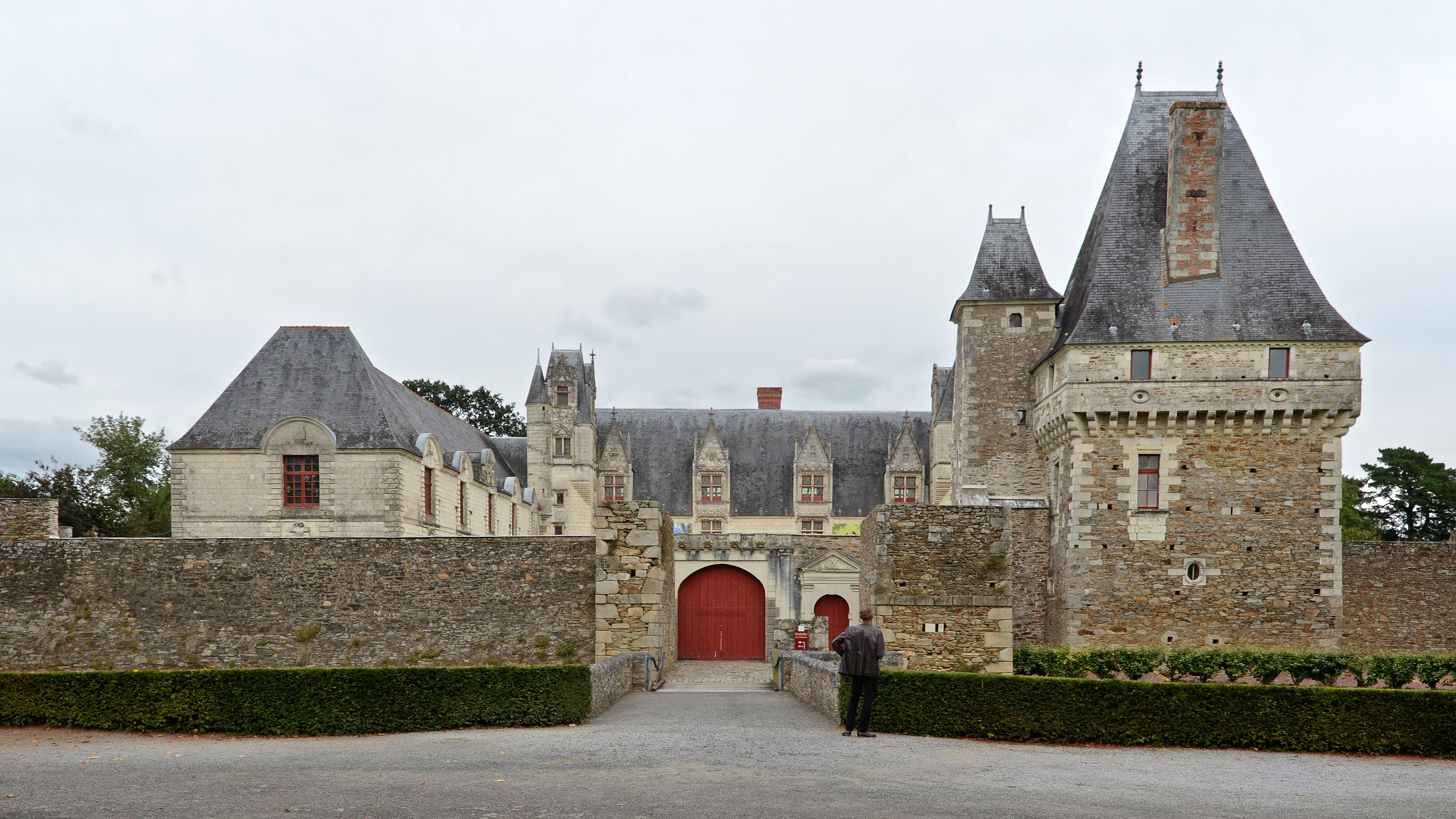
Château de Goulaine

The Château de Goulaine is a historic château located in the Loire Valley wine region near Nantes, France. The property has been home to the family of the marquis de Goulaine for over a thousand years. The Goulaine name is also used for estate-bottled wine that is produced at the property.

== History ==
Arms of Goulaine, impaling England and France

In the 12th century, when the Duchy of Brittany was independent, the first Goulaine, Jean de Goulaine, then captain of the city of Nantes, fortified the estate, which is still surrounded by marshes, to defend against attacks from Normans. The Goulaine family was of the old nobility, recorded in the Seventh Crusade (1248).

During the Wars of Religion, the Goulaines fought for the Catholic League – Gabriel, sieur de Goulaine, at the head of fifty lancers, and his brother Jean, baron du Faouët, took the châteaux of Trogoff (Plouescat) and of Kérouzéré (Sibiril) in 1590. Gabriel was attached to the Bourbon cause in being made a marquis by Henry IV of France.

The Goulaine family's ownership of the estate continued uninterrupted until 1788, when it was sold to a Dutch banker. This circumstance helped save the château from destruction during the French Revolution. In 1858, the Goulaine family reacquired the estate and maintains it today.

== Wines ==
While it is not clear exactly when the estate vineyard started producing wine for commercial use, rather than just family consumption, the millennium during which the estate of Château de Goulaine has been producing wine makes it the second-oldest known wine business still in existence, after the Staffelter Hof winery in Rhineland-Palatinate, Germany. The Goulaine winery is believed to be one of the oldest commercial enterprises in the world, and it is considered the oldest European family owned business. The castle estate is one of the last châteaux of the Loire Valley to still be producing wine.

In addition to producing a Muscadet, the Goulaine winery produces a Sancerre and a Vouvray, as well as what is believed to be the first commercial Chardonnay in the western Loire Valley. The estate also grows some Folle blanche.

== Architecture of the château ==
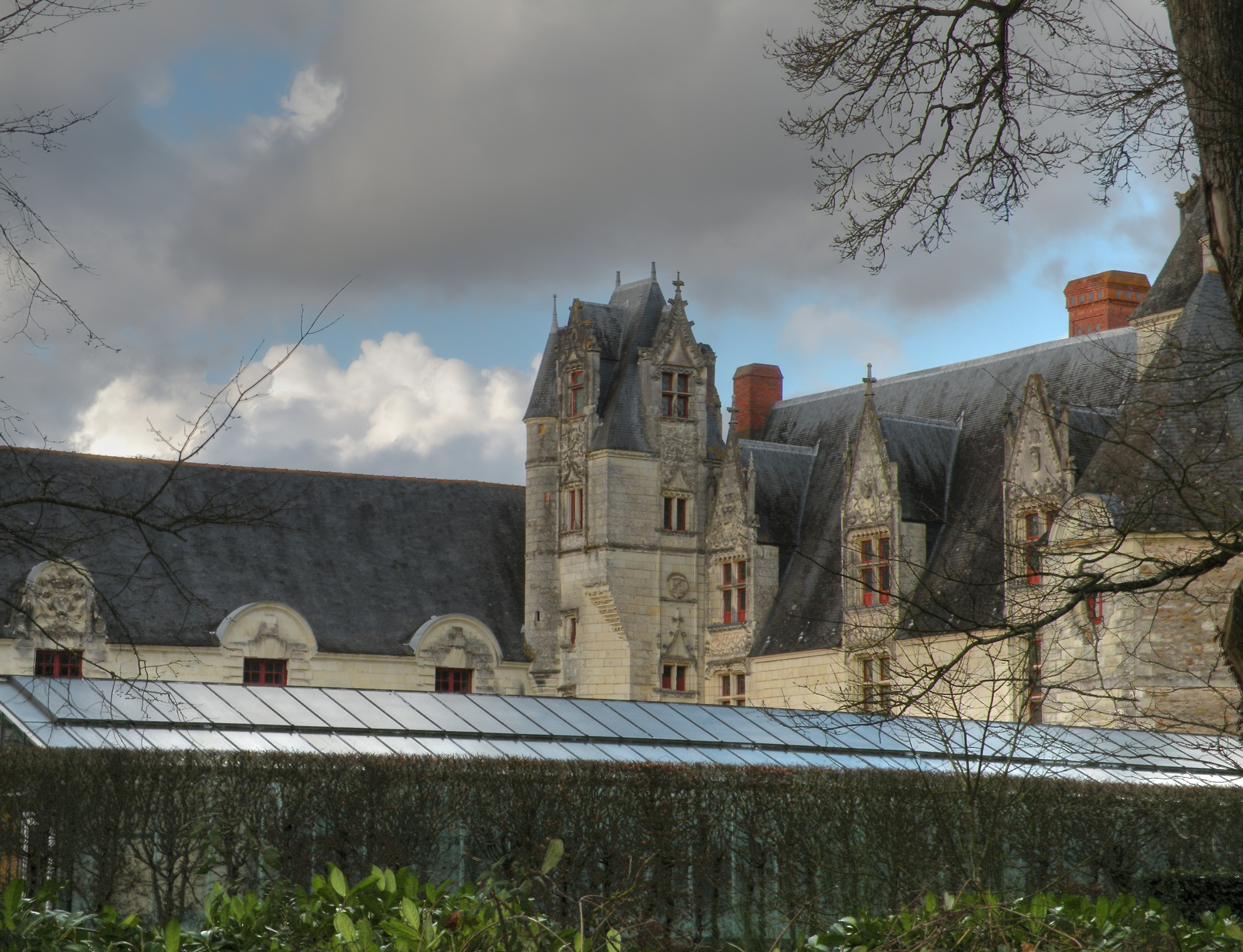
Modern glasshouses contrast with 16th-century stonework at the château

The style of the château, under its high-pitched slate roofs, bears some comparison to the central Loire estates of Château de Blois and Château de Chambord. However, Château de Goulaine was built much earlier and in a more conservative style.

== Butterfly aviary ==
Since 1984, hundreds of tropical butterflies are showcased in an aviary, flying freely among tropical plants. This project was initiated by Marquis Robert de Goulaine (1933–2010).

== LU Museum ==
In the older stables, one can visit the LU Museum to see the art and advertising collection of the brand of biscuits. There are 500 works of art (paintings, sculptures). The brand is very important in Nantes because the production of "le Petit Beurre" biscuits was in the "quai Baco" in the factories of the family. Today, the brand history is told with their works of art.

== Beurre blanc ==
According to one telling of the story, as favored by the American chef Bobby Flay, the white sauce beurre blanc was allegedly invented in the kitchen of Château de Goulaine by the head cook, Madame Clémence Lefeuvre.

== See also ==
- List of oldest companies
