= Tibbloc =

Tibbloc is a French company specializing in multi-energy equipment rental, founded in 2007 and based in Saint-Julien-de-Concelles, near Nantes.

== Activity ==
Tibbloc is an independent French equipment rental company specializing in temporary thermal solutions for heating, cooling, steam generation, air treatment and compressed air systems. Founded in 2007 and headquartered in Saint-Julien-de-Concelles, the company operates through 9 regional branches - including 8 locations across France (Lille, Paris, Metz, Lyon, Marseille, Angers, Nantes, Fos-sur-Mer) and 1 in Belgium (Vilvorde).

Tibbloc
- Type: Private
- Founded: 2007
- Founder: Serge Brunerie; Gilles Bertrand; Mickaël Hamon
- Headquarters: Saint-Julien-de-Concelles, France
- Key people: Eric Merilhou (CEO)
- Website: www.tibbloc.fr

== History ==
Tibbloc was founded in 2007 by Serge Brunerie and Gilles Bertrand. Mickaël Hamon joined them in 2013.

In July 2020, investment firm Ciclad acquired 75% of the company. The founders remained as minority shareholders. At that time, the company had around 70 employees and generated €19 million in revenue. In 2021, Tibbloc reached €24 million in revenue.

In 2023, the company acquired EnergyMode, an Austrian company specializing in mobile boiler rentals. The following year (2024), Tibbloc acquired Linkair, a French provider of temporary air solutions, including dehumidification and industrial air conditioning.

In December 2024, Gimv, a European investment firm listed in Brussels, acquired a majority stake in Tibbloc. The founders and management team, including Chairman, Éric Merilhou, and CEO, Yann Dauce, retained ownership stakes.

As of 2024, Tibbloc employs 130 people and generates €40 million in annual revenue.
