= Clémence Lefeuvre =

French chef

Clémence Lefeuvre (née Praud) (born 1860 in Saint-Julien-de-Concelles - 1932) was a French chef and restaurateur best known for being the inventor of the beurre blanc or white butter sauce.

== Early life ==
Clemence Praud was born in a house on the south bank of the Loire, along the Levée de La Divatte in the hamlet of La Chebuette. She took the name of Clemence Lefeuvre after her marriage with Leon Lefeuvre, a local stonemason.

== Invention of beurre blanc ==
According to records, three customers came to her establishment "La Buvette De La Marine" for lunch and she wanted to serve the pike that they ordered with some béarnaise sauce. However, she forgot to add the tarragon and egg yolks when preparing the sauce, thus accidentally inventing the beurre blanc sauce. Some sources also claim that this invention occurred while she worked as a cook for the Marquis de Goulaine at Château de Goulaine.

== Legacy ==
Apart from inventing a sauce used by many restaurants worldwide, she was also honoured with an oenology prize called the "Clémence-Lefeuvre Grand Prix du Muscadet" in the Muscadet, France region being named after her.

Aristide Briand, long-time prime minister of France and Nobel Peace Prize laureate, said at her death in 1932 that it "was a bit like national mourning"

The Clémence-Lefeuvre road in her hometown, Saint-Julien-de-Concelles was also named after her. In Vertou, an alley called the Clémence-Lefeuvre alley was also named in her honour.
