= Prunier =

Prunier is a French surname. Notable people with the surname include:

- Alfred Prunier (1848–1925), French chef and restaurant owner
- Camille Prunier, French wrestler
- William Prunier (born 1967), French footballer and manager
- Gérard Prunier (born 1942), French academic and historian
