= La Regrippière =

- Commune
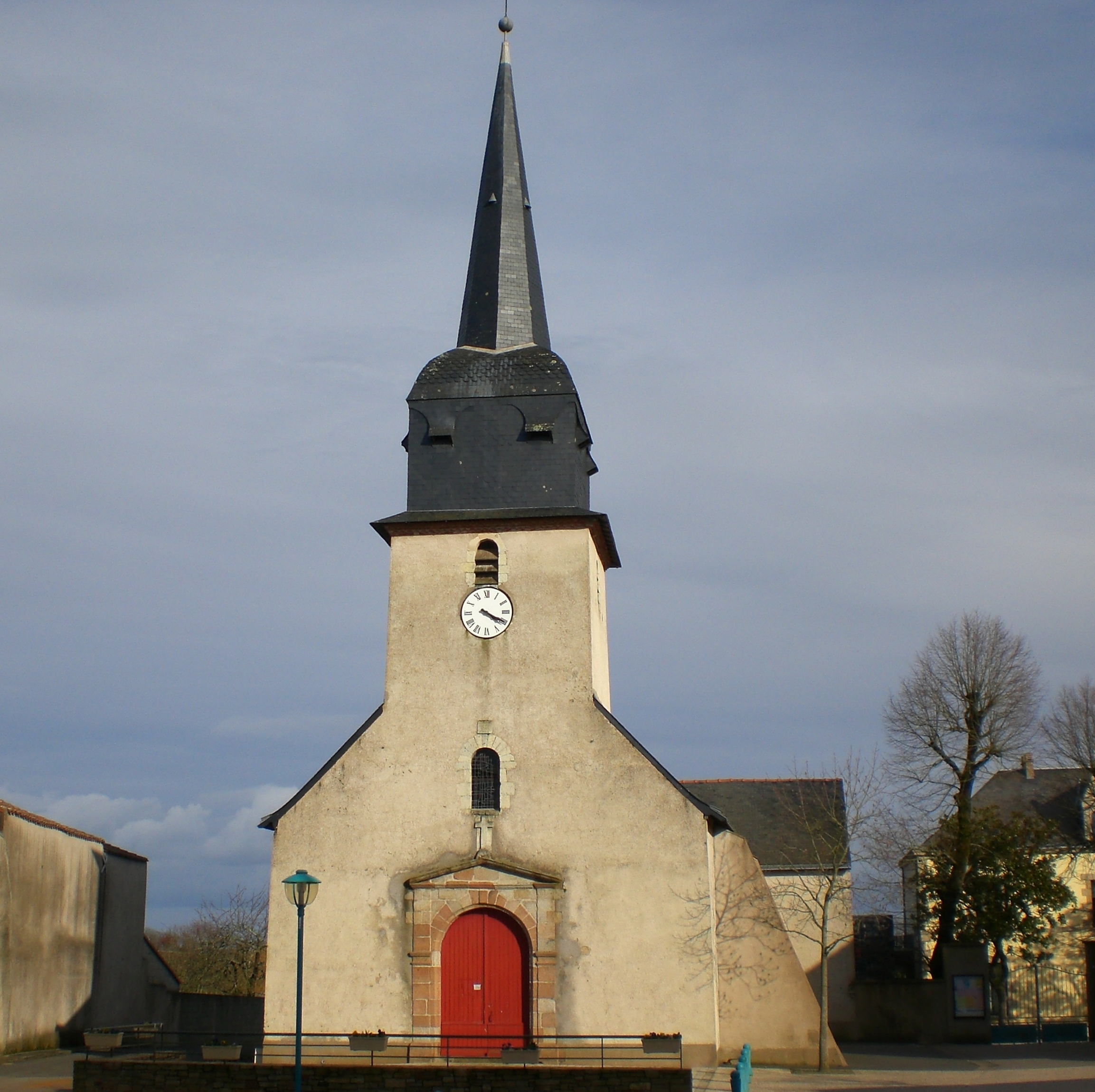

- Coat of arms
- Location of La Regrippière
- Location within France Location within Pays de la Loire
- Coordinates: 47°10′57″N 1°10′30″W
- Country: France
- Region: Pays de la Loire
- Department: Loire-Atlantique
- Arrondissement: Nantes
- Canton: Vallet
- Intercommunality: Sèvre et Loire

Government
  - Mayor (2020–2026): Pascal Evin
- Area^{1}: 18.17 km^{2} (7.02 sq mi)
- Highest elevation: 101 m (331 ft)
- Lowest elevation: 42 m (138 ft)
- Population (2023): 1,609
  - Density: 88.55/km^{2} (229.4/sq mi)
- Time zone: UTC+01:00 (CET)
  - Summer (DST): UTC+02:00 (CEST)
- INSEE/Postal code: 44140 /44330
- ^{1} French Land Register data, which excludes lakes, ponds, glaciers > 1 km^{2} (0.386 sq mi or 247 acres) and river estuaries.

La Regrippière (French pronunciation: [la ʁəɡʁipjɛʁ]; Breton: Skouvlant) is a commune in the Loire-Atlantique department in western France.

== Population ==
Historical population
Year	Pop.	±% p.a.
1968	957	—
1975	850	−1.68%
1982	905	+0.90%
1990	1,093	+2.39%
1999	1,088	−0.05%
2007	1,469	+3.82%
2012	1,534	+0.87%
2017	1,527	−0.09%
2023	1,609	+0.88%
Source: INSEE

== See also ==
- Communes of the Loire-Atlantique department
