= Financier (cake) =

Small French almond cake

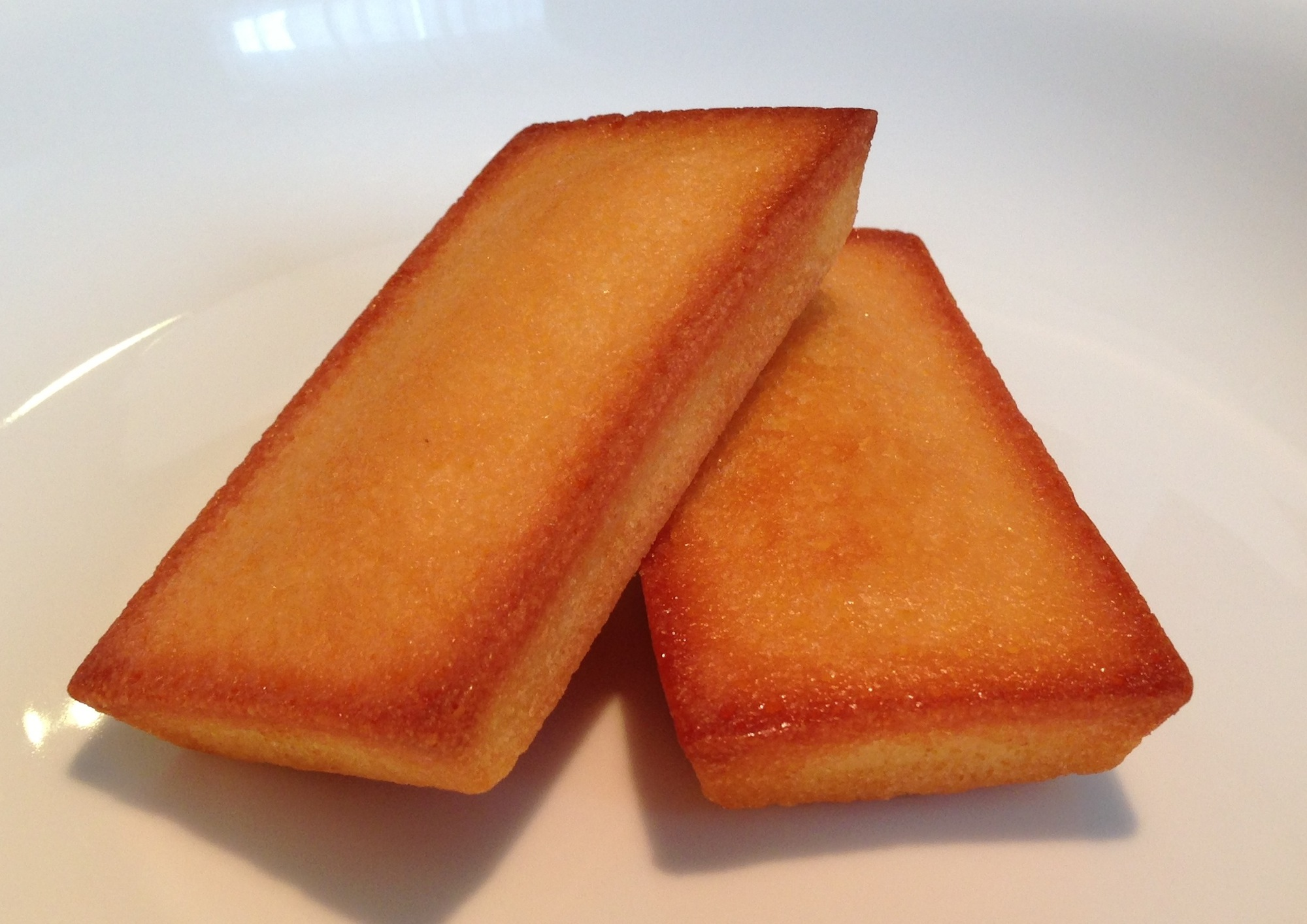
- Two rectangular financiers
- Type: Cake
- Place of origin: France
- Main ingredients: Beurre noisette; almond flour or ground almonds

A financier (French pronunciation: [fi.nɑ̃.sje], fee-nahn-see-AY) is a small French almond cake, flavoured with beurre noisette and usually baked in a small mold. Light and moist with a crisp, eggshell-like exterior, the traditional financier also contains egg whites, flour, and powdered sugar. The molds are usually small rectangular loaves similar in size to petits fours.

== History ==
The financier originates from the French region of Lorraine. The Visitandine order of nuns in the 17th century produced a small round almond cake called a Visitandine (French pronunciation: [vi.zi.tɑ̃.din]), which is thought to have stemmed from a desire to find a second life for egg whites, whose yolks were used for paintings and illuminated manuscripts. The Visitandine traditionally was different from the financier by the use of butter cooked at a low temperature, as opposed to browned butter. It was in the 19th century that financiers, as we know them today, gained prominence in Paris. The change in shape and name is attributed by Pierre Lacam, in Memorial Historique de la Patisserie, published in 1890, to a pâtissier named Lasne, who worked near the Paris Stock Exchange. Lasne adapted the traditional recipe of the nuns to create a smaller, more practical cake, designed to meet the needs of businessmen who needed a quick, clean snack.

The name financier is said to derive from the traditional rectangular mold, which resembles a bar of gold when the Swiss reinterpreted the financier and baked it in this form. Some French bakeries still sell this cake under the name of visitandine.

According to another tradition, the cake became popular in the financial district of Paris surrounding the Paris stock exchange, as the cake could easily be stored in the pocket for long periods without being damaged.

== See also ==
- List of almond dishes
