= La Boissière-du-Doré =

La Boissière-du-Doré La Boécierr (Gallo) Beuzid-an-Doured (Breton)
- Commune
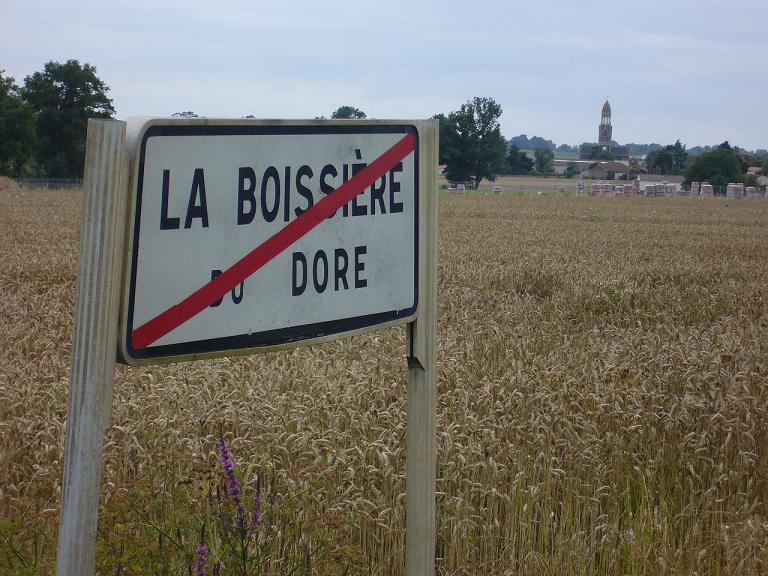

- Coat of arms
- Location of La Boissière-du-Doré
- Location within France Location within Pays de la Loire
- Coordinates: 47°13′59″N 1°13′08″W
- Country: France
- Region: Pays de la Loire
- Department: Loire-Atlantique
- Arrondissement: Nantes
- Canton: Vallet
- Intercommunality: Sèvre et Loire

Government
  - Mayor (2022–2026): Catherine Garcia-Senotier
- Area^{1}: 9.41 km^{2} (3.63 sq mi)
- Highest elevation: 106 m (348 ft)
- Lowest elevation: 50 m (160 ft)
- Population (2023): 1,106
  - Density: 118/km^{2} (304/sq mi)
- Time zone: UTC+01:00 (CET)
  - Summer (DST): UTC+02:00 (CEST)
- INSEE/Postal code: 44016 /44430
- ^{1} French Land Register data, which excludes lakes, ponds, glaciers > 1 km^{2} (0.386 sq mi or 247 acres) and river estuaries.

La Boissière-du-Doré (French pronunciation: [la bwasjɛʁ dy dɔʁe]; Gallo: La Boécierr, Breton: Beuzid-an-Doured, before 1962: La Boissière) is a commune in the Loire-Atlantique department in western France.

== Population ==
Historical population
Year	Pop.	±% p.a.
1968	523	—
1975	517	−0.16%
1982	551	+0.91%
1990	627	+1.63%
1999	672	+0.77%
2007	845	+2.90%
2012	958	+2.54%
2017	1,045	+1.75%
2023	1,106	+0.95%
Source: INSEE

== See also ==
- Communes of the Loire-Atlantique department
