= Beurre noir =

French butter dish

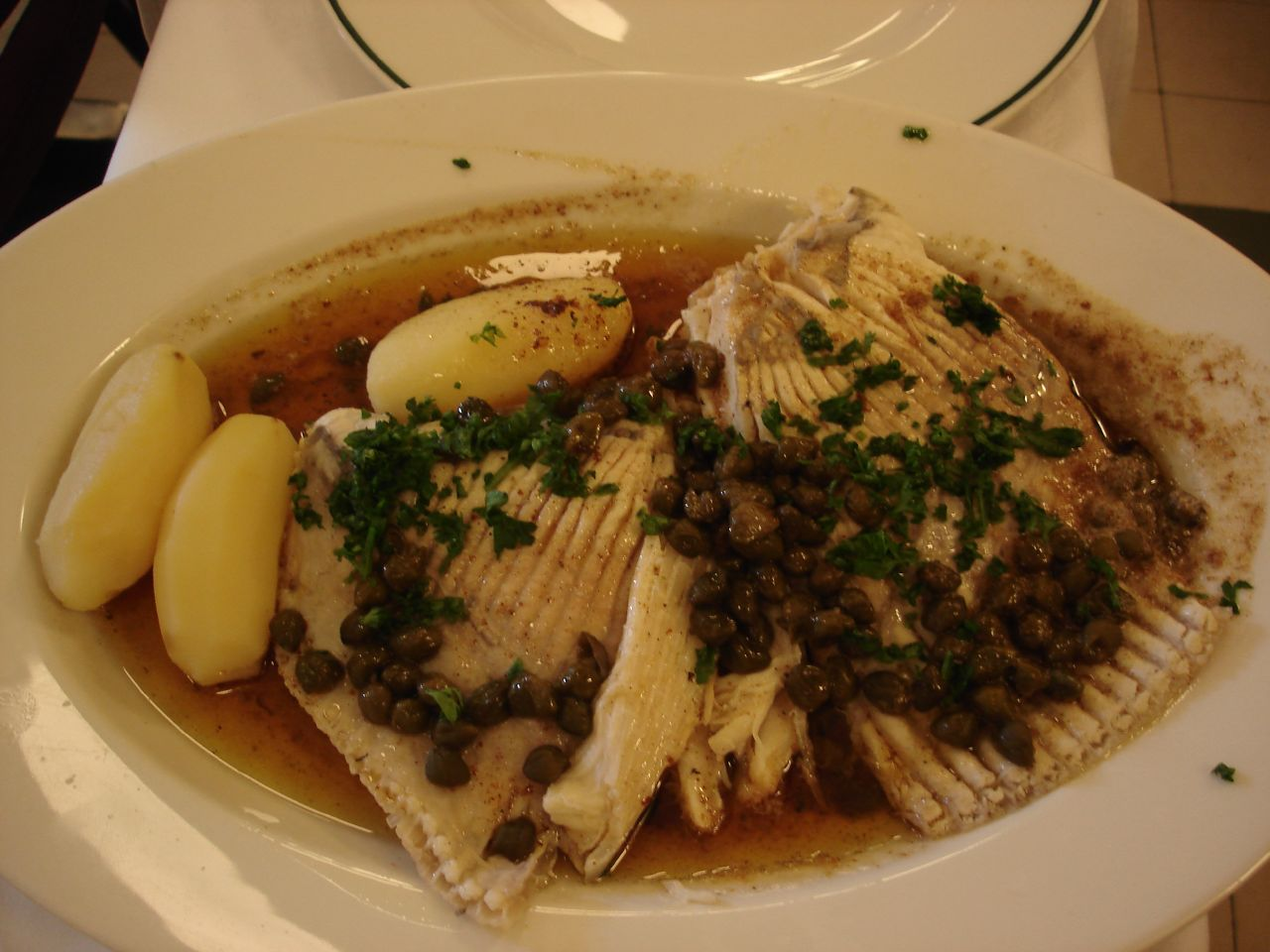
- A plate of skate with beurre noir
- Type: Sauce
- Place of origin: French
- Main ingredients: liquid butter

Beurre noir (French pronunciation: [bœʁ nwaʁ]; French: black butter) is melted butter that is cooked over low heat until the milk solids turn a very dark brown. As soon as this happens, acid is carefully added to the hot butter, usually lemon juice or a type of vinegar. Some recipes also add a sprig of parsley, which is removed from the hot butter before the acid is added. It is typically served with eggs, fish, or certain types of vegetables.

== See also ==
- Beurre blanc
- Beurre noisette
- French cuisine
- List of sauces
