= Vallet =

Vallet Gwaled (Breton)
- Commune
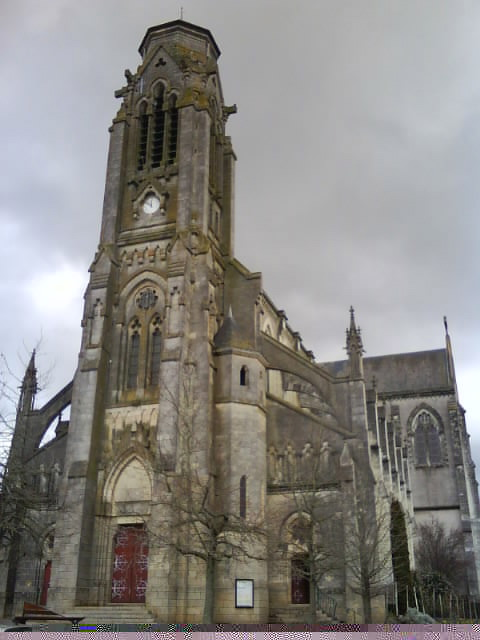
- The church of Our Lady, in Vallet

- Coat of arms
- Location of Vallet
- Location within France Location within Pays de la Loire
- Coordinates: 47°09′44″N 1°15′56″W
- Country: France
- Region: Pays de la Loire
- Department: Loire-Atlantique
- Arrondissement: Nantes
- Canton: Vallet
- Intercommunality: Sèvre et Loire

Government
  - Mayor (2020–2026): Jérôme Marchais
- Area^{1}: 58.96 km^{2} (22.76 sq mi)
- Highest elevation: 98 m (322 ft)
- Lowest elevation: 6 m (20 ft)
- Population (2023): 9,495
  - Density: 161.0/km^{2} (417.1/sq mi)
- Demonym(s): Valletaise, Valletais
- Time zone: UTC+01:00 (CET)
  - Summer (DST): UTC+02:00 (CEST)
- INSEE/Postal code: 44212 /44330
- Website: www.vallet.fr
- ^{1} French Land Register data, which excludes lakes, ponds, glaciers > 1 km^{2} (0.386 sq mi or 247 acres) and river estuaries.

Vallet (French pronunciation: [valɛt]; Breton: Gwaled) is a commune in the Loire-Atlantique department in western France. The town is located in the Muscadet region.

Vallet is twinned with Alcester, Warwickshire, United Kingdom.

== Population ==
Historical population
Year	Pop.	±% p.a.
1968	4,603	—
1975	4,984	+1.14%
1982	5,717	+1.98%
1990	6,116	+0.85%
1999	6,807	+1.20%
2007	8,057	+2.13%
2012	8,579	+1.26%
2017	9,015	+1.00%
2023	9,495	+0.87%
Source: INSEE

== See also ==
- Communes of the Loire-Atlantique department
