= La Remaudière =

- Commune
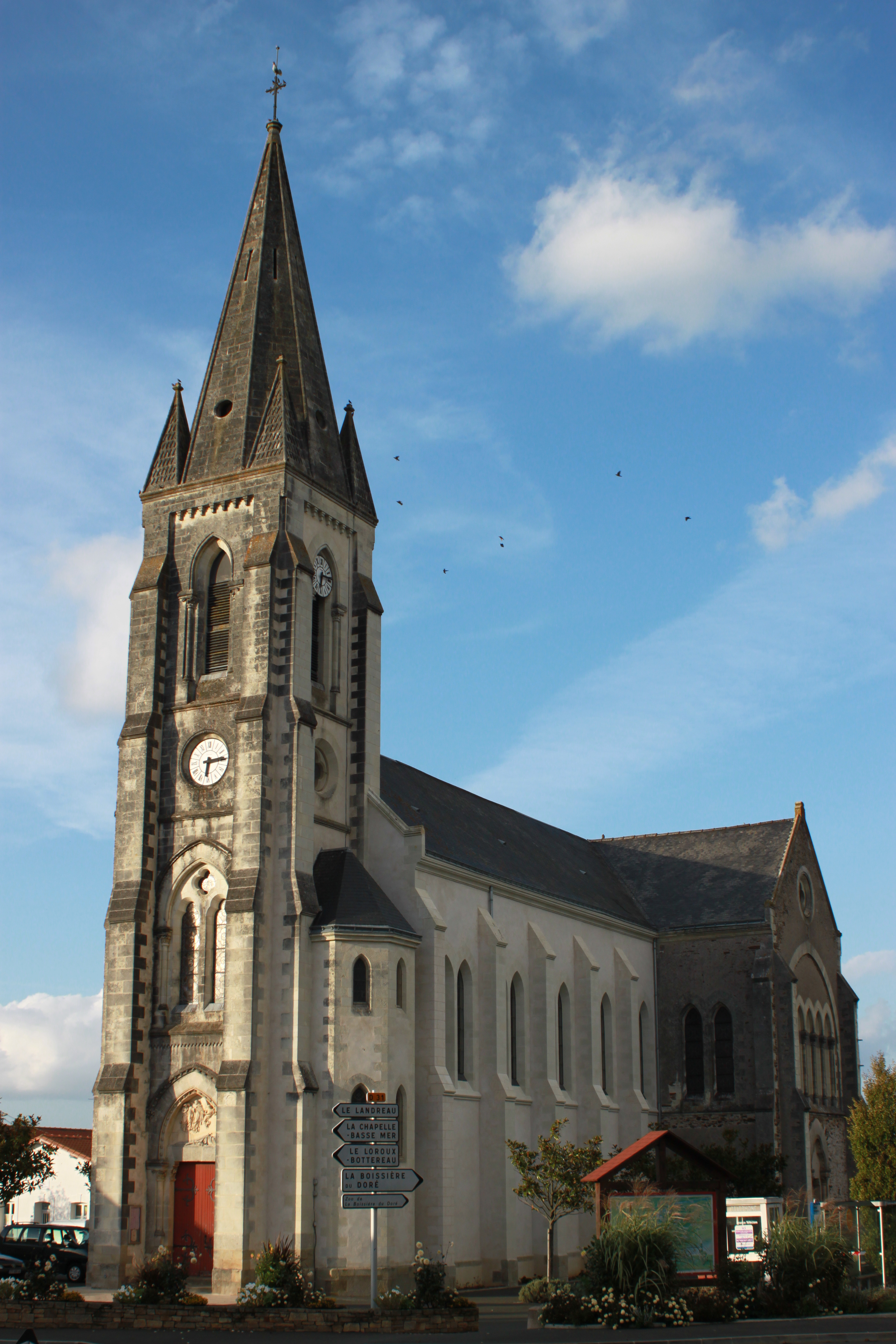

- Coat of arms
- Location of La Remaudière
- Location within France Location within Pays de la Loire
- Coordinates: 47°14′18″N 1°14′32″W
- Country: France
- Region: Pays de la Loire
- Department: Loire-Atlantique
- Arrondissement: Nantes
- Canton: Vallet
- Intercommunality: Sèvre et Loire

Government
  - Mayor (2020–2026): Anne Choblet
- Area^{1}: 12.98 km^{2} (5.01 sq mi)
- Highest elevation: 101 m (331 ft)
- Lowest elevation: 38 m (125 ft)
- Population (2023): 1,303
  - Density: 100.4/km^{2} (260.0/sq mi)
- Time zone: UTC+01:00 (CET)
  - Summer (DST): UTC+02:00 (CEST)
- INSEE/Postal code: 44141 /44430
- ^{1} French Land Register data, which excludes lakes, ponds, glaciers > 1 km^{2} (0.386 sq mi or 247 acres) and river estuaries.

La Remaudière (French pronunciation: [la ʁəmodjɛʁ]; Breton: Kerravaot) is a commune in the Loire-Atlantique department in western France.

== Population ==
Historical population
Year	Pop.	±% p.a.
1968	747	—
1975	710	−0.72%
1982	730	+0.40%
1990	795	+1.07%
1999	814	+0.26%
2007	1,070	+3.48%
2012	1,219	+2.64%
2017	1,285	+1.06%
2023	1,303	+0.23%
Source: INSEE

== See also ==
- Communes of the Loire-Atlantique department
