= La Chapelle-Basse-Mer =

- Part of Divatte-sur-Loire
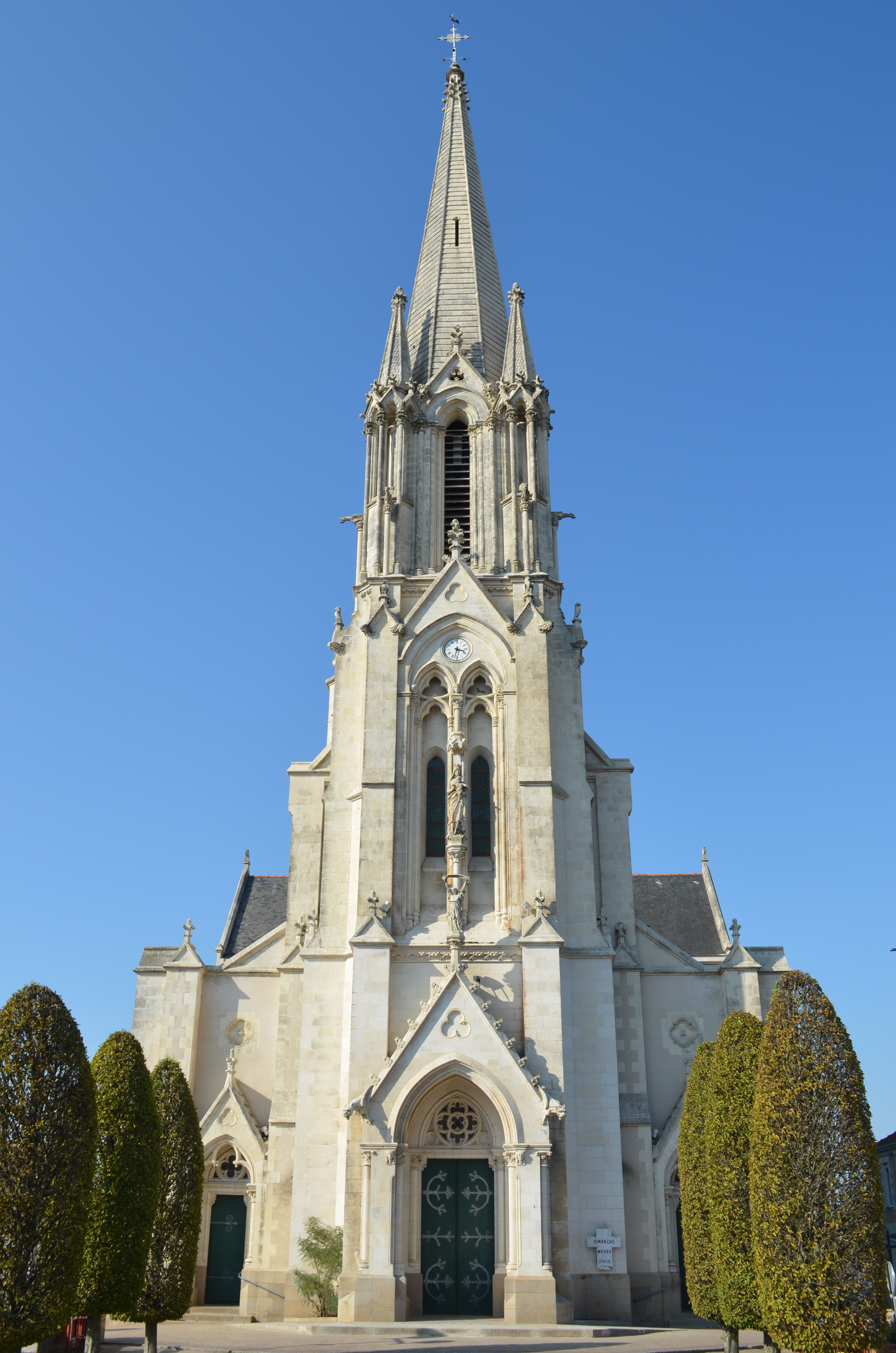
- The church of Our Lady of the Assumption, in La Chapelle-Basse-Mer

- Coat of arms
- Location of La Chapelle-Basse-Mer
- Location within France Location within Pays de la Loire
- Coordinates: 47°09′44″N 1°12′05″W
- Country: France
- Region: Pays de la Loire
- Department: Loire-Atlantique
- Arrondissement: Nantes
- Canton: Vallet
- Commune: Divatte-sur-Loire
- Area^{1}: 22.14 km^{2} (8.55 sq mi)
- Highest elevation: 79 m (259 ft)
- Lowest elevation: 1 m (3.3 ft)
- Population (2022): 5,807
  - Density: 262.3/km^{2} (679.3/sq mi)
- Demonym(s): Chapelaines, Chapelains
- Time zone: UTC+01:00 (CET)
  - Summer (DST): UTC+02:00 (CEST)
- Postal code: 44450
- ^{1} French Land Register data, which excludes lakes, ponds, glaciers > 1 km^{2} (0.386 sq mi or 247 acres) and river estuaries.

La Chapelle-Basse-Mer (French pronunciation: [la ʃapɛl bas mɛʁ]; Occitan: Chapel-Baz-Meur) is a former commune in the Loire-Atlantique department in western France. On 1 January 2016, it was merged into the new commune of Divatte-sur-Loire.

== See also ==
- Communes of the Loire-Atlantique department
