= Mouzillon =

- Commune
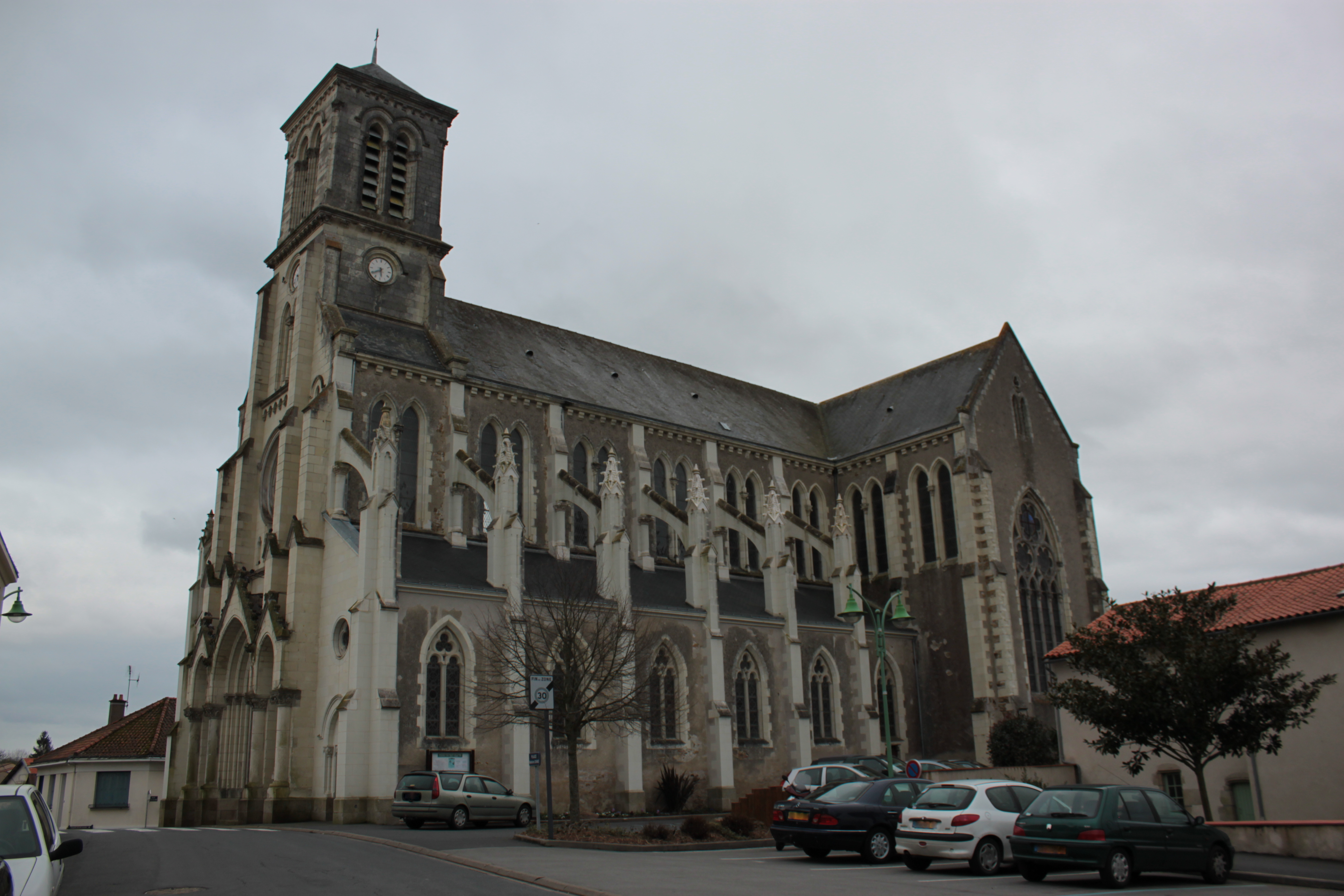

- Coat of arms
- Location of Mouzillon
- Location within France Location within Pays de la Loire
- Coordinates: 47°08′32″N 1°16′52″W
- Country: France
- Region: Pays de la Loire
- Department: Loire-Atlantique
- Arrondissement: Nantes
- Canton: Vallet
- Intercommunality: Sèvre et Loire

Government
  - Mayor (2020–2026): Jean-Marc Jounier
- Area^{1}: 16.5 km^{2} (6.4 sq mi)
- Highest elevation: 78 m (256 ft)
- Lowest elevation: 9 m (30 ft)
- Population (2023): 2,893
  - Density: 175/km^{2} (454/sq mi)
- Time zone: UTC+01:00 (CET)
  - Summer (DST): UTC+02:00 (CEST)
- INSEE/Postal code: 44108 /44330
- ^{1} French Land Register data, which excludes lakes, ponds, glaciers > 1 km^{2} (0.386 sq mi or 247 acres) and river estuaries.

Mouzillon (French pronunciation: [muzijɔ̃]; Breton: Maodilon) is a commune in the Loire-Atlantique department in western France.

== Population ==
Historical population

Year	Pop.	±% p.a.
1793	1,475	—
1821	1,513	+0.09%
1846	1,388	−0.34%
1872	1,504	+0.31%
1901	1,368	−0.33%
1926	1,137	−0.74%
1946	1,187	+0.22%
1962	1,330	+0.71%
1968	1,357	+0.34%

Year	Pop.	±% p.a.
1975	1,404	+0.49%
1982	1,554	+1.46%
1990	1,679	+0.97%
1999	1,760	+0.52%
2007	2,466	+4.31%
2012	2,676	+1.65%
2017	2,830	+1.13%
2023	2,893	+0.37%

Source: EHESS and INSEE (1968-2023)

== Culture ==
Mouzillon is known as a producer of Muscadet wine as well as dry biscuit called the Petit Mouzillon. The two are traditionally consumed together.

== See also ==
- Communes of the Loire-Atlantique department
