= Divatte-sur-Loire =

Divatte-sur-Loire Diwazh-Liger (Breton)
- Commune
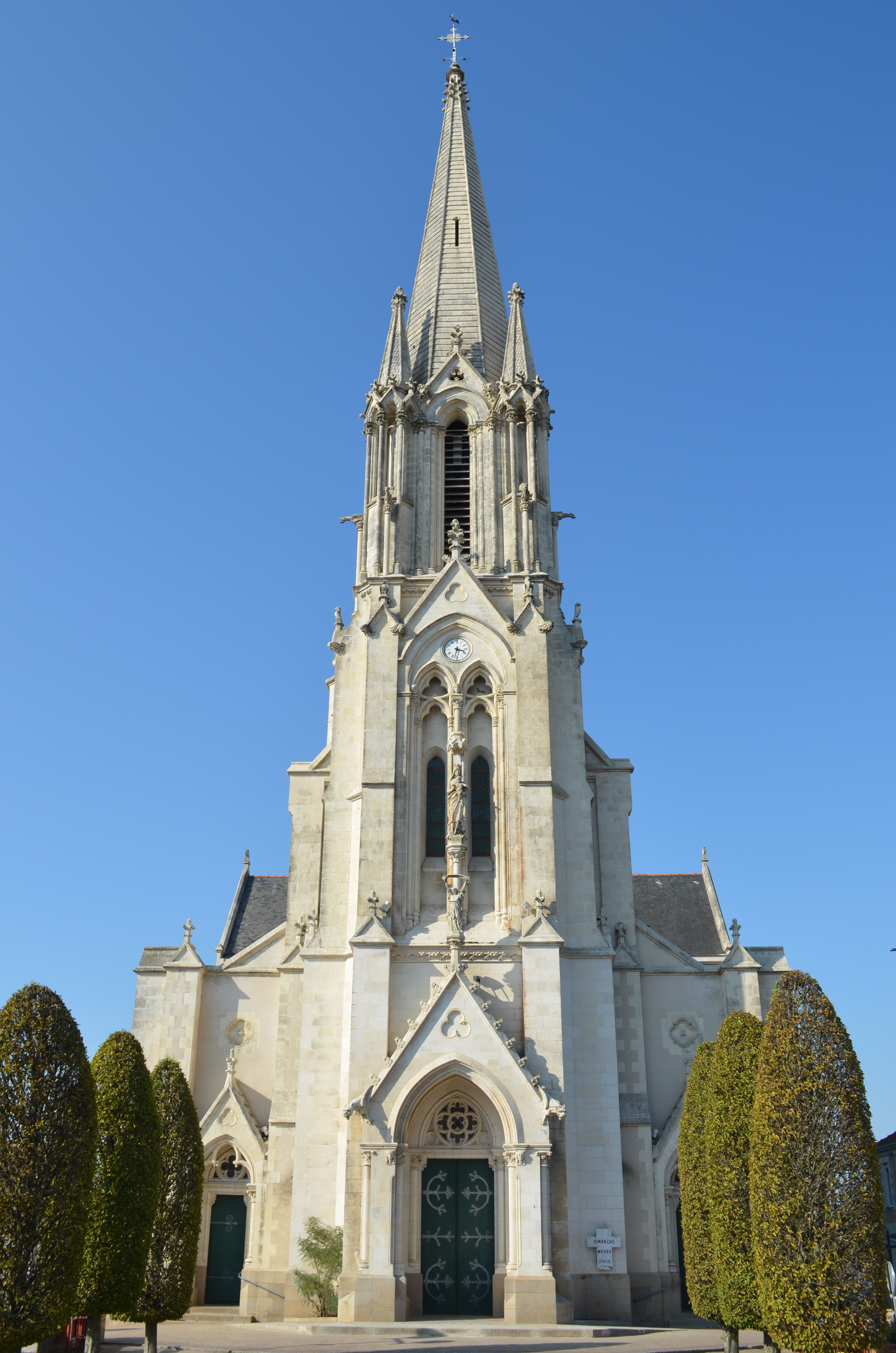
- Location of Divatte-sur-Loire
- Location within France Location within Pays de la Loire
- Coordinates: 47°16′19″N 1°20′24″W
- Country: France
- Region: Pays de la Loire
- Department: Loire-Atlantique
- Arrondissement: Nantes
- Canton: Vallet

Government
  - Mayor (2020–2026): Christelle Braud
- Area^{1}: 33.90 km^{2} (13.09 sq mi)
- Highest elevation: 84 m (276 ft)
- Lowest elevation: 1 m (3.3 ft)
- Population (2023): 7,252
  - Density: 213.9/km^{2} (554.1/sq mi)
- Time zone: UTC+01:00 (CET)
  - Summer (DST): UTC+02:00 (CEST)
- INSEE/Postal code: 44029 /44450
- ^{1} French Land Register data, which excludes lakes, ponds, glaciers > 1 km^{2} (0.386 sq mi or 247 acres) and river estuaries.

Divatte-sur-Loire (French pronunciation: [divat syʁ lwaʁ], literally Divatte on Loire; Breton: Diwazh-Liger) is a commune in the department of Loire-Atlantique, western France. The municipality was established on 1 January 2016 by merger of the former communes of La Chapelle-Basse-Mer and Barbechat.

== Population ==
Population data refer to the commune in its geography as of January 2025.

Historical population
Year	Pop.	±% p.a.
1968	3,283	—
1975	3,536	+1.07%
1982	4,368	+3.06%
1990	4,917	+1.49%
1999	5,334	+0.91%
2007	6,109	+1.71%
2012	6,541	+1.38%
2017	6,844	+0.91%
2023	7,252	+0.97%
Source: INSEE

== See also ==
- Communes of the Loire-Atlantique department
