= Madame Prunier =

French restaurateur and food writer (1904–1976)

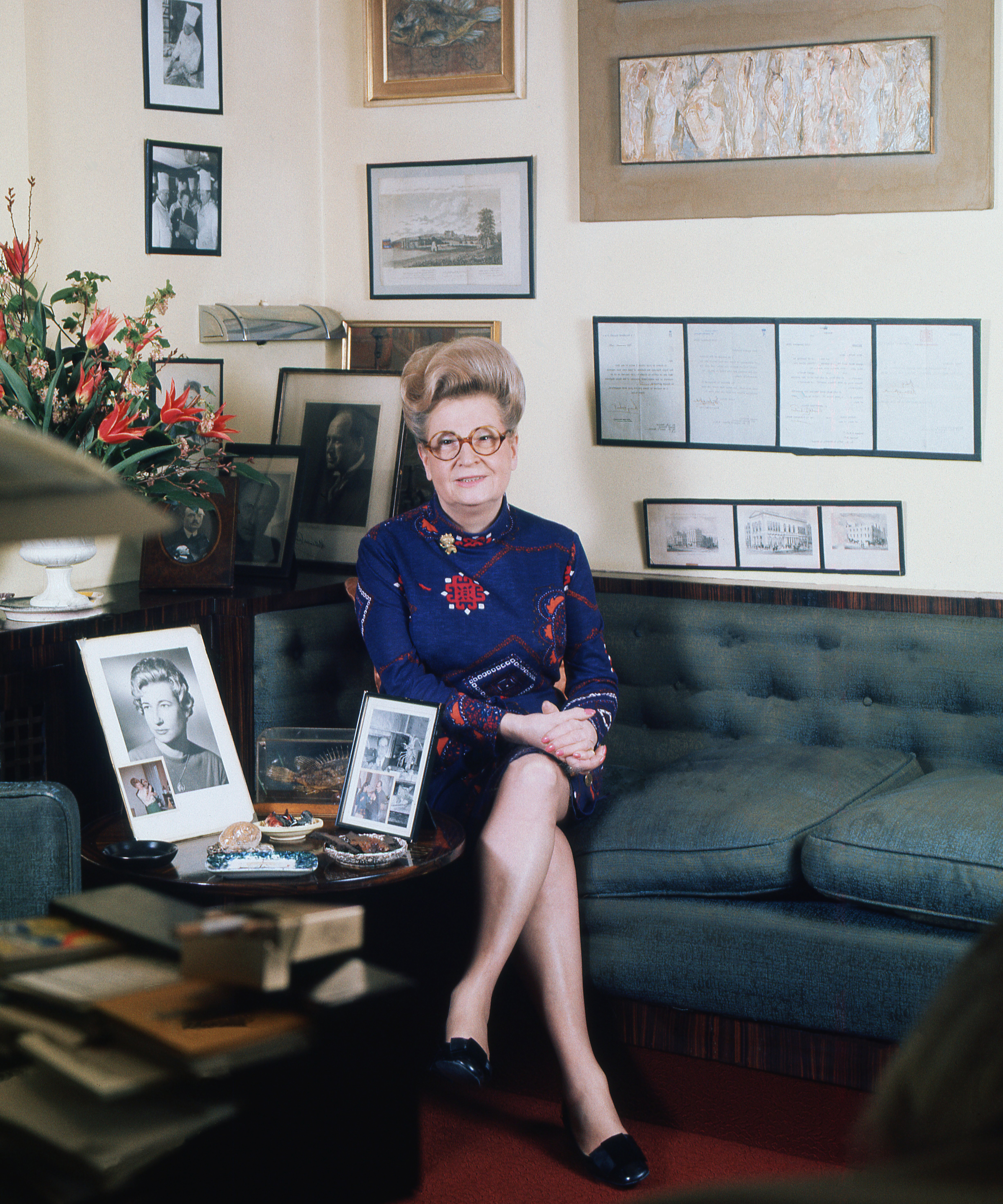
Madame Prunier 1972 Credit: Allan Warren

Simone Prunier (1904–1976), known as Madam Prunier, was a French restaurateur and food writer who established a well-known French restaurant in London.

== Biography ==
Simone Prunier was born in 1904. Her grandfather, the French restaurateur Alfred Prunier, had opened La Maison Prunier, the first Prunier fish restaurant, in Paris in 1872. La Maison Prunier became famous for the fresh fish and shellfish that was delivered daily by train from the sea, a novelty at the time. When Alfred Prunier died, his son Emile Prunier (Simone Prunier's father) took over the restaurant, expanding and modernizing it. When Emile died in 1925, the then 22-year old Simone Prunier took over the business.

In 1934, Prunier and her husband closed the Paris restaurant and opened the Prunier St James's restaurant in London. Many of her wealthy clients had stopped coming to Paris due to war fears. In addition, her English clients had urged her to move to London for years. Prunier St James's quickly gained a reputation for its outstanding fish dishes. Edward Prince of Wales used to walk up to the restaurant from St James's Palace with Wallis Simpson for lunch.

In 1938, Prunier published her book A Classic Way with Fish. Rick Stein credits it as being "a very influential book in my early days of fish cookery"

Prunier had a strong reputation for the quality of her fish dishes at Prunier St. James as well as for her hospitality. After World War II, the restaurant clientele included some deposed heads of state who had visited the London and Paris restaurants when in power before the war.

In 1954, Prunier was made Chevalier de la Legion d'Honneur, France's highest honour, in recognition of her services to maintaining the standards and recognition of French cuisine. As her father had said: "It's true it's cost me a lot of work. It's true it's cost me a lot of worry. But what a magnificent business it is, quelle belle Maison."

In her retirement, Prunier wrote her biography La Maison: The History of Prunier published in 1957. The Prunier St James's restaurant closed in 1976.

== Selected bibliography ==
Madame Prunier's Fish Cookery Book, pub. Quadrille (1938)

Madame Prunier - La Maison: The History of Prunier, pub. Longsman (1957"
