= Beurre monté =

Melted butter sauce

- Type: Sauce
- Main ingredients: Butter

Beurre monté (French pronunciation: [bœʁ mɔ̃te], lit. 'mounted butter') refers to melted butter that remains emulsified, even at temperatures higher than that at which butter usually breaks down. Beurre monté may refer either to the melted butter sauce itself, or to the method of making it.

Butter is an emulsion of about 2% milk solids, 80% milk fats (clarified butter), and about 18% water. At 70 °C (158 °F), butter normally breaks down into its components parts, but in a beurre monté, the butter is heated in such a way that the butter can stay emulsified even up to 82–88 °C (180–190 °F). It can then be used in many ways, including as a sauce, as an ingredient for other sauces, as a poaching medium, or as a resting medium for cooked meat.

To make beurre monté, a very small quantity of water is boiled, i.e. 15–60 ml (1–4 tablespoons). Once water has come to a boil, the heat is turned down and cold butter is whisked into the water, one or two chunks at a time, adding more butter whenever the chunks have melted. Once the emulsion is started, more butter can be added at a time. Butter is continued to be added while whisking until the desired quantity of beurre monté is produced. The beurre monté must then be held warm, but under 88 °C (190 °F) or else it will break.

== See also ==
- List of sauces
- Beurre noisette
- Mayonnaise
- Ghee
