= Alfred Prunier =

French chef and restaurant owner

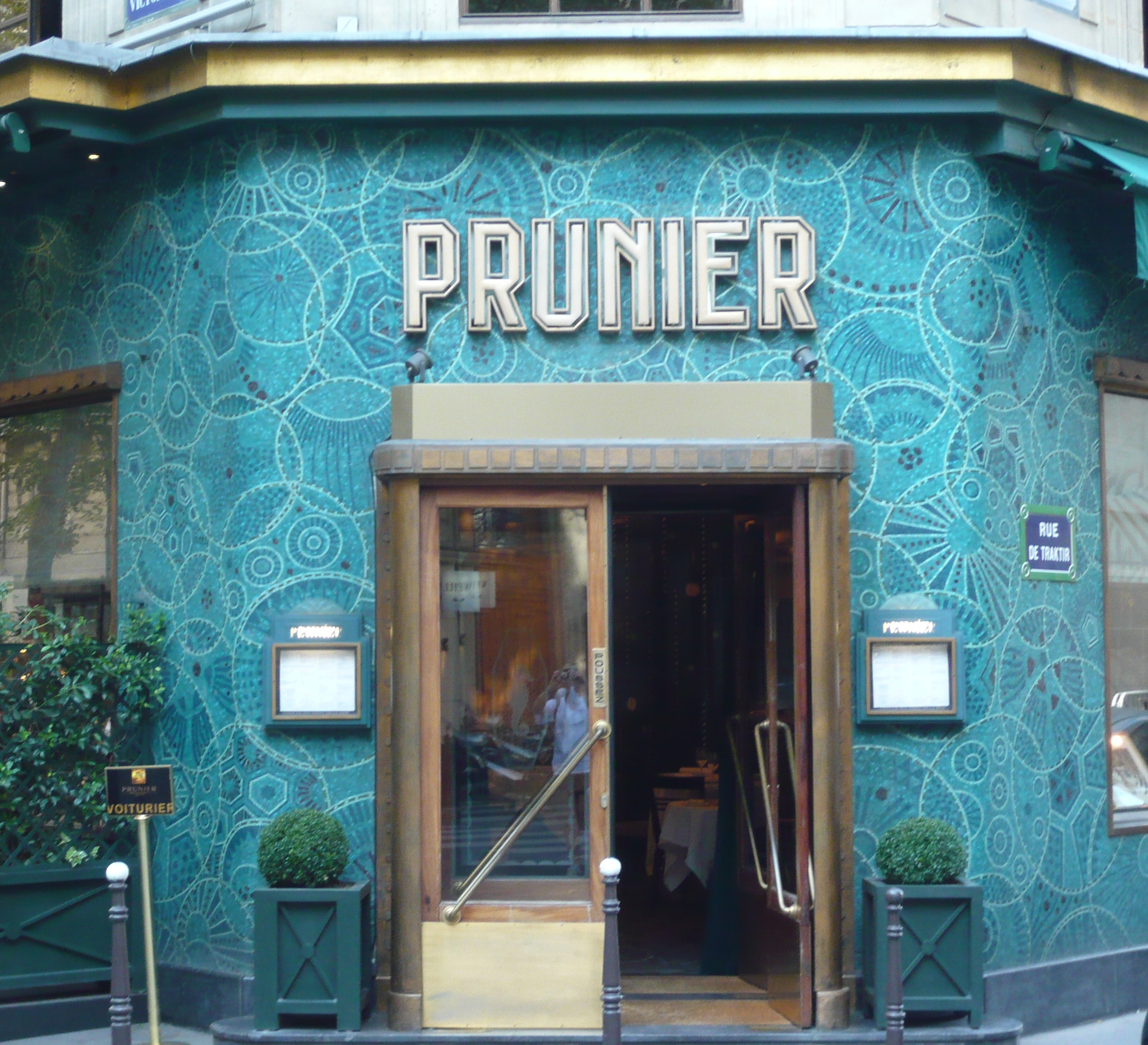
Restaurant Prunier at the corner of the Rue de Traktir

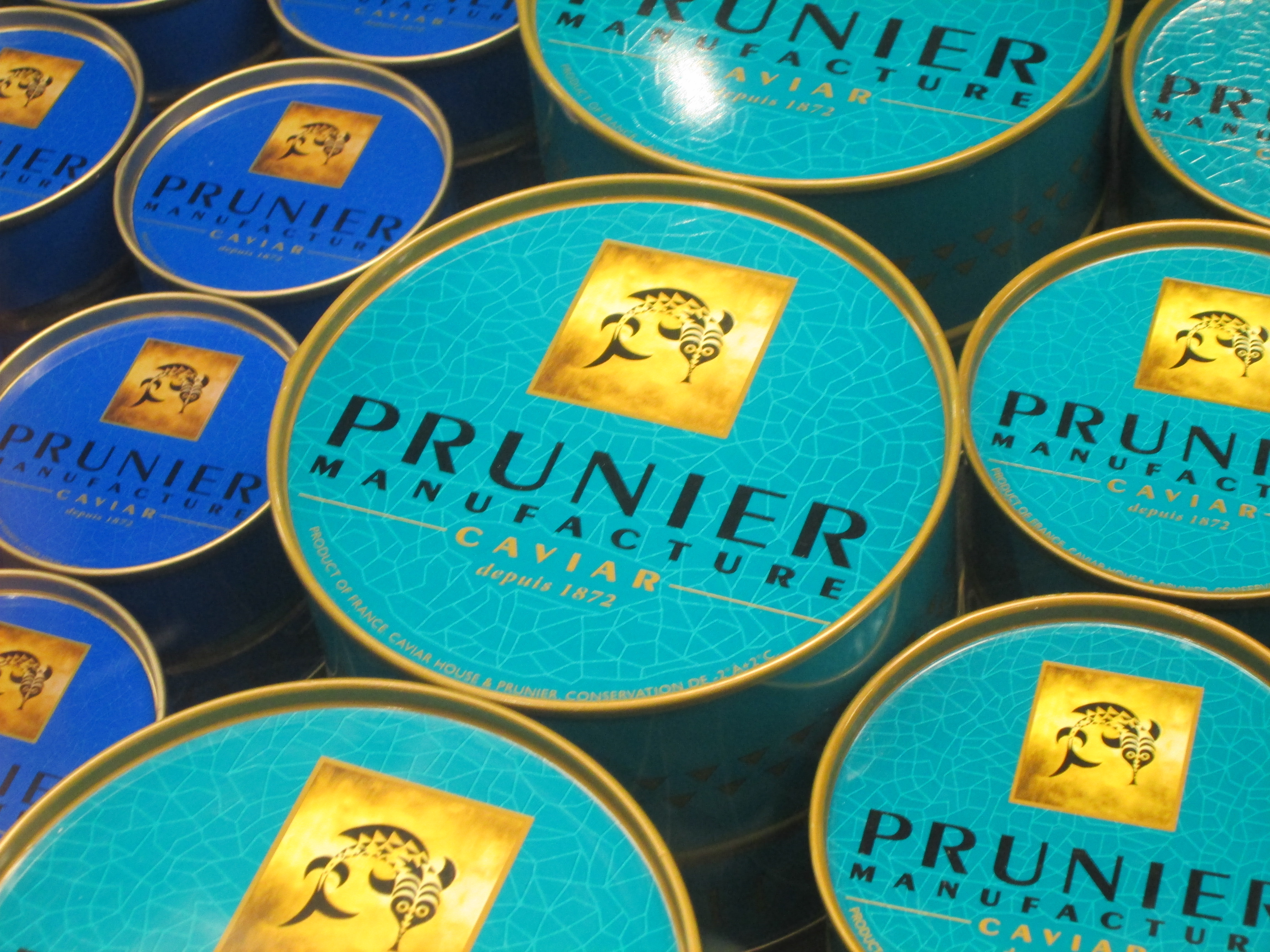
Prunier caviar

Alfred Prunier (French pronunciation: [alfʁɛd pʁynje]; 1848 in Yerville, France – 1925) was a French chef and restaurant owner.

Prunier was born in Yerville, Normandy, France. In 1872 Prunier and his wife Catherine opened a Parisian restaurant on Rue Duphot that bore his name. The same restaurant operated under the name Goumard, but closed down in 2022. His restaurant specialized in seafood, especially lobster, caviar, and oysters, and grilled entrées. The quality of the cuisine, the service, and the interior decor quickly made the restaurant a success, attracting famous writers such as Oscar Wilde, actors such as Sarah Bernhardt, politicians such as Georges Clemenceau, and aristocrats including Russian royalty.

In 1924 Prunier's son Émile opened another Prunier restaurant on the avenue Victor Hugo in Paris, which attracted writers such as F. Scott Fitzgerald and Ernest Hemingway. After Prunier's death in 1925, his daughter Simone took over the business and opened a third restaurant in London. The second restaurant still operates, but the London restaurant closed in 1976.

== See also ==
- Madame Prunier
