= Staffelter Hof =

Winery, distillery and guest house

Staffelter Hof

Staffelter Hof is a family-run winery, distillery and guest house situated in the small town of Kröv. It is located in the Bernkastel-Wittlich district of Rhineland-Palatinate, Germany. It is the oldest winery in the world that is still running, and is also the seventh oldest company in the world that remains continuously operating.

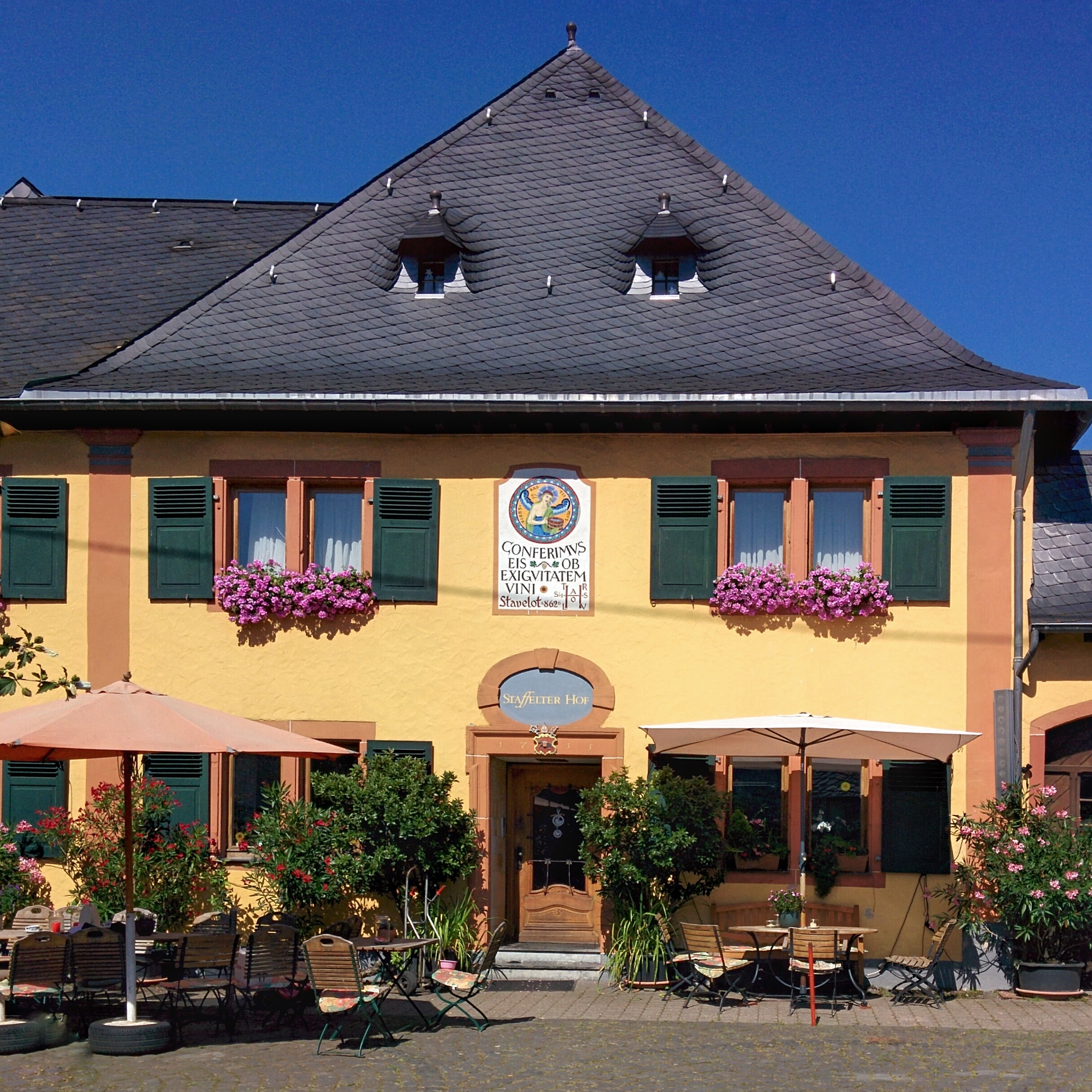
Staffelter Hof in 2016

== History ==
The Staffelter Hof name, originally belonging to a wine-producing abbey, goes as far back as 862 A.D. and is, therefore, one of the oldest companies in the world. The first written documentation of the Staffelter Hof abbey is on an original document now located in the city archives (Archives de l’État à Liège) of Liège, Belgium. Lands belonging to the Carolingian dynasty (580–876 AD), which spread as far as Kröv and beyond, home of the current winery, were donated to the abbey to be used as a source of income. These properties were in possession of the abbey until the establishment of the Napoleonic Code in 1804. In 1805, the land in Kröv was purchased by Peter Schneiders for 1773 Taler and subsequently passed down 7 generations to Jan Matthias Klein, the current winemaker who took over from his father, Gerd Klein, in 2005.

== Current business ==
=== Guest house ===
In 1960, the current guest house was established which consists of 4 double rooms and 6 apartments.

=== Distillery ===
The distillery at the property was established sometime after 1890 by Kilian Klein. Each year schnaps is produced from trester or marc, hefe, mirabell, cherries, apples, pears and plums as well as a few homemade liqueurs.

=== Wine production ===
There are 12 hectares of vineyards belonging to Staffelter Hof. These are located in Paradies, Kirchlay, Letterlay, Steffensberg, and lastly Dhron Hofberger located in Neumagen-Dhron, which was added to the estate from Gundi's family after her marriage to Gerd. All 10 hectares were converted to organic viticulture during 2011–2014 and the property achieved organic certification in 2014.

=== Grape varieties ===
- White: 90% of total production
  - Riesling 75% of the harvest
  - Rivaner (formerly known as Müller Thurgau) 11%
  - Sauvignon blanc 3% (planted 2010)
  - Gelber Muskateller 1% (planted 2012)
- Red: 10% of total production
  - Pinot noir 45%
  - Regent 30%
  - Frühburgunder 15%

=== Wines ===
Staffelter Hof produces three tiers of wine, the Wappenwein – Heraldic Wines, Signatureweine – Signature Wines, Motivweine – Wolf Wines. These wines span dry to sweet, sparkling (including hand remuaged traditional method Sekt), rose, white and red.

== See also ==
- List of oldest companies
