= Beurre noisette =

Sauce used in French cuisine

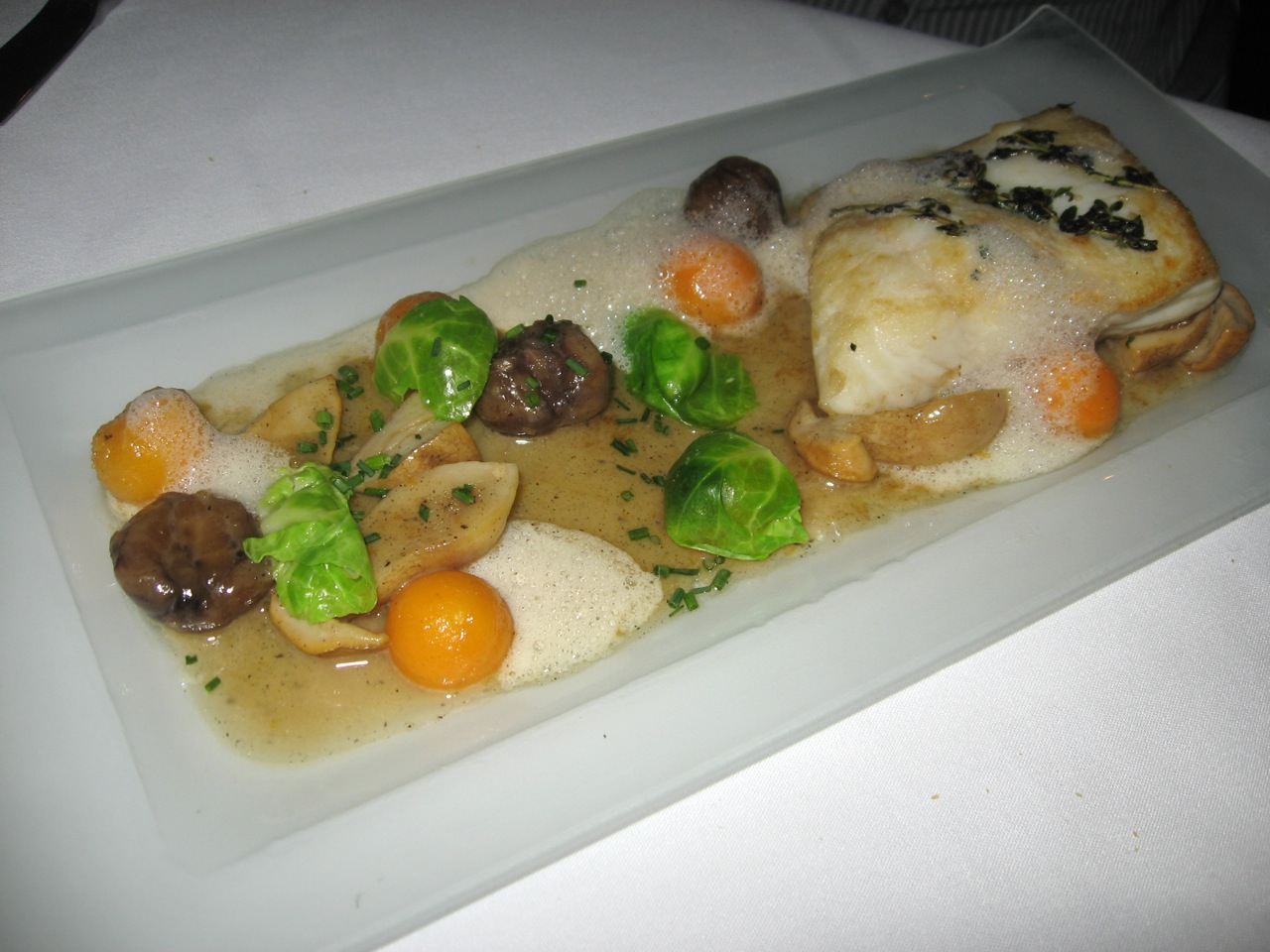
- Pan-roasted halibut and vegetables sauced with a beurre noisette sauce that has settled to the bottom of the serving dish
- Type: Sauce
- Place of origin: France
- Main ingredients: Butter

Beurre noisette (French pronunciation: [bœʁ nwazɛt], literally: hazelnut butter, loosely: brown butter) is a type of warm sauce used in French cuisine. It can accompany savoury foods, such as winter vegetables, pasta, fish, omelettes, and chicken. It has become a popular ingredient in other cultures as well, such as in contemporary American cuisine or the traditional American chocolate chip cookie. It is widely used in making French pastry. It has a deep yellow, almost brown, colour and a nutty scent and flavour from the heating process.

== Preparation ==
When unsalted butter is melted over low heat and allowed to separate into butterfat and milk solids, the latter naturally sink to the bottom of the pan and, if left warming over gentle heat, will begin to cook slightly and turn a deep brown color. As they reach a toasty hazelnut colour, the pan is removed from the heat. The result is called beurre noisette, or brown butter.

Beurre noisette may be used in its liquid state as a flavorful addition to many foods or cooled into a solid form. It has a nutty flavour and is particularly included in the batters for madeleines and financiers.

If beurre noisette is not mixed after preparation, but separated into the firm (protein) and liquid (fat) components, the latter is the type of clarified butter known as ghee in South Asia and samna in the Middle East countries.

== See also ==
- Beurre noir, "black butter", a similar sauce cooked longer
- Beurre monté
- Niter kibbeh, a type of clarified butter cooked with spices in Ethiopian cuisine
- Schmaltz, clarified chicken or goose fat
