= Le Loroux-Bottereau =

Le Loroux-Bottereau Le Lorór-Boterèu (Gallo) Lavreer-Botorel (Breton)
- Commune
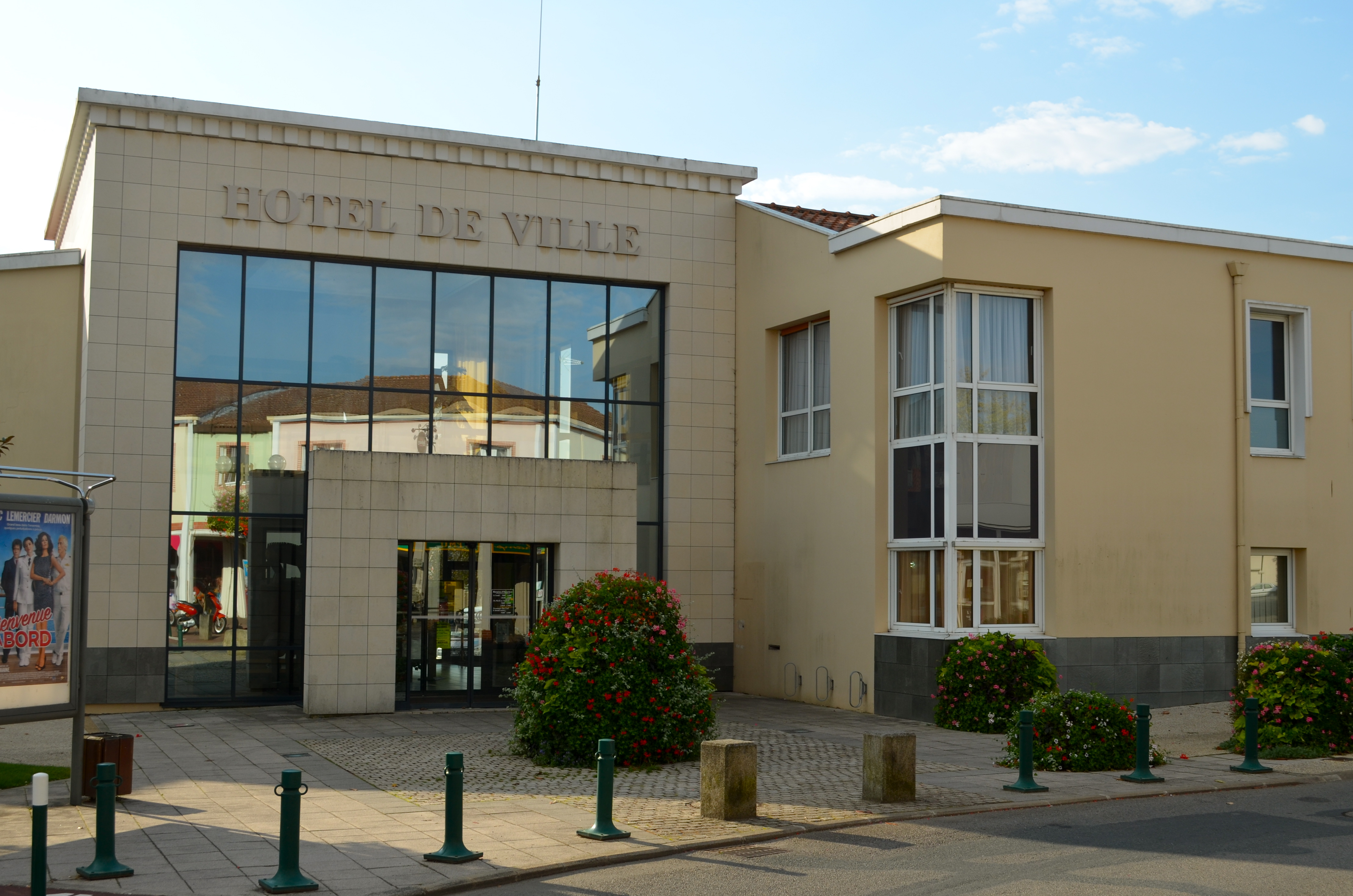
- Town hall

- Coat of arms
- Location of Le Loroux-Bottereau
- Location within France Location within Pays de la Loire
- Coordinates: 47°14′20″N 1°20′52″W
- Country: France
- Region: Pays de la Loire
- Department: Loire-Atlantique
- Arrondissement: Nantes
- Canton: Vallet
- Intercommunality: Sèvre et Loire

Government
  - Mayor (2020–2026): Emmanuel Rivery
- Area^{1}: 45.31 km^{2} (17.49 sq mi)
- Highest elevation: 93 m (305 ft)
- Lowest elevation: 2 m (6.6 ft)
- Population (2023): 8,552
  - Density: 188.7/km^{2} (488.8/sq mi)
- Time zone: UTC+01:00 (CET)
  - Summer (DST): UTC+02:00 (CEST)
- INSEE/Postal code: 44084 /44430
- ^{1} French Land Register data, which excludes lakes, ponds, glaciers > 1 km^{2} (0.386 sq mi or 247 acres) and river estuaries.

Le Loroux-Bottereau (French pronunciation: [lə lɔʁu bɔtʁo]; Gallo: Le Lorór-Boterèu, Breton: Lavreer-Botorel) is a commune in the Loire-Atlantique department in western France.

== Population ==
Historical population

Year	Pop.	±% p.a.
1793	7,200	—
1800	2,996	−11.77%
1806	4,971	+8.81%
1821	4,991	+0.03%
1831	4,991	+0.00%
1841	5,012	+0.04%
1846	5,681	+2.54%
1851	5,932	+0.87%
1856	6,058	+0.42%
1861	6,163	+0.34%
1866	4,195	−7.40%
1872	4,067	−0.52%
1876	4,105	+0.23%
1881	4,007	−0.48%
1886	4,029	+0.11%
1891	3,809	−1.12%
1896	3,666	−0.76%
1901	3,572	−0.52%

Year	Pop.	±% p.a.
1906	3,573	+0.01%
1911	3,476	−0.55%
1921	3,110	−1.11%
1926	3,135	+0.16%
1931	3,052	−0.54%
1936	3,069	+0.11%
1946	2,986	−0.27%
1954	3,024	+0.16%
1962	3,067	+0.18%
1968	3,204	+0.73%
1975	3,488	+1.22%
1982	4,033	+2.10%
1990	4,353	+0.96%
1999	4,939	+1.41%
2007	6,177	+2.84%
2012	7,609	+4.26%
2017	8,227	+1.57%
2023	8,552	+0.65%

Source: EHESS and INSEE (1968-2023)

== See also ==
- Communes of the Loire-Atlantique department
- Jean Fréour, sculptor
