= Landrieu family =

The family name Landrieu (/ˈlændruː/ LAN-drew) is a prominent name in the politics of the state of Louisiana, and may refer to:

- Moon Landrieu (1930-2022), former mayor of New Orleans, United States Secretary of Housing and Urban Development, and Louisiana judge
  - Mary Landrieu (born 1955), daughter of Moon Landrieu and former United States Senator from Louisiana, state treasurer, and state legislator
  - Mitch Landrieu (born 1960), son of Moon Landrieu and Senior Advisor to the President for Infrastructure Coordination, former mayor of New Orleans, lieutenant governor, and state legislator
  - Madeleine Landrieu, daughter of Moon Landrieu and former Louisiana judge.

== History ==
The family is of French, German, Italian, and African descent, including ancestors from Alsace and Prussia. Before moving to Louisiana the Landrieu family lived in Mississippi in the 1800s. Moon's wife is Sicilian American. For this reason, their daughter Mary Landrieu has been repeatedly highlighted by the Order of the Sons of Italy in America

The Landrieu family had sometimes faced claims that the family has partial Black heritage. Mitch Landrieu eventually addressed these claims in 2020, confirming the reports:

To suggest that you can care about the rights and plight of Black Americans only if you are Black or have Black blood is insidious. And it is rooted in racism. The question says more about the people who ask the question than those who would have to answer. The truth is I do have Black ancestry on my father's side of the family. My great, great grandmother was an African American who was enslaved in Mississippi.

== Government Offices held ==
- Moon Landrieu: Louisiana State Representative 1960-1966, Mayor of New Orleans 1970-1978, United States Secretary of Housing and Urban Development.
  - Mary Landrieu: Louisiana House of Representatives 1980-1988, Treasurer of Louisiana 1988-1996, United States Senator from Louisiana 1997-2015.
  - Mitch Landrieu: Louisiana House of Representatives 1988-2004, Lieutenant Governor of Louisiana 2004-2010, Mayor of New Orleans 2010-2018, Senior Advisor to the President for Infrastructure Coordination 2021–present.
