= Canton of Vallet =

Coordinates: 47.16°N 1.27°W

The canton of Vallet is an administrative division of the Loire-Atlantique department, western France. Its borders were modified at the French canton reorganisation which came into effect in March 2015. Its seat is in Vallet.

It consists of the following communes:

1. La Boissière-du-Doré
2. La Chapelle-Heulin
3. Divatte-sur-Loire
4. Le Landreau
5. Le Loroux-Bottereau
6. Mouzillon
7. Le Pallet
8. La Regrippière
9. La Remaudière
10. Saint-Julien-de-Concelles
11. Vallet
