= Le Landreau =

Le Landreau Le Landraud (Gallo) Lannerell (Breton)
- Commune
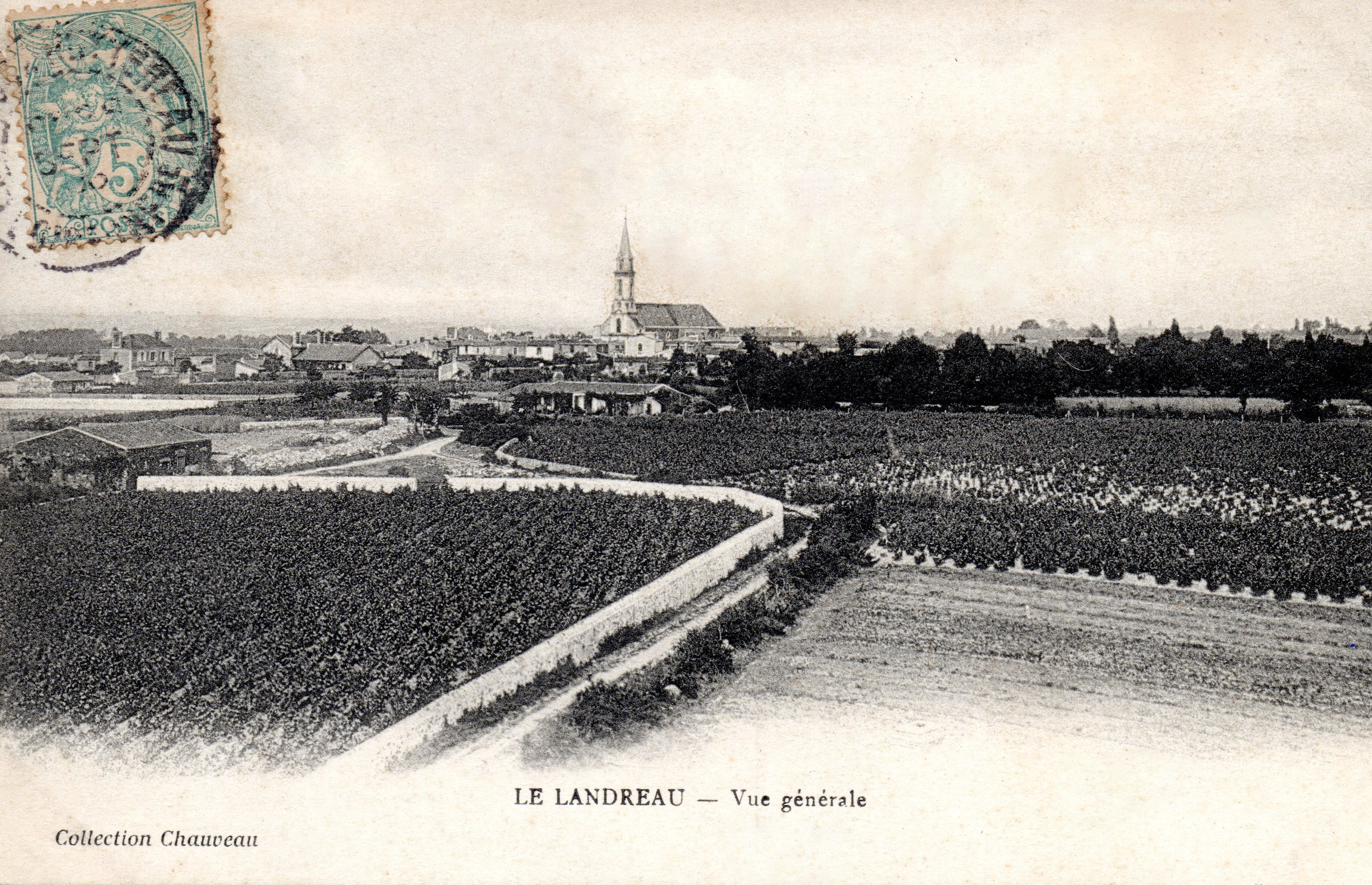
- Le Landreau in 1910

- Coat of arms
- Location of Le Landreau
- Location within France Location within Pays de la Loire
- Coordinates: 47°12′20″N 1°18′15″W
- Country: France
- Region: Pays de la Loire
- Department: Loire-Atlantique
- Arrondissement: Nantes
- Canton: Vallet
- Intercommunality: Sèvre et Loire

Government
  - Mayor (2020–2026): Christophe Richard
- Area^{1}: 23.98 km^{2} (9.26 sq mi)
- Highest elevation: 96 m (315 ft)
- Lowest elevation: 3 m (9.8 ft)
- Population (2023): 3,267
  - Density: 136.2/km^{2} (352.9/sq mi)
- Time zone: UTC+01:00 (CET)
  - Summer (DST): UTC+02:00 (CEST)
- INSEE/Postal code: 44079 /44430
- ^{1} French Land Register data, which excludes lakes, ponds, glaciers > 1 km^{2} (0.386 sq mi or 247 acres) and river estuaries.

Le Landreau (French pronunciation: [lə lɑ̃dʁo]; Gallo: Le Landraud, Breton: Lannerell) is a commune in the Loire-Atlantique department in western France.

== Population ==
Historical population

| Year | Pop. | ±% p.a. |
|---|---|---|
| 1872 | 2,025 | — |
| 1901 | 1,839 | −0.33% |
| 1926 | 1,444 | −0.96% |
| 1946 | 1,374 | −0.25% |
| 1962 | 1,368 | −0.03% |
| 1968 | 1,354 | −0.17% |
| 1975 | 1,386 | +0.33% |

| Year | Pop. | ±% p.a. |
|---|---|---|
| 1982 | 1,851 | +4.22% |
| 1990 | 2,026 | +1.14% |
| 1999 | 2,140 | +0.61% |
| 2007 | 2,766 | +3.26% |
| 2012 | 2,883 | +0.83% |
| 2017 | 2,995 | +0.77% |
| 2023 | 3,267 | +1.46% |

Source: EHESS and INSEE (1968-2023)

== See also ==
- Communes of the Loire-Atlantique department
