= Saint-Julien-de-Concelles =

- Commune
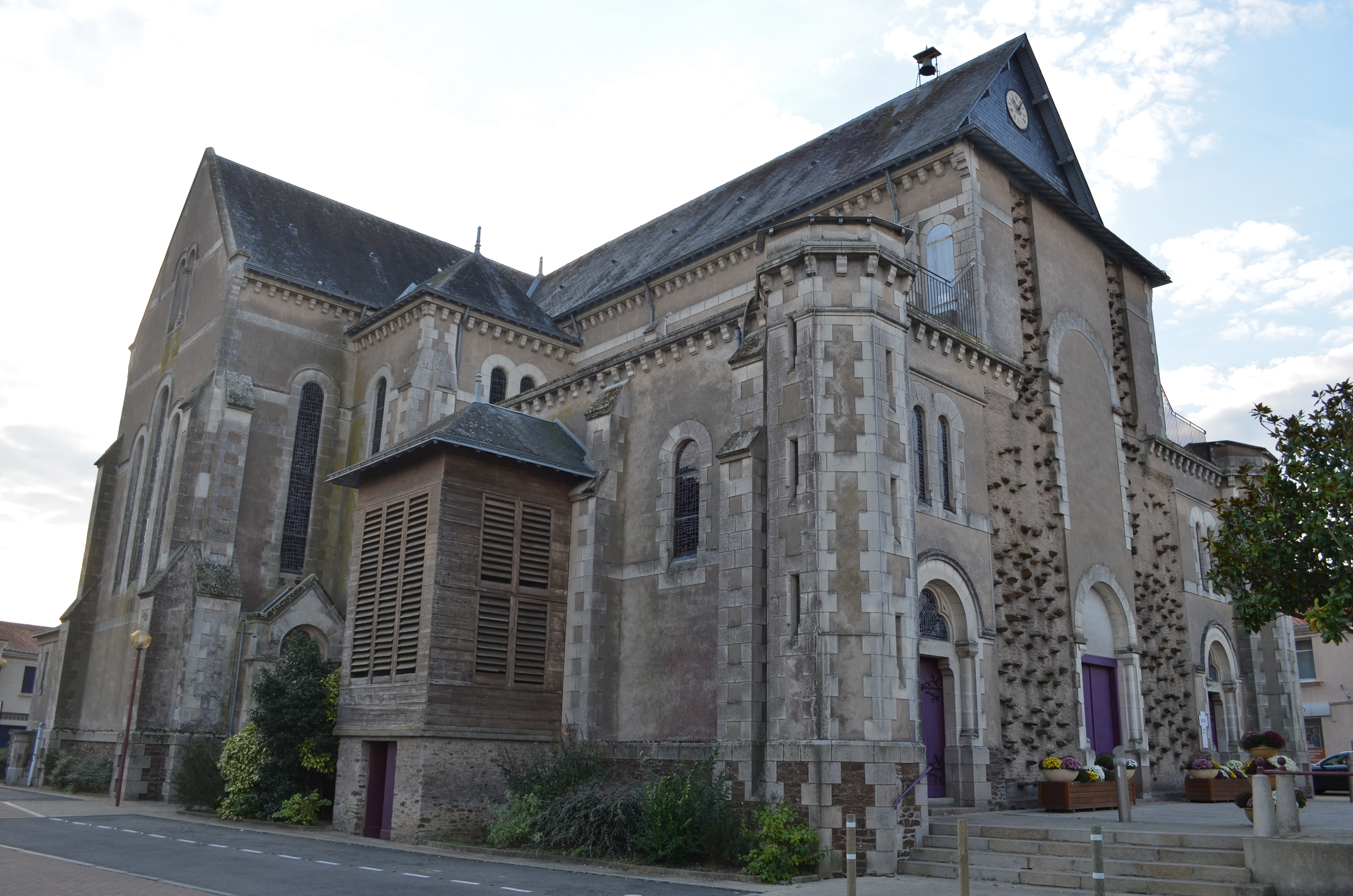
- The church of Saint-Julien, in Saint-Julien-de-Concelles

- Coat of arms
- Location of Saint-Julien-de-Concelles
- Location within France Location within Pays de la Loire
- Coordinates: 47°15′15″N 1°23′04″W
- Country: France
- Region: Pays de la Loire
- Department: Loire-Atlantique
- Arrondissement: Nantes
- Canton: Vallet
- Intercommunality: Sèvre et Loire

Government
  - Mayor (2020–2026): Thierry Agasse
- Area^{1}: 31.74 km^{2} (12.25 sq mi)
- Elevation: 24 m (79 ft)
- Highest elevation: 53 m (174 ft)
- Lowest elevation: 0 m (0 ft)
- Population (2023): 7,883
  - Density: 248.4/km^{2} (643.3/sq mi)
- Time zone: UTC+01:00 (CET)
  - Summer (DST): UTC+02:00 (CEST)
- INSEE/Postal code: 44169 /44450
- Website: Official website
- ^{1} French Land Register data, which excludes lakes, ponds, glaciers > 1 km^{2} (0.386 sq mi or 247 acres) and river estuaries.

Saint-Julien-de-Concelles (French pronunciation: [sɛ̃ ʒyljɛ̃ də kɔ̃sɛl]; Breton: Sant-Juluan-Kankell) is a commune in the Loire-Atlantique department in western France.

Saint-Julien-de-Concelles is the home of the popular beurre blanc sauce. The sauce was first prepared in a small restaurant on the banks of the river Loire. The town is also one of France's main growers of the mâche (lambs lettuce). Its flat and sandy land is suited to growing vegetables, such as leeks, and some flowers. Saint-Julien-de-Concelles also grows the grapes on its hills that produce local Muscadet wine.

A large lake, known as the Plan d'Eau du Chêne, is located near to the center of Saint-Julien-de-Concelles. The lake supports sailing, fishing, various sports and attracts walkers and nature lovers.

== Population ==
Historical population
Year	Pop.	±% p.a.
1968	3,850	—
1975	4,272	+1.50%
1982	5,095	+2.55%
1990	5,418	+0.77%
1999	6,260	+1.62%
2007	6,756	+0.96%
2012	6,782	+0.08%
2017	6,917	+0.39%
2023	7,883	+2.20%
Source: INSEE

== Gallery ==
Saint-Barthelémy chapel

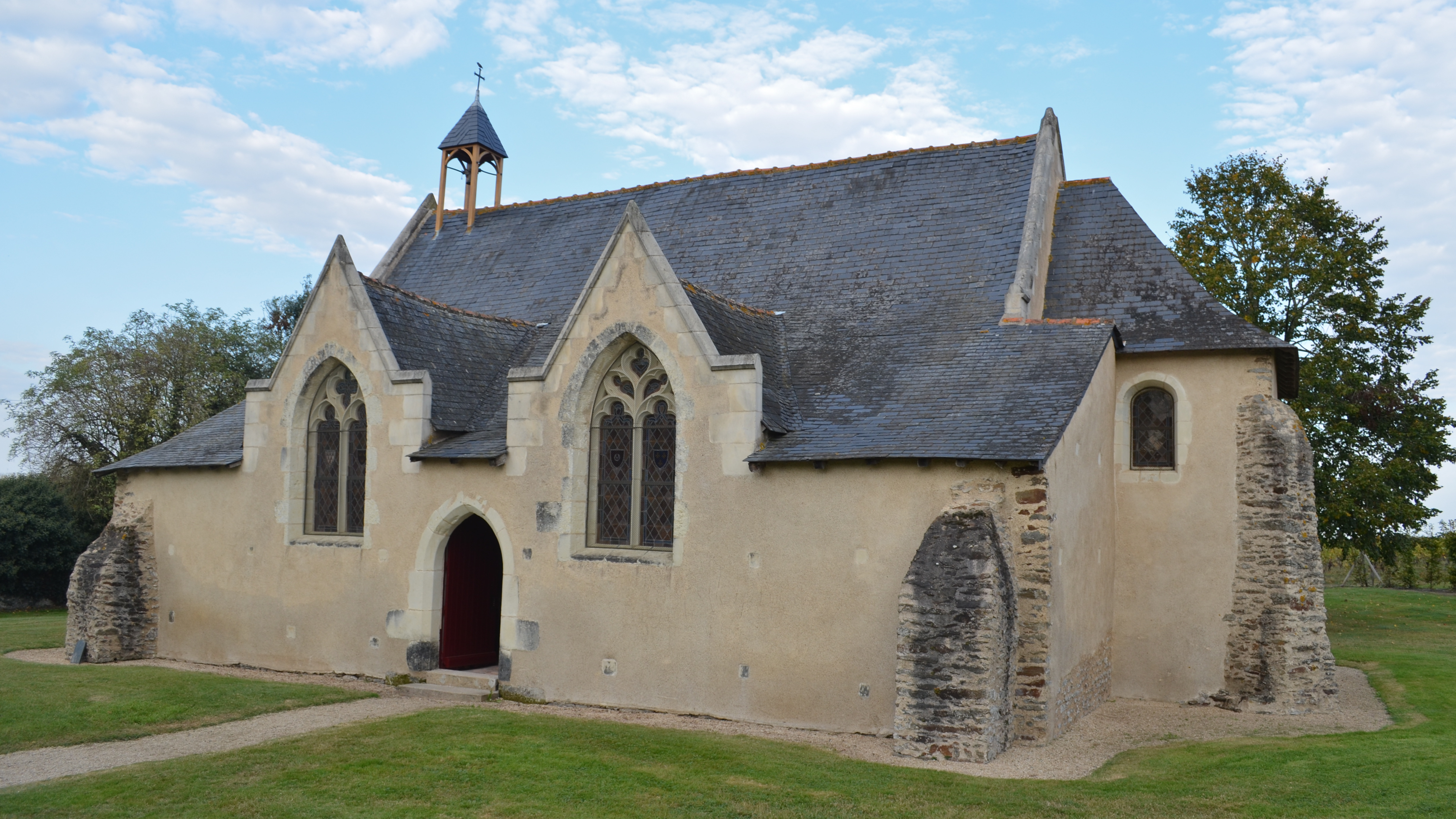

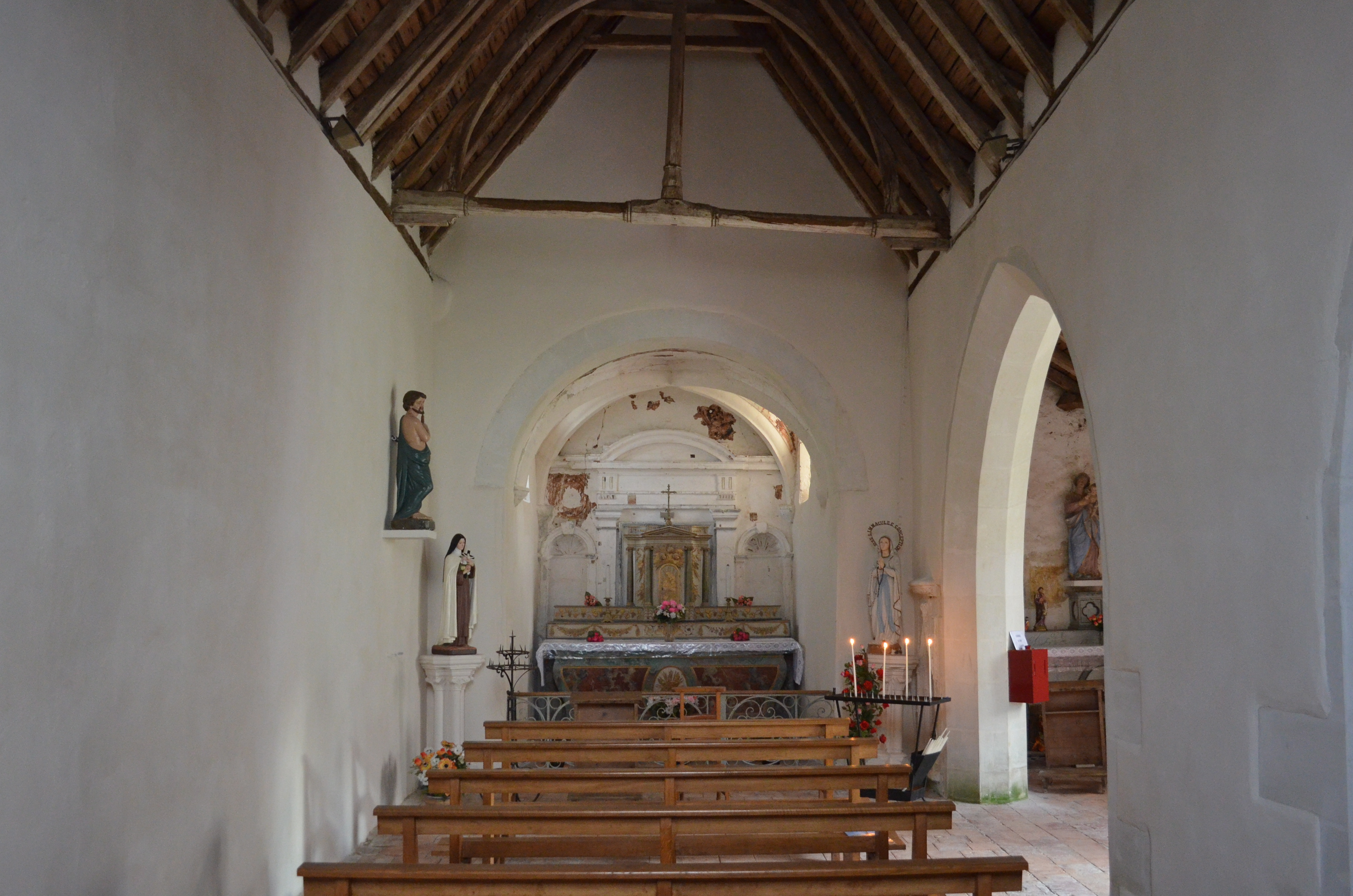
Choir

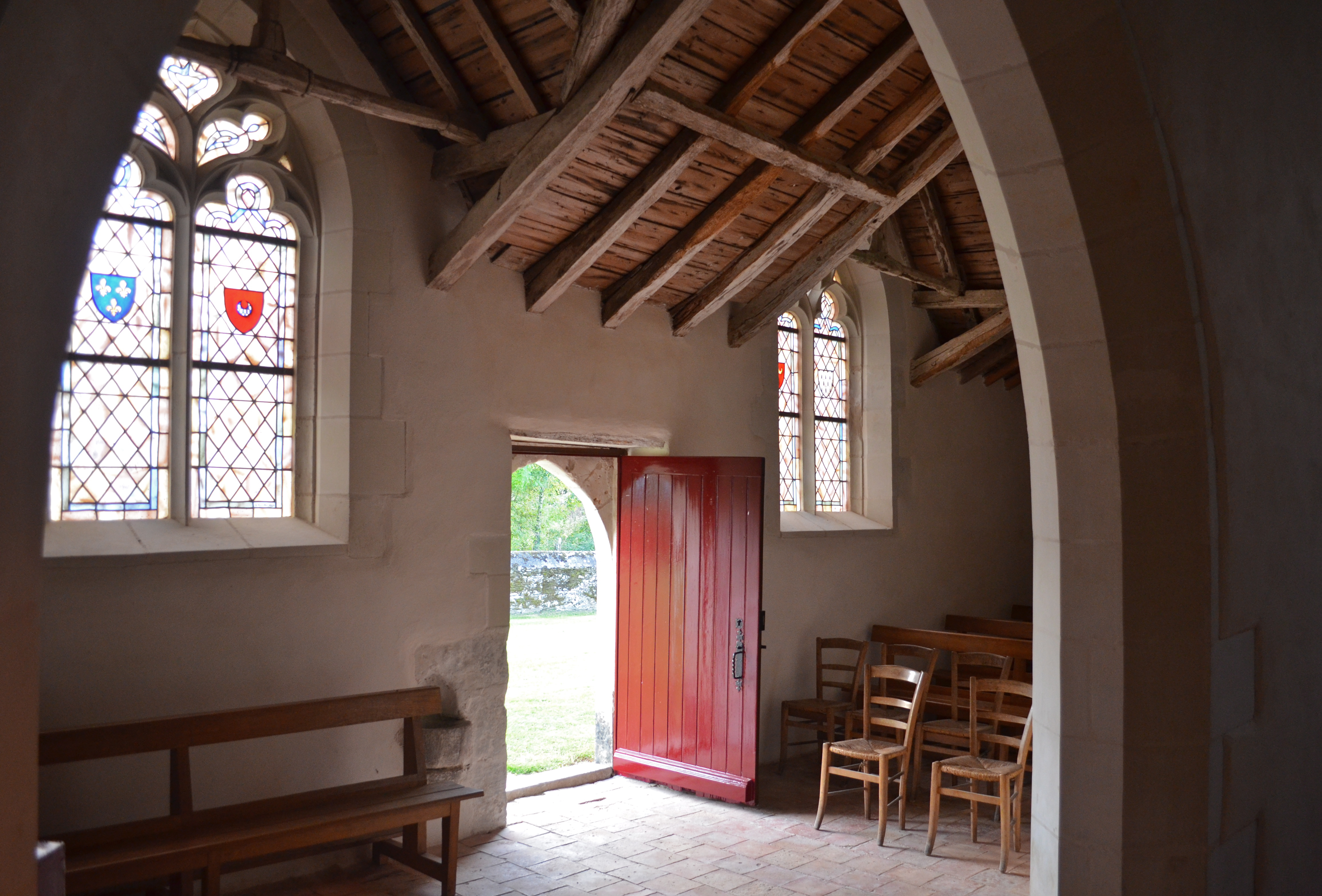
Transept

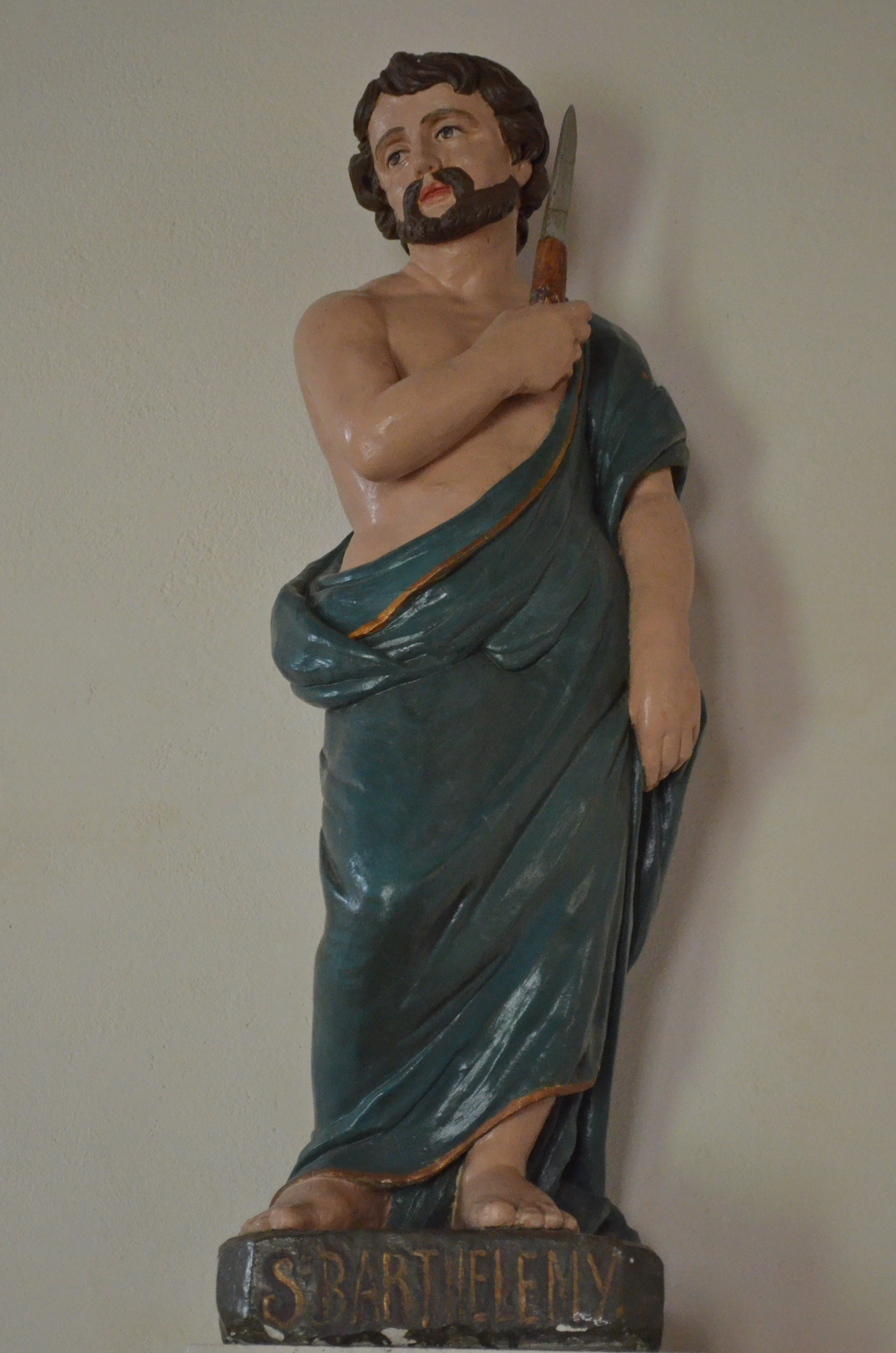
Saint-Barthelémy statue in the chapel

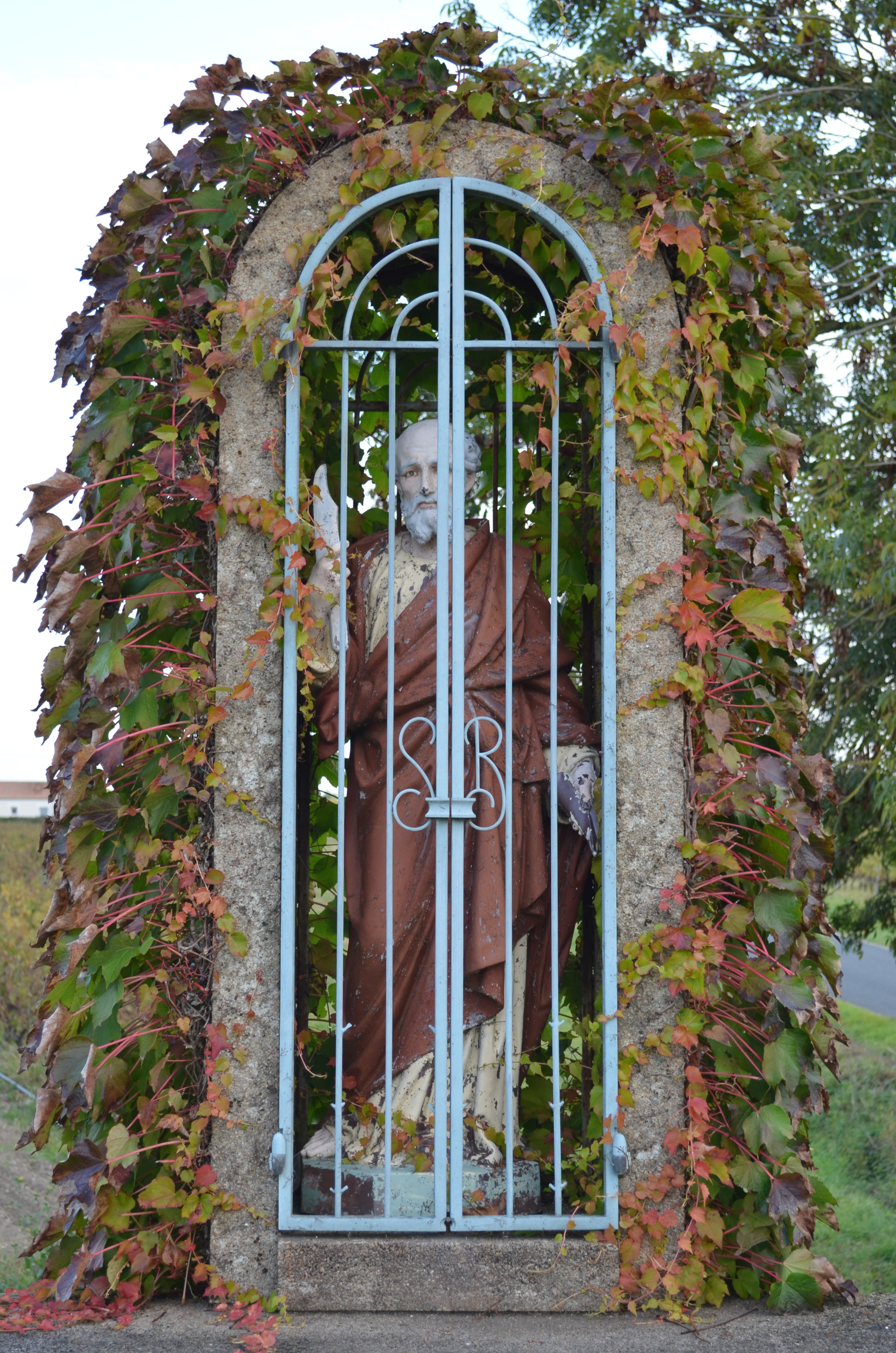
Saint-Barthelémy statue near the chapel

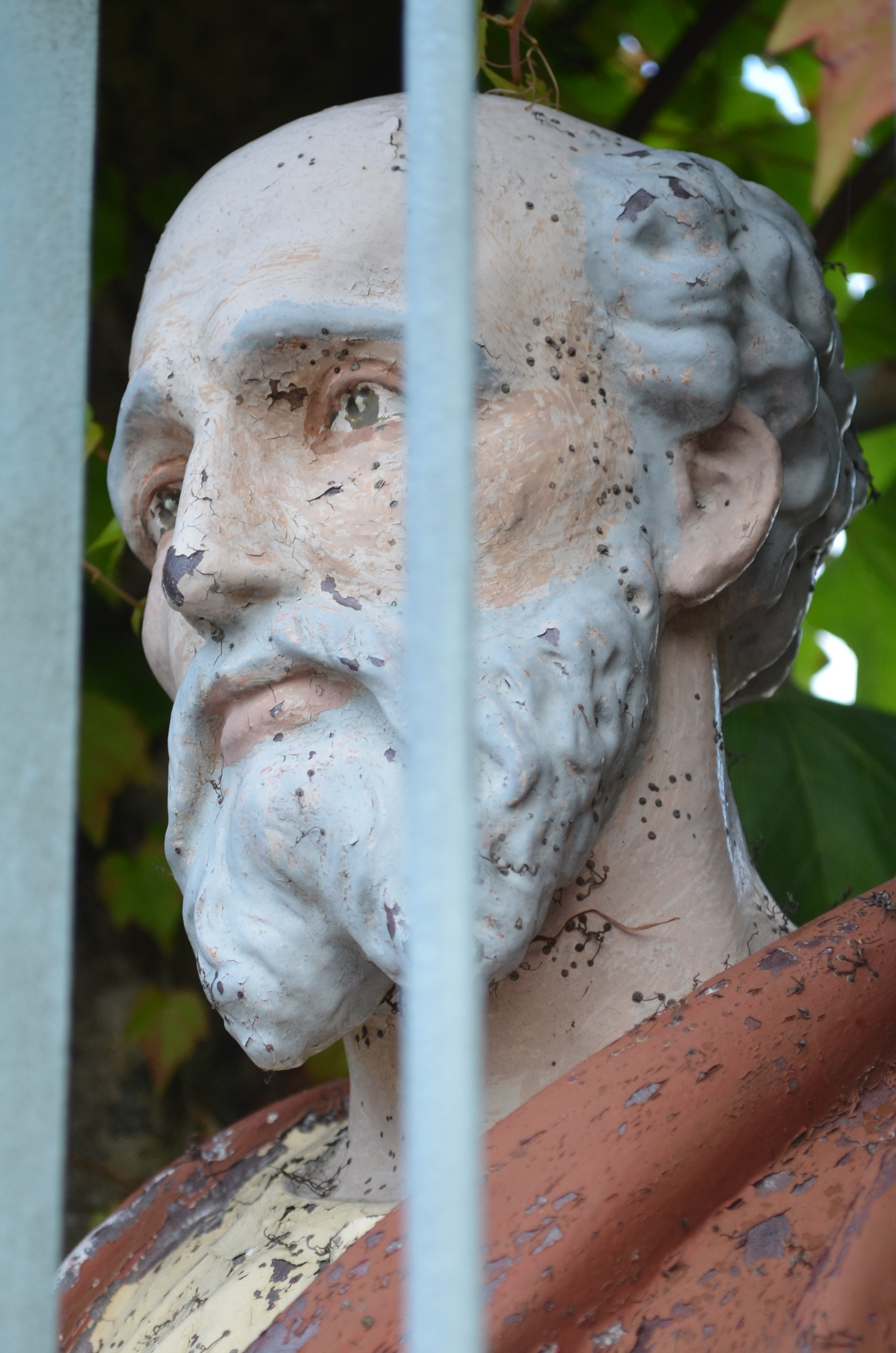
Statue detail

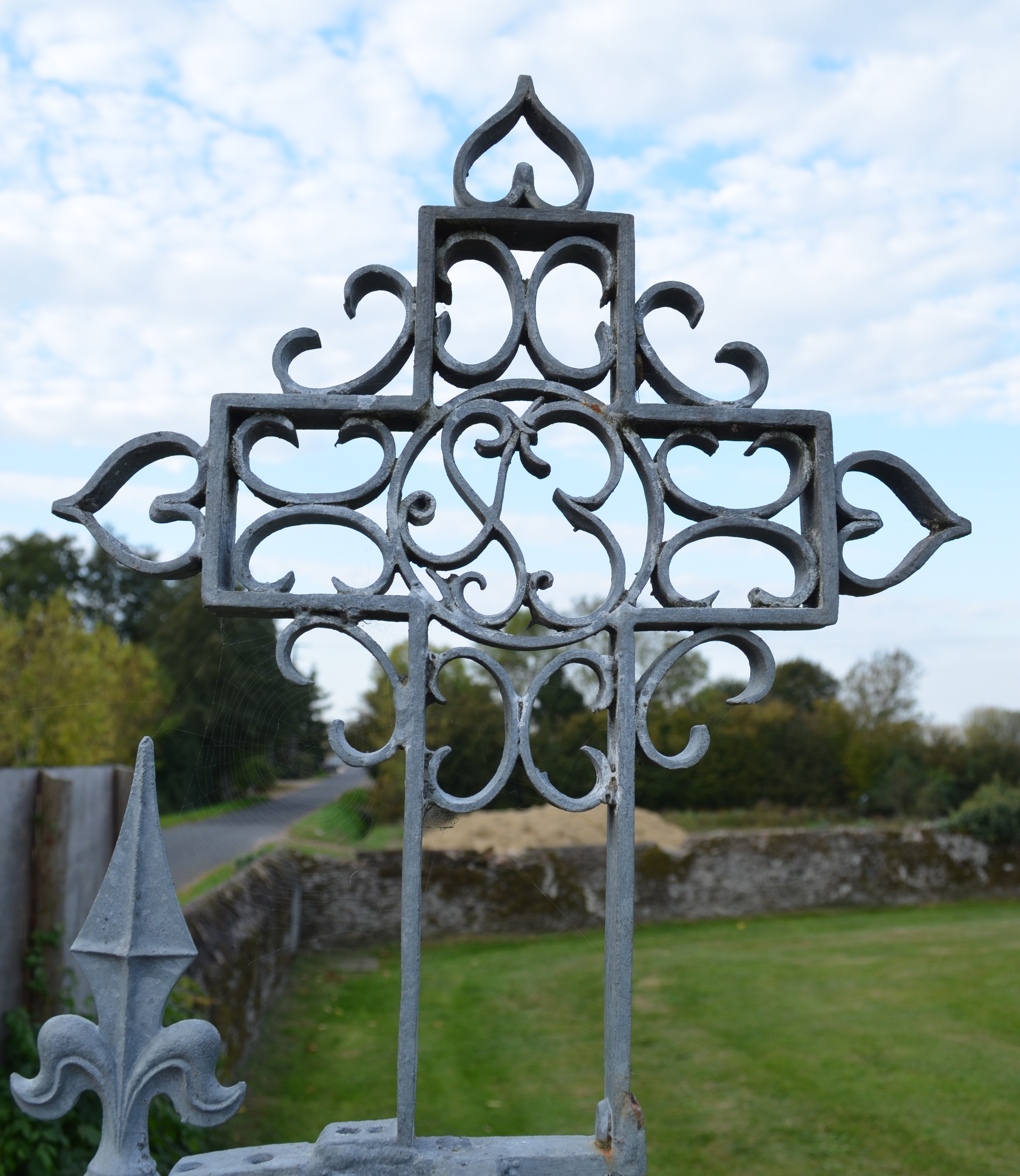
Portal

== See also ==
- Communes of the Loire-Atlantique department
