= Departmental Council of Loire-Atlantique =

Departmental legislature in France

Departmental Council of Loire-Atlantique Conseil départemental de la Loire-Atlantique
- Flag of the Council

Leadership
- President: Michel Ménard, PS since 1 July 2021

Website
- www.loire-atlantique.fr

The Departmental Council of Loire-Atlantique (French: Conseil départemental de la Loire-Atlantique, Breton: Kuzul-departamant Liger-Atlantel), called the 'General Council of Loire-Inférieure' between 1800 and 1957, then 'General Council of Loire-Atlantique' until 2015, is the deliberative assembly of the French department of Loire-Atlantique. Its headquarters are in Nantes.

== Executive ==
=== The President ===
The president of the Loire-Atlantique departmental council has been Michel Ménard (PS) since July 1, 2021.

=== The vice-presidents ===
The president of the departmental council is assisted by 15 vice-presidents chosen from among the departmental councillors. Each of them has a delegation of authority.

List of vice presidents of the departmental council of Loire-Atlantique (since 2021)
Order	Name	Canton (constituency)	Delegation
1st	Claire Tramer	Blain	Families and child protection
2nd	Jean Charrier	Machecoul-Saint-Même	Solidarity and territorial cohesion
3rd	Chloé Girardot-Moitié	Nantes-7	Resources, natural environments, biodiversity and land action
4th	Jérôme Alemany	Nantes-4	Local social action, integration and the fight against exclusion
5th	Lyliane Jean	Nantes-5	Age policy and solidarity between generations
6th	Freddy Hervochon	Rezé-1	Mobilities
7th	Ombeline Accarion	Nantes-2	People with disabilities, and autonomy
8th	Vincent Danis	Nantes-1	Education and educational policy
9th	Lydie Mahé	Saint-Nazaire-1	Human resources, social dialogue and quality of the departmental public service
10th	Ali Rebouh	Nantes-5	Finances, budget, public order and ecological transition of buildings
11th	Danielle Cornet	Pontchâteau	Youth and citizenship, equality, popular education, Breton issues
12th	Jean-Luc Séchet	Saint-Nazaire-2	Agriculture, sea and coast, waterways and ports
13th	Dominique Poirout	Rezé-2	Culture and heritage
14th	Rémy Orhon	Saint-Nazaire-2	Local economic development, social and solidarity economy, tourism
15th	Louise Pahun	Nantes-4	Solidarity, responsible sports and outdoor activities

== Composition ==
The Loire-Atlantique departmental council includes 62 departmental councilors from each of the 31 cantons of Loire-Atlantique.

Composition (by party)
Party	Acronym	Seats
Majority (40 seats)
Miscellaneous left	DVG	16
Union of the Left and the Ecologists	UGE	8
Socialist Party	PS	6
Union of the Left	UG	6
Divers	DIV	4
Opposition (22 seats)
Miscellaneous right	DVD	8
Union of the Right	UD	8
Union of the Right and Centre	UDC	4
Union of Democrats and Independents	UDI	2

== The delegations ==
The departmental council has decentralized part of its services within six territorial delegations. These bring together services dedicated to solidarity, planning and local development.

- Delegation of Nantes, located at 26 Boulevard Victor Hugo, Nantes, it covers the territory of the Nantes Metropolis.
- Delegation of Saint-Nazaire, located at 12, place Pierre-Semard in Saint-Nazaire and 90 rue Maurice Sambron in Pontchâteau.
- Delegation of Pays de Retz, located at 10-12, rue du Docteur-Guilmin in Pornic and 6, rue Galilée in Machecoul.
- Delegation of Châteaubriant, located at 10, rue d'Ancenis in Châteaubriant and at 29, route de Nantes in Nozay.
- Delegation of Vignoble, located at 2, cours des Marches-de-Bretagne in Clisson.
- Delegation of Ancenis, located at 118, place du Maréchal-Foch in Ancenis.

== Headquarters ==
The Hôtel de Département, adjoining the Hôtel de Préfecture de la Loire-Atlantique, located on the Quai Ceineray, is partly made up of two private mansions, the Hôtel Mellient and the Hôtel Urvoy de Saint-Bedan, dating from the 18th century and the first half of the 19th century.

The department's administrative services building, less than 100 meters from the department hall, dates from 2011, and was built on the site of Nantes' first power plant (1891), whose new building preserved three stone portals of the facade.

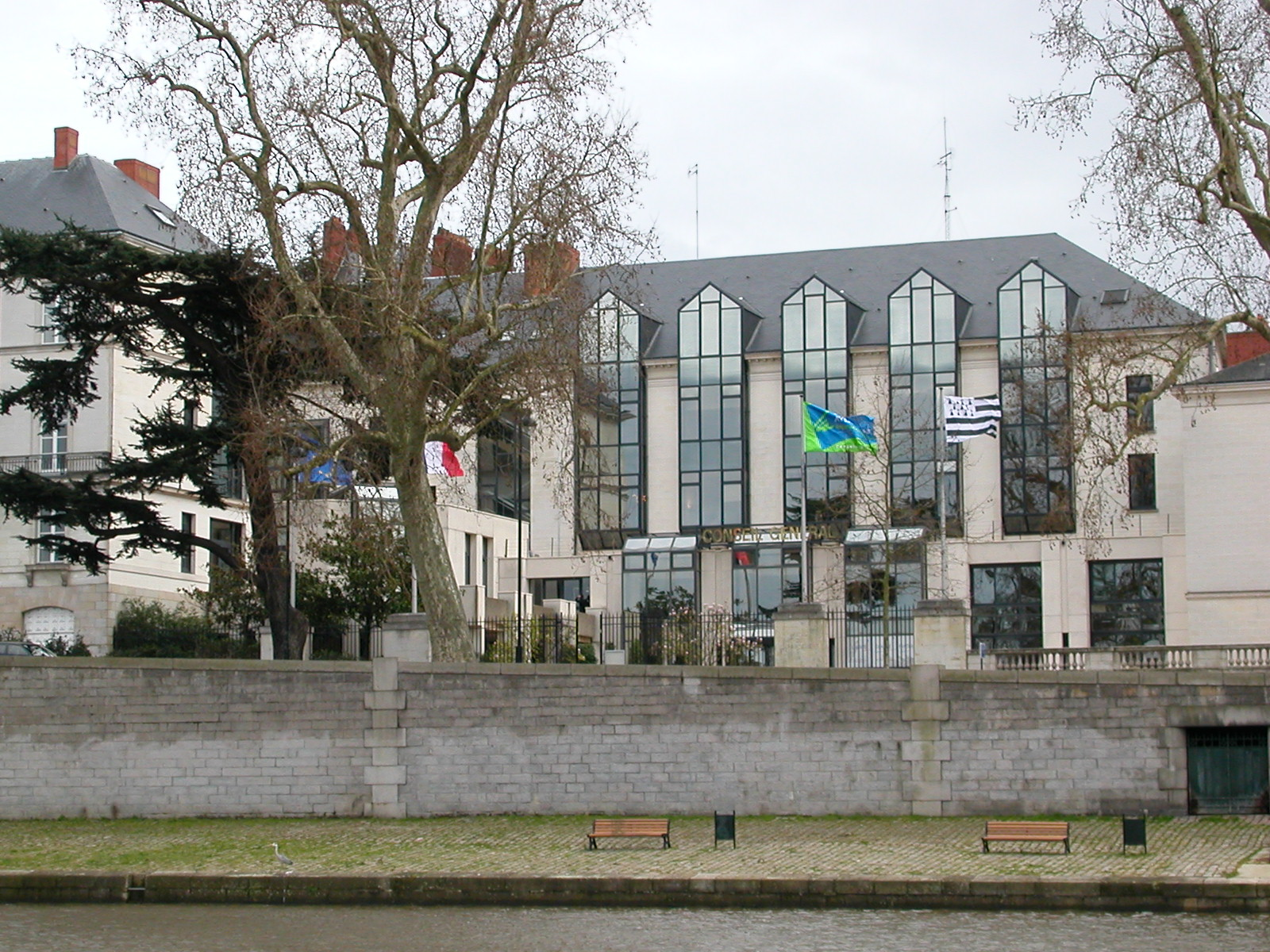
The hôtel de département, Quai Ceineray in Nantes.
