= Cantons of the Loire-Atlantique department =

The following is a list of the 31 cantons of the Loire-Atlantique department, in France, following the French canton reorganisation which came into effect in March 2015:

- Ancenis-Saint-Géréon
- La Baule-Escoublac
- Blain
- Carquefou
- La Chapelle-sur-Erdre
- Châteaubriant
- Clisson
- Guémené-Penfao
- Guérande
- Machecoul-Saint-Même
- Nantes-1
- Nantes-2
- Nantes-3
- Nantes-4
- Nantes-5
- Nantes-6
- Nantes-7
- Nort-sur-Erdre
- Pontchâteau
- Pornic
- Rezé-1
- Rezé-2
- Saint-Brevin-les-Pins
- Saint-Herblain-1
- Saint-Herblain-2
- Saint-Nazaire-1
- Saint-Nazaire-2
- Saint-Philbert-de-Grand-Lieu
- Saint-Sébastien-sur-Loire
- Vallet
- Vertou
