= Bridoux =

Bridoux is a French surname. Notable people with the surname include:

- Eugène Bridoux (1888–1955), French general
- François-Augustin Bridoux (1813–1892), French engraver
- Léonce Bridoux (1852–1890), French Roman Catholic bishop
