= Château de Bois-Briand =

Château in Nantes, France

Coordinates: 47°14′56″N 1°29′44″W

- Château du Bois Briant (Bright Wood Castle)
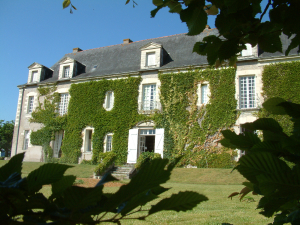
- Interactive map of the Château de Bois-Briand area
- Former names: chateau du Bois Briand
- Alternative names: ChateauBoisBriand

General information
- Architectural style: medieval, (classical) 17th century
- Location: Nantes, France, 10 rue du Bois Briand, Nantes, France
- Current tenants: Delalonde family
- Construction started: 1405
- Completed: 1699
- Opened: 1405
- Inaugurated: 1405
- Renovated: 1699, 1771
- Owner: Eric & Mijo Delalonde

Height
- Architectural: medieval, XVII

Other information
- Parking: yes

Château de Bois-Briand is a château located in Nantes, France. In 2008, the estate was listed as a "Monument National" by French Minister of Culture. This label was attributed thanks to three main considerations: the inspiring history of some landlords, the permanence of a consensual social life and the translation of this harmony into various gardens, buildings and botanical creations.

The original castle was named Bois-Briant, Bois-Brient and Bois-Brillant. These names referred to a wood enlightened by sun because it was (still is) facing South. The medieval castle became a "château" when it was sold by the Charette family to Le Meneust des Treilles family, in 1699. The medieval defensive "castle" transformed itself into a "maison de plaisance" where pleasure was associated with economic productions (wine and dry fruits for sailors). Such "châteaux", designed for pleasure were named "Folies" in "Pays de Nantes". In other parts of France, the term "Folies" was used mainly to designate monumental ornaments in 18th century parks: false ruins (pyramids, obelisks), grottos, love-temples, friendship-temples and "laiteries". The street that led to the castle was named Avenue de Bois-Briant. Since its acquisition by the city of Nantes, Avenue du Bois-Briant became « rue du Bois-Briand ».

== 19th century - Bois-Briand and USA ==
At the beginning of the 19th century, Bois-Briand becomes a shelter for a family of planters from the West-Indies and Louisiana (Laure Gaigneron de Marolles was born in Elisabeth Town, New-Jersey, in 1801); Felix Cossin de Chourses, pirate (corsair) and slave trader buys Bois-Briand then transmit it to his daughter. His grandson marries American-born princess Murat. His granddaughter gives birth to one of the inventors of automobile (Marquis de Dion).

1803 - Felix Cossin, a merchant, is elected on the Board of City of Nantes

- Born in L’île Bouchard, Felix Cossin, a merchant, is elected to the Board of the City of Nantes.

As a pirate, Felix Cossin was famous for the capture, in 1792, (by his captains) of the Dutch brig « Dolphin » with « Les deux-Frères ». The boat was under the command of « Mylord Courtequeue » (= "Mylord short tail », a nickname he won because of his hair/poney tail). The same « Mylord » captured, in 1793, the British brig Caractacus, the British 3-masts « La Charlotte », the US brig « Junon », the huge British vessel « La Henriette that was staffed with 623 sailors. « Mylord Courtequeue » was adopted as his son by Felix Cossin de Chourses.

1815 - Felix Cossin de Chourses buys Chateau de Bois-Briand

- In 1815, Felix Cossin de Chourses buys Chateau de Maubreuil, in Carquefou, from Marquis de Maubreuil for 171 000 livres. This is (maybe) the year when he buys, also, Chateau de Bois-Briand whose owners (Le Meneust des Treilles) left for the West-Indies when the French Revolution occurred.

1816 - Felix Cossin deceases. Julie Cossin inherits Chateau de Bois-Briand

- In 1816, Felix Cossin deceases. He accumulated the most important fortune in Nantes region (including 10 « trade" vessels.

Some of his boats were very big: L’Oiseau, armed with big guns, was staffed with 100 sailors, La Confiance was a 3 mast vessel, Les Deux-Frères was staffed with 120 sailors and equipped with 22 guns. Boats names were quite romantic: « L’Eugénie », « La nouvelle Eugénie », « La félicité », « Les Deux-Frères », « La Celestine », « La Musette » (18 guns!), « Le Chéri », « La Confiance », « L’Oiseau »…

In 1816, Julie Cossin inherits Chateau de Bois-Briand, she is 17 years old. Her niece Clementine Cossin will give birth to the Marquis de Dion, in 1856.

1817 - Julie Cossin marries Alexandre, Charles, Gustave, Baron de Chassiron

- On 27 December 1817, Julie Cossin marries Alexandre, Charles, Gustave, Baron de Chassiron.

1818 - Julie de Chassiron-Cossin gives birth to Charles Gustave Martin On 5 December 1818, Julie Cossin gives birth to Charles Gustave Martin, Baron de Chassiron.

- 1820

On 25 August Julie de Chassiron-Cossin deceases. She is 21.

- 1848

Charles Gustave de Chassiron is a diplomat in Tunis. He publishes « Aperçu pittoresque de la Régence de Tunis ».

1850 - Charles Gustave de Chassiron marries Princess Caroline Laetitia Murat

- On 6 January 1850, Charles Gustave de Chassiron marries Princess Caroline Laetitia Murat, the daughter of Prince Lucien Joseph Murat, grand-daughter of Pauline Bonaparte and General Murat (« Roi de Naples ») and grand-niece of famous French emperor Napoleon.

Princess Caroline Laetitia Murat was born on 31 December 1833 in Bordentown (New-Jersey) to Prince Lucien Charles Joseph Murat and Caroline Georgine Fraser. Fraser ancestors were Nantes region landlords (from Anjou, more precisely) Their original name was « de la Frézelière". They joined the Normans to conquer England during Middle-Ages. « Frézelière » became « Frisel » then « Fraser ». During their honeymoon in Nantes, Charles-Gustave introduces his bride to his family. Then, he shows her Clisson, an artists paradise where Sculptor Lemot is building his famous Villa and its « Gardener’s house ». Caroline falls in love with romantic landscapes of Tiffauges and its castle. By that time, everyone had forgotten (and not yet recalled) the horrible crimes that had been accomplished there by ????, the famous tale's heroe « Bluebeard ».

1857 - Charles-Gustave de Chassiron is a diplomat in China, India and Japon

- Charles-Gustave de Chassiron is a diplomat in China, India and Japon.

In 1861, he publishes « Notes sur le Japon, la Chine et l’Inde ». A museum was built in La Rochelle to display artistic treasures brought back by Charles Gustave de Chassiron from Extreme-Orient.

== Place ==
Indeed, the original castel was built (on one side) on the mouth of the Aubinière river, where Aubinière meets with Loire river. Before the huge 16th century Loire river floods, ChateauBoisBriand was (also) located on the banks of the Loire river. Sea tides influence is noticeable on Loire river, there. The Vikings invaded Western Loire Region using Loire river. Since these floods, Loire river bed has been postpone 2 miles further thanks to dams (called "levées", locally). The Aubinière is the administrative frontier between Nantes and Sainte-Luce-sur-Loire. The château is located less than 500 meters from the church and the shops of near-by village Sainte-Luce-sur-Loire. Before 1908, ChateauBoisBriand estate was located in the city of Doulon, until it was annexed by the City of Nantes.
