= Mauves-sur-Loire =

Mauves-sur-Loire Mauv (Gallo) Malvid (Breton)
- Commune
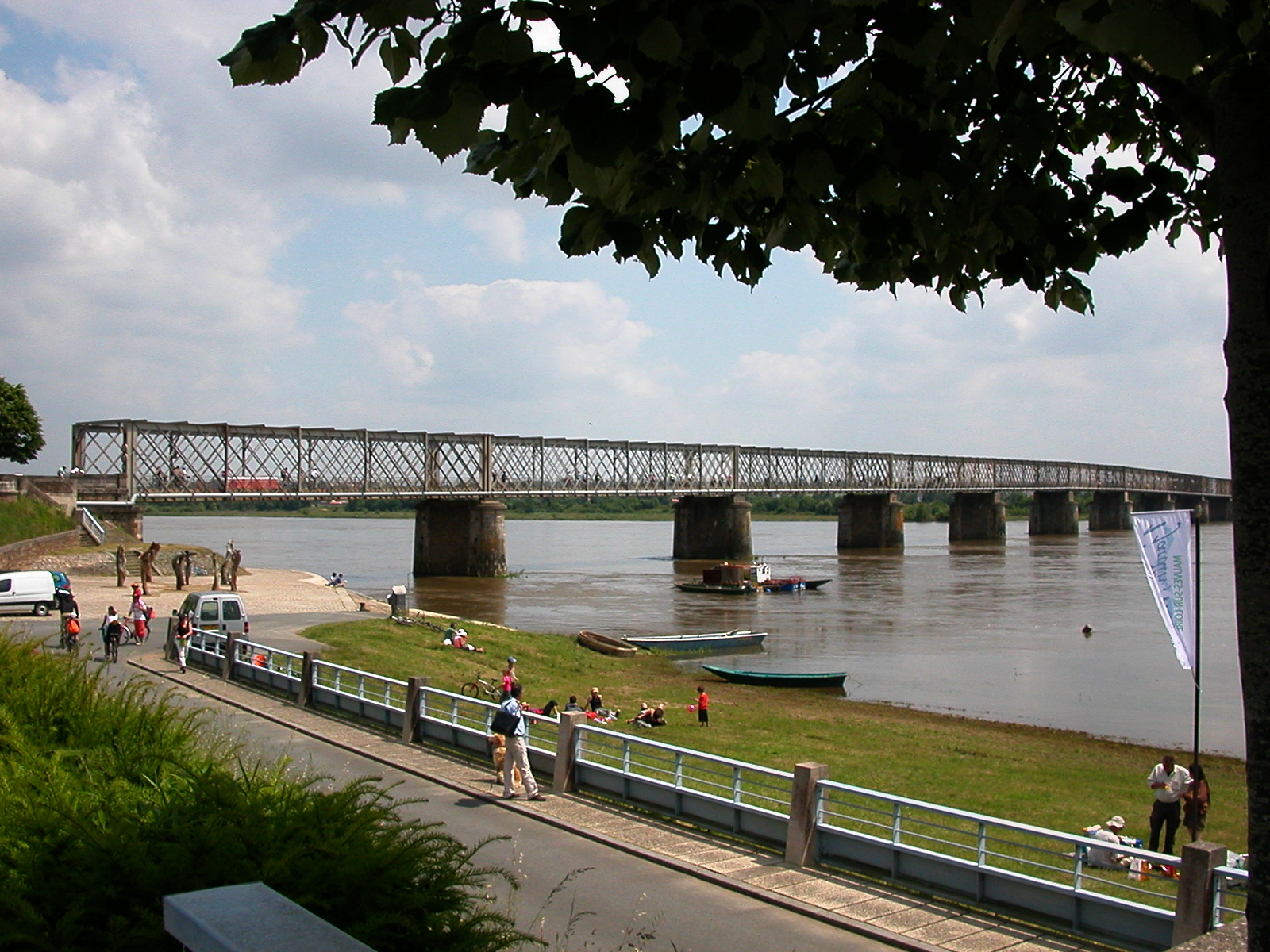
- Mauves Bridge seen from the north bank of the Loire

- Coat of arms
- Location of Mauves-sur-Loire
- Location within France Location within Pays de la Loire
- Coordinates: 47°17′49″N 1°23′32″W
- Country: France
- Region: Pays de la Loire
- Department: Loire-Atlantique
- Arrondissement: Nantes
- Canton: Carquefou
- Intercommunality: Nantes Métropole

Government
  - Mayor (2020–2026): Emmanuel Terrien
- Area^{1}: 14.75 km^{2} (5.70 sq mi)
- Highest elevation: 84 m (276 ft)
- Lowest elevation: 1 m (3.3 ft)
- Population (2023): 3,409
  - Density: 231.1/km^{2} (598.6/sq mi)
- Time zone: UTC+01:00 (CET)
  - Summer (DST): UTC+02:00 (CEST)
- INSEE/Postal code: 44094 /44470
- ^{1} French Land Register data, which excludes lakes, ponds, glaciers > 1 km^{2} (0.386 sq mi or 247 acres) and river estuaries.

Mauves-sur-Loire (French pronunciation: [mov syʁ lwaʁ], literally Mauves on Loire; Gallo: Mauv, Breton: Malvid) is a commune in the Loire-Atlantique department in western France.

== Population ==
Historical population

| Year | Pop. | ±% p.a. |
|---|---|---|
| 1793 | 766 | — |
| 1821 | 1,105 | +1.32% |
| 1846 | 1,476 | +1.16% |
| 1872 | 1,338 | −0.38% |
| 1901 | 1,369 | +0.08% |
| 1926 | 1,190 | −0.56% |
| 1946 | 1,303 | +0.45% |
| 1962 | 1,359 | +0.26% |
| 1968 | 1,403 | +0.53% |

| Year | Pop. | ±% p.a. |
|---|---|---|
| 1975 | 1,741 | +3.13% |
| 1982 | 2,139 | +2.98% |
| 1990 | 2,138 | −0.01% |
| 1999 | 2,407 | +1.33% |
| 2007 | 2,931 | +2.49% |
| 2012 | 3,106 | +1.17% |
| 2017 | 3,215 | +0.69% |
| 2023 | 3,409 | +0.98% |

Source: EHESS and INSEE (1968-2023)

== International relations ==
Mauves-sur-Loire is twinned with Hythe in England.

== See also ==
- Communes of the Loire-Atlantique department
