= Carquefou =

Carquefou Carqefou (Gallo) Kerc'hfaou (Breton)
- Commune
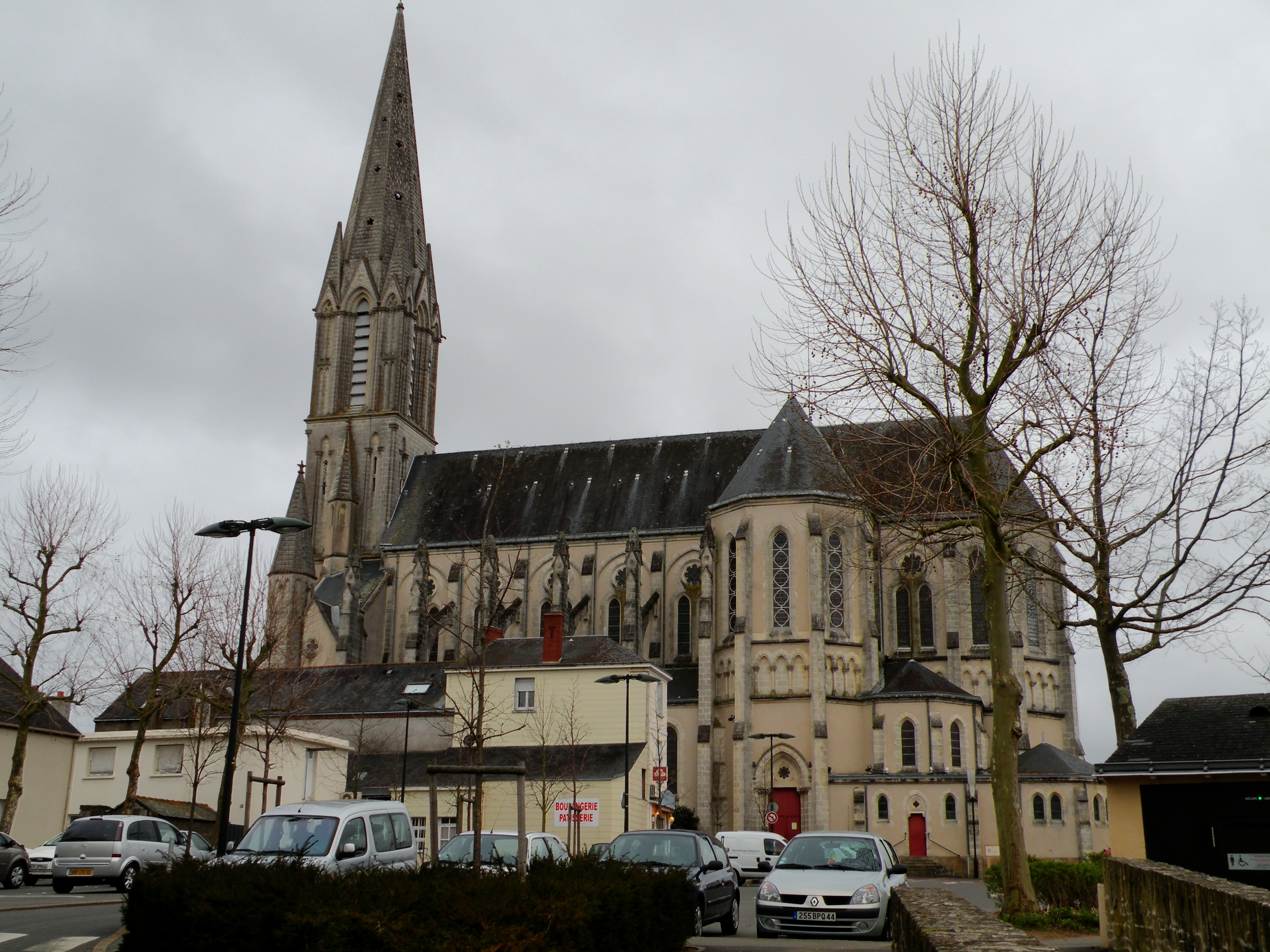

- Coat of arms
- Location of Carquefou
- Location within France Location within Pays de la Loire
- Coordinates: 47°17′51″N 1°29′29″W
- Country: France
- Region: Pays de la Loire
- Department: Loire-Atlantique
- Arrondissement: Nantes
- Canton: Carquefou
- Intercommunality: Nantes Métropole

Government
  - Mayor (2020–2026): Véronique Dubettier-Grenier
- Area^{1}: 43.42 km^{2} (16.76 sq mi)
- Highest elevation: 76 m (249 ft)
- Lowest elevation: 1 m (3.3 ft)
- Population (2023): 20,921
  - Density: 481.8/km^{2} (1,248/sq mi)
- Time zone: UTC+01:00 (CET)
  - Summer (DST): UTC+02:00 (CEST)
- INSEE/Postal code: 44026 /44470
- ^{1} French Land Register data, which excludes lakes, ponds, glaciers > 1 km^{2} (0.386 sq mi or 247 acres) and river estuaries.

Carquefou (French pronunciation: [kaʁkəfu]; Gallo: Carqefou, Breton: Kerc'hfaou) is a commune in the Loire-Atlantique, department in the region Pays de la Loire, in western France.

== History ==
The Hôtel de Ville

The Hôtel de Ville was completed in 1986.

== Population ==
Historical population

Year	Pop.	±% p.a.
1793	2,273	—
1800	1,259	−8.09%
1806	2,156	+9.38%
1821	2,379	+0.66%
1831	2,626	+0.99%
1841	2,690	+0.24%
1846	2,912	+1.60%
1851	2,899	−0.09%
1856	2,891	−0.06%
1861	2,810	−0.57%
1866	2,897	+0.61%
1872	2,799	−0.57%
1876	2,782	−0.15%
1881	2,932	+1.06%
1886	2,909	−0.16%
1891	2,902	−0.05%
1896	2,751	−1.06%
1901	2,670	−0.60%

Year	Pop.	±% p.a.
1906	2,843	+1.26%
1911	2,609	−1.70%
1921	2,586	−0.09%
1926	2,538	−0.37%
1931	2,472	−0.53%
1936	2,635	+1.29%
1946	3,026	+1.39%
1954	3,169	+0.58%
1962	3,287	+0.46%
1968	3,744	+2.19%
1975	6,239	+7.57%
1982	9,664	+6.45%
1990	12,877	+3.65%
1999	15,377	+1.99%
2007	17,956	+1.96%
2012	18,398	+0.49%
2017	19,805	+1.48%
2023	20,921	+0.92%

Source: EHESS and INSEE (1968-2023)

== Economy ==
The headquarters of the geophysical research company Sercel is located in Carquefou.

== Sport ==
In 2008, the local football team Union Sportive Jeanne d'Arc Carquefou reached the quarter-finals of the French Cup after a win over the 8-times national champions Olympique de Marseille on 19 March, putting the town in the national headlines.

== See also ==
- Communes of the Loire-Atlantique department
