= Communauté d'agglomération de la Région Nazairienne et de l'Estuaire =

Région Nazairienne et Estuaire
- Communauté d'agglomération
- Interactive map of Région Nazairienne et Estuaire
- Coordinates: 47°17′N 02°12′W
- Country: France
- Region: Pays de la Loire
- Department: Loire-Atlantique
- No. of communes: {{{nbcomm}}}
- Established: 2000
- Area: 320.3 km^{2} (123.7 sq mi)
- Population (2017): 124,487
  - Density: 388.7/km^{2} (1,007/sq mi)
- Website: www.agglo-carene.fr

Communauté d'agglomération de la Région Nazairienne et de l'Estuaire (CARENE) is an intercommunal structure, centred on the city of Saint-Nazaire. It is located in the Loire-Atlantique department, in the Pays de la Loire region, western France. It was created in December 2000. Its seat is in Saint-Nazaire. Its area is 320.3 km^{2}. Its population was 124,487 in 2017, of which 69,993 in Saint-Nazaire proper.

== Composition ==
The communauté d'agglomération consists of the following 10 communes:

1. Besné
2. La Chapelle-des-Marais
3. Donges
4. Montoir-de-Bretagne
5. Pornichet
6. Saint-André-des-Eaux
7. Saint-Joachim
8. Saint-Malo-de-Guersac
9. Saint-Nazaire
10. Trignac
