= Eugène Bridoux =

French general (1888–1955)

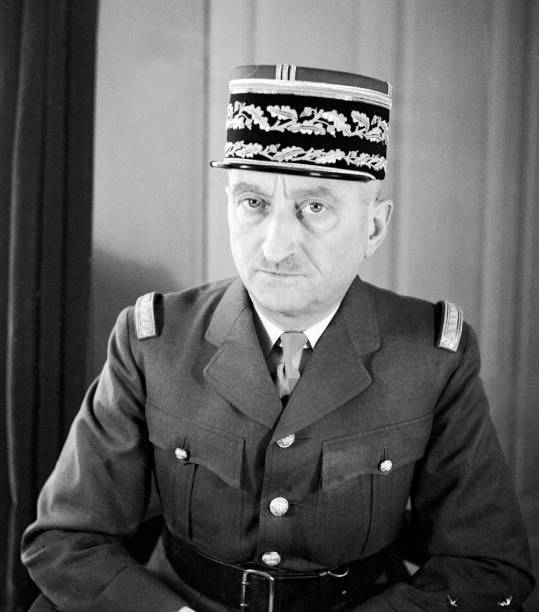
- Born: 24 June 1888; Doulon (now Nantes), Loire-Atlantique, France
- Died: 6 June 1955 (aged 66); Madrid, Spain
- Education: École spéciale militaire de Saint-Cyr
- Occupation: General

Eugène Bridoux (French: [øʒɛn bʁidu]; June 24, 1888 – 6 June 1955) was a French general. He served as Secretary of State for War, later Secretary of State for Defence, under Vichy France during World War II.

== Early life ==
Eugène Bridoux was born on 24 June 1888 in Doulon, now a suburb of Nantes, France. He graduated from the École spéciale militaire de Saint-Cyr.

== Career ==
Bridoux served as Secretary of State for War from 1942 to 1943, and as Secretary of State for Defence from 1943 to 1944, under Prime Minister Pierre Laval during Vichy France. He fled to the Sigmaringen enclave in 1944, and he was arrested by the United States Army in 1945. He was jailed at the Val-de-Grâce, but he escaped in 1947, settling in Francoist Spain. He was sentenced to death in absentia and dégradation nationale on 18 December 1948.

== Death ==
Bridoux died in 1955 in Madrid, Spain.
