= Doulon =

Ancient cities of France

Coordinates: 46°17′10″N 1°30′20″E

- Commune of France
- 1789–1908
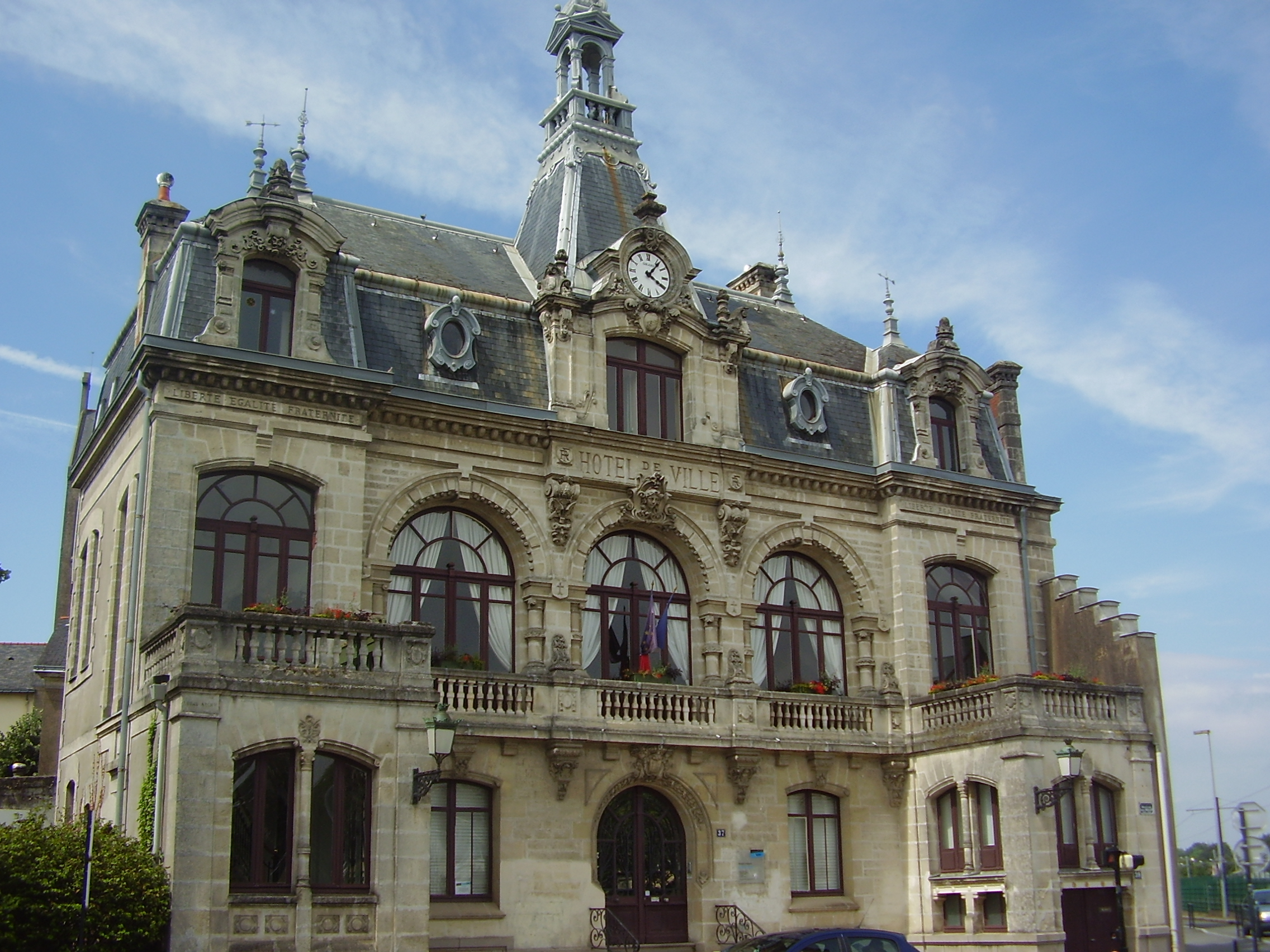
- Former town hall of Doulon, now an annex town hall of Nantes
- Population
  - 1906: 6,990
- History
  - Creation as commune: 1789
  - Annexed by Nantes: 1908
- Political subdivisions: Loire-Atlantique (formerly Loire-Inférieure)
Succeeded by
Nantes
- Today part of: Nantes, Loire-Atlantique, France

Doulon is a former commune in the Loire-Atlantique department (formerly Loire-Inférieure), bordering Nantes (to the east), which was annexed to the latter in 1908. Its territory largely corresponded to that of one of Nantes's 11 current districts, called Doulon-Bottière (part of which is now also part of Malakoff-Saint-Donatien).

== Boundaries ==
On the eve of its annexation in 1908, the territory of the former commune was roughly bounded:

- to the east, by the boundaries of the commune of Sainte-Luce-sur-Loire (marked in particular by the Aubinière stream);
- to the south, by the banks of the Loire;
- to the west, by the Pont de la Moutonnerie (including the present-day Malakoff-Pré Gauchet district);
- to the north, by the Boulevard Ernest-Dalby and the Route de Sainte-Luce (D68) as far as Place du Commandant-Cousteau, then by the Route de Paris from Haluchère to Aubinière.

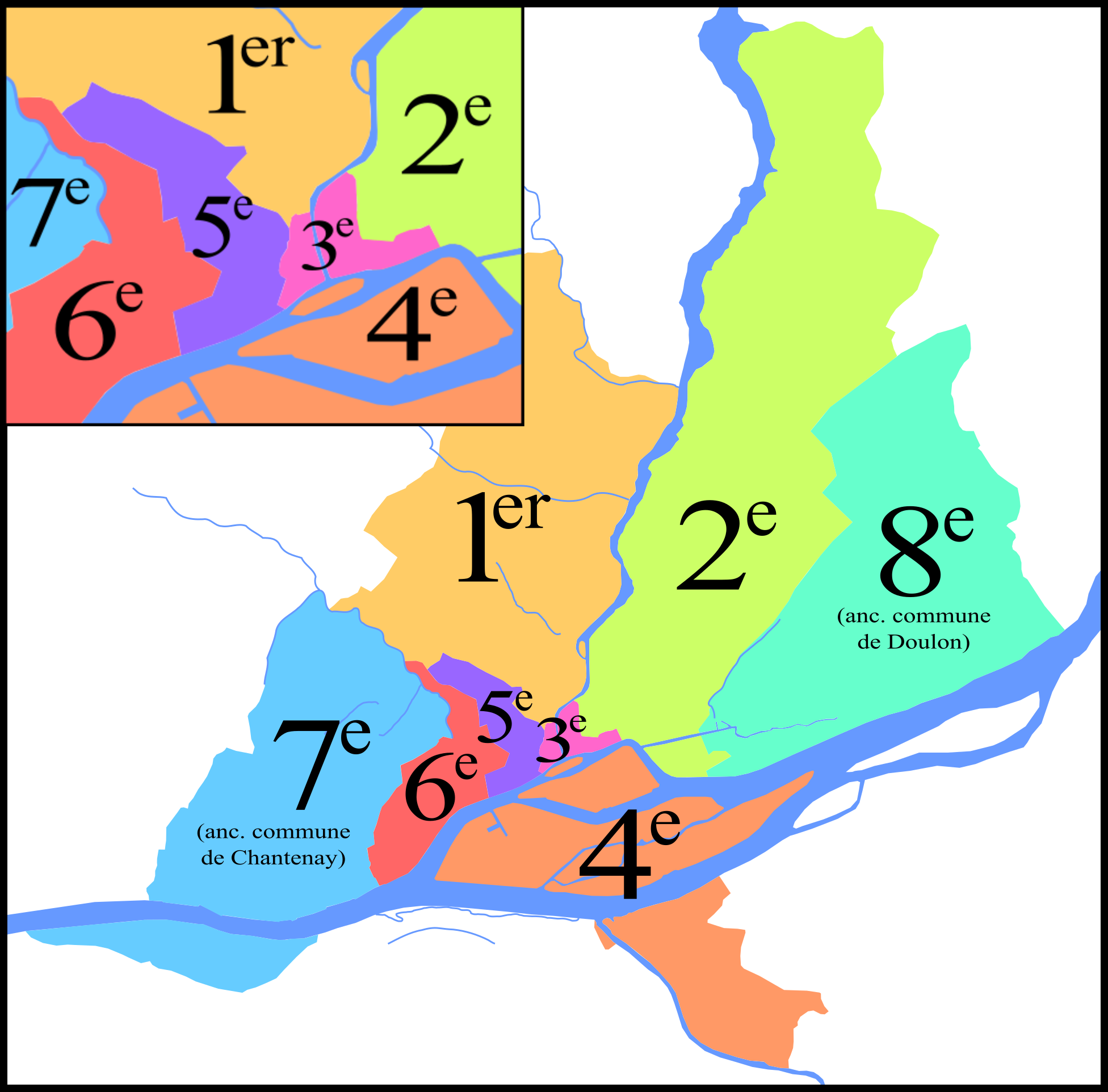
Map of the districts of Nantes in 1926, the former commune of Doulon corresponds to the 8th district.

== Toponymy ==
Most etymologists in the past traced the name “Doulon” back to the pre-Indo-European root Tull, meaning “height” or “elevation,” which was corrupted to give Dol. However, given the topology of the area, it would be more logical to see it as a derivative of the Celtic place name Dola, which refers to a meadow, valley, or any low-lying area prone to flooding (such as a marsh).

== History ==
=== Antiquity ===
Archaeological excavations carried out by Léon Maître in the early 20th century show that at the beginning of the Christian era, there was already a Gallo-Roman settlement on this site, located on a road leading from Nantes between the Loire River and the road to Angers.

=== Middle Ages ===
The Abbey of Saint-Médard of Doulon

Doulon first appeared in history during the reign of Charlemagne. In 786 or 787 he authorised the Abbey of Saint-Médard in Soissons to establish a monastery in this area, which was then part of the parish of Saint-Donatien in Nantes. A Benedictine abbey was therefore established, with the usual privileges. Its history is not well known, but it is mentioned in a bull issued by Pope Eugene II in 824, in a charter issued by King Odo in 893 (confirming its privileges), and in a charter issued by Duke Alan Barbetorte in 945: control over Doulon Abbey was then transferred to Landévennec Abbey.

The parish of Saint-Médard

Documentation only resumes at the end of the 11th century with a charter from Harscoët I of Saint-Pierre, Lord of Retz. At that time, he owned one-third of the abbey's tithes. It took the threat of excommunication, following the decisions of the Council of Rome in 1049, for Harscouët to return Doulon to Bishop Benoît de Cornouaille in 1104.

During the second half of the 11th century, Constance of Normandy, Duchess of Brittany, owned the manor of Petit-Blottereau (next to that of Grand-Blottereau) in Doulon, since, according to legend, she was responsible for the foundation of a chapel dedicated to the Virgin Mary called "Notre-Dame de Toutes-Aides" (Our Lady of All help), following a vow she made and which was fulfilled.

However, the chapter of Nantes Cathedral, being unable to manage its possessions, ceded them under pressure from the Duke of Brittany to wealthy families. Seigneuries were thus created, such as those of Grand-Blottereau, Petit-Blottereau, la Papotière, Bois-Briand, les Perrines-Chamballan, and La Colinière.

=== Early modern period ===
The parish of Doulon was divided into two distinct sections: "Haut Doulon" (Upper Doulon) and "Bas Doulon" (Lower Doulon):

- Haut Doulon included the villages and farms of L’Aubinière, Bois-Brillant (or Boisbriant), La Grenouillère, La Haluchère, La Papotière, La Ragotière, L’Écusson, Le Chambellan, and La Clarière.
- Bas Doulon included the castle of La Colinière, La Bonnetière, Les Blottereaux, Les Perrines, Le Gué-Robert, Toutes-Aides, and Le Pont-Mitry.

=== Contemporary period ===
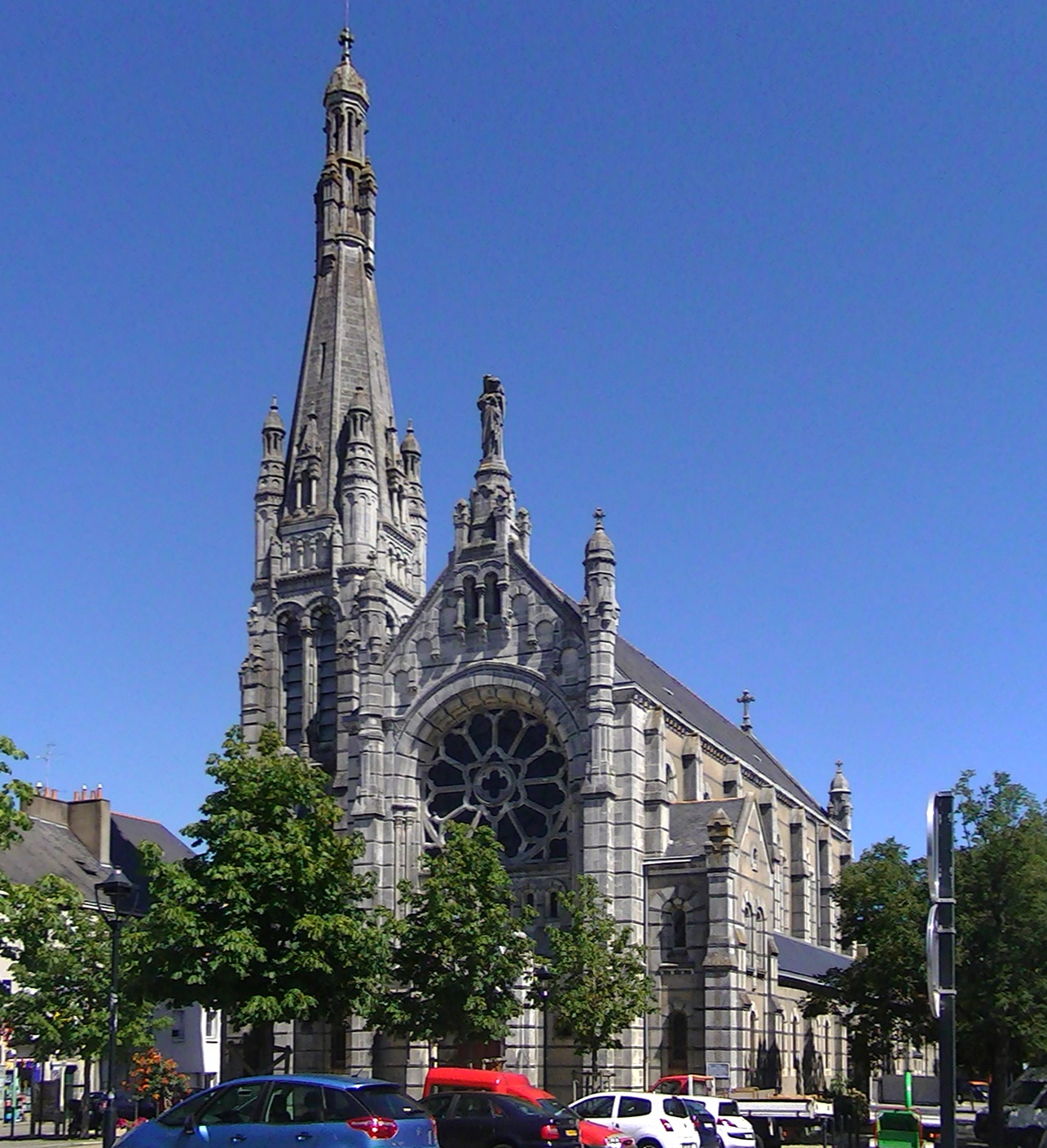
Notre-Dame-de-Toutes-Aides Church.

The parish of Saint-Médard became the commune of Doulon during the administrative reform of France at the beginning the Revolution.

In the 19th century, it benefited from the economic development of Nantes, notably with the creation of the Grand-Blottereau marshalling yard and the establishment of the Brissonneau et Lotz factory in Rue Bellier, which specialized in the construction of railway equipment (the site is currently occupied by the main tram depot and the headquarters of Semitan).

It experienced demographic growth, particularly in the districts bordering Nantes, which benefited from their proximity to the tobacco factory and the Gare d’Orléans train station. In 1873, a new parish, "Notre-Dame de Toutes-Aides", was created, and a new church was built starting in 1878 next to the 17th-century chapel, under the direction of architect François Bougoüin. The inauguration took place in 1881.

The two parishes were inhabited by very different, often antagonistic populations:

- "Toutes-Aides" with its workers and railroaders;
- "Vieux-Doulon" with its farmers, mainly market gardeners.

This social situation sometimes fuels a certain rivalry between parish clubs and secular or workers' associations (particularly in sports). In 1887, a petition from the inhabitants of Vieux Doulon even called for the division of the commune into two electoral sections intended to become independent, but the Prefecture rejected their request two years later.

In the minds of the people of Douillon, only Toutes-Aides would sooner or later be brought together with its Nantes neighbor. Ultimately, the entire commune was annexed in 1908, along with Chantenay to the west of Nantes. The annexation of the two communes was prepared during the term of Nantes mayor Paul-Émile Sarradin and decided by a law passed on April 3, 1908. The municipalities of Nantes, Doulon, and Chantenay were then dissolved and replaced by a municipal commission headed by Joseph Canal (from April 4 to May 17), until the election of the new unified municipality headed by Gabriel Guist'hau.

Doulon, like Chantenay, retained a specific administrative status within the city of Nantes through the presence of a branch town hall and the appointment of a “special deputy.” Since the 2008 municipal elections, no special deputy has been appointed.

=== Politics and administration ===
The first mayor, Jean-Baptiste Lainé, elected in February 1790, was the parish priest. Having refused to swear allegiance to the Civil Constitution of the Clergy, voted by the Constituent Assembly on July 12 of the same year, he was ordered by the authorities to leave the commune. From then on, for a year, the people of Doulon appear to have had no declared mayor.

List of successive mayors

Period	Name	Label	Quality
(1790–1791)	Jean-Baptiste Lainé		
(1791–1792)	No mayor declared		
(1792-1792)	Pierre Millet		
(1792–1795)	Julien Peignon		
(1795–1800)	Jean Vrait		Municipal officer of the township
(1800-1800)	Jean Vrait		Major of the commune
(1800–1804)	Mathieu Dupé		
(1804–1807)	Pierre Moriceau		
(1807–1815)	Jean-Augustin Sioc'han de Kersabiec		
(1815–1816)	Pierre Chevalier		
(1816–1820)	Jean-Marie Le Lubois		
(1820–1824)	Jean-Augustin Sioc'han de Kersabiec		
(1824–1826)	Félix de Soussay		
(1827–1833)	Elie de la Barre		
(1833–1859)	Jean-Baptiste Minatte		
(1859–1870)	Jacques Lambert		
(1870–1871)	François Süe		
(1871–1880)	Jean Cottin de Melleville		
(1880–1892)	Joseph Doury		
(1892–1893)	Leuduger Fortmorel		
(1893–1908)	Louis Millet		
(April 1908- May 1908)	Joseph Canal		Chair of the Special Delegation
(1971–1977)	Gabriel Thomas	PS	

== Demographic evolution (1793–1906) ==
Population trends

1793	1800	1806	1821	1831	1841	1846
1319	1203	1339	1401	1415	1523	1463

1851	1856	1861	1866	1872	1876	1881
1548	1612	1740	2669	2997	3304	4094

1886	1891	1896	1901	1906	-	-
4932	5521	6604	6880	6990	-	-

(Sources: Ldh/EHESS/Cassini).

== Cultural heritage ==
=== Secular buildings ===
- Manoir du Verger
- Manoir du Grand Blottereau
- Manoir du Petit Blottereau
- Manoir de la Rivière
- Manoir de la Colinière
- Manoir de la Chesnais
- Manoir de la Papitière
- Manoir de Bois-Briand

== See also ==
- Gare de Doulon (in French)

== Bibliography ==
- Guillet, Noël (2000). Doulon : De l'indépendance à l'annexion - Cent ans de vie municipale. Nantes: Association Doulon-histoire. p. 194. ISBN 2-908289-19-9.
- Doulon-Histoire, Du village à la ville, Doulon de la Révolution à la fin du 19e siècle, Éditions ACL, Nantes, 1985.
- Doulon-Histoire, Une paroisse au quotidien, Histoire de Saint-Médard de Doulon des origines à nos jours, Éditions ACL, Nantes, 1988.
- Noël Guillet, La Colinière, Nantes, 2004.
