= Hôtel de Ville, Carquefou =

Town hall in Carquefou, France

Hôtel de Ville
- The main frontage of the Hôtel de Ville in June 2021

General information
- Type: City hall
- Architectural style: Modern style
- Location: Carquefou, France
- Coordinates: 47.2990°N 1.4929°W
- Completed: 1986

The Hôtel de Ville (French pronunciation: [otɛl də vil], City Hall) is a municipal building in Carquefou, Loire-Atlantique, in western France, standing on Rue de l'Hôtel de Ville.

== History ==
The old town hall

Following the French Revolution, the new town council initially met in the home of the mayor at the time. This arrangement continued until September 1841, when the council led by the mayor, Alfred Guimberteau de la Maloliere, acquired a private house on the corner of the Route de Nantes (now Rue Jules Verne) and the Route de Sucé-sur-Erdre (now Place Aristide Briand) to serve as a combined town hall and school. However, in the early 1860s, the council led by the mayor, Pierre Ganuchaud, decided to commission a more substantial combined town hall and school. The site they selected was 200 metres (660 ft) to the south of the first building on the west side of Route de Nantes (now Rue Jules Verne). The new building was designed in the neoclassical style, built in brick with a cement render finish and was completed in 1865.

The design involved a symmetrical main frontage of three bays facing onto the street. The central bay featured a segmental-headed doorway with two square fanlights on the ground floor, a bi-partite window on the first floor and a gable above. The outer bays were fenestrated by bi-partite windows on both floors. Internally, the principal rooms were a municipal office and a courtroom on the first floor. After it was no longer required for municipal use, the building became the École Municipale de Musique (municipal school of music). The building was demolished after the school of music relocated to Les Renaudières in 2008.

In the early 1980s, following significant population growth, the council led by the mayor, Francis Sergent, decided to commission a modern municipal building. The site they selected was on the north side of what is now Rue de l'Hôtel de Ville. Construction of the new building started in April 1985. It was designed in the modern style, built in concrete and glass and was officially opened on 18 October 1986.

The building was laid out in four distinct sections with the first section on the left projected forward, the second section slightly projected forward, the third section slightly recessed, and the fourth section fully recessed. The first section was formed by a tower which was blind on the ground floor and fenestrated by rows of casement windows on the first and second floors. The second and third sections were formed by long horizontal structures which featured vaulted arcading on the ground floor and were fenestrated by rows on casement windows on the first floor. The fourth section was narrower but arcaded and fenestrated in a similar style to the second and third sections. The building was clad in white tiles, except for the third section which was clad in darker materials. Internally, the principal room was the Salle du Conseil, which was on the first floor of the building and featured a large horseshoe-shaped table.

In 1987, the council also purchased the Château de la Fleuriaye on the west side of the town to provide additional accommodate for certain council departments, specifically technical and economic services. In 2012, the château was repurposed as a community centre.
