= André Bizette-Lindet =

French sculptor

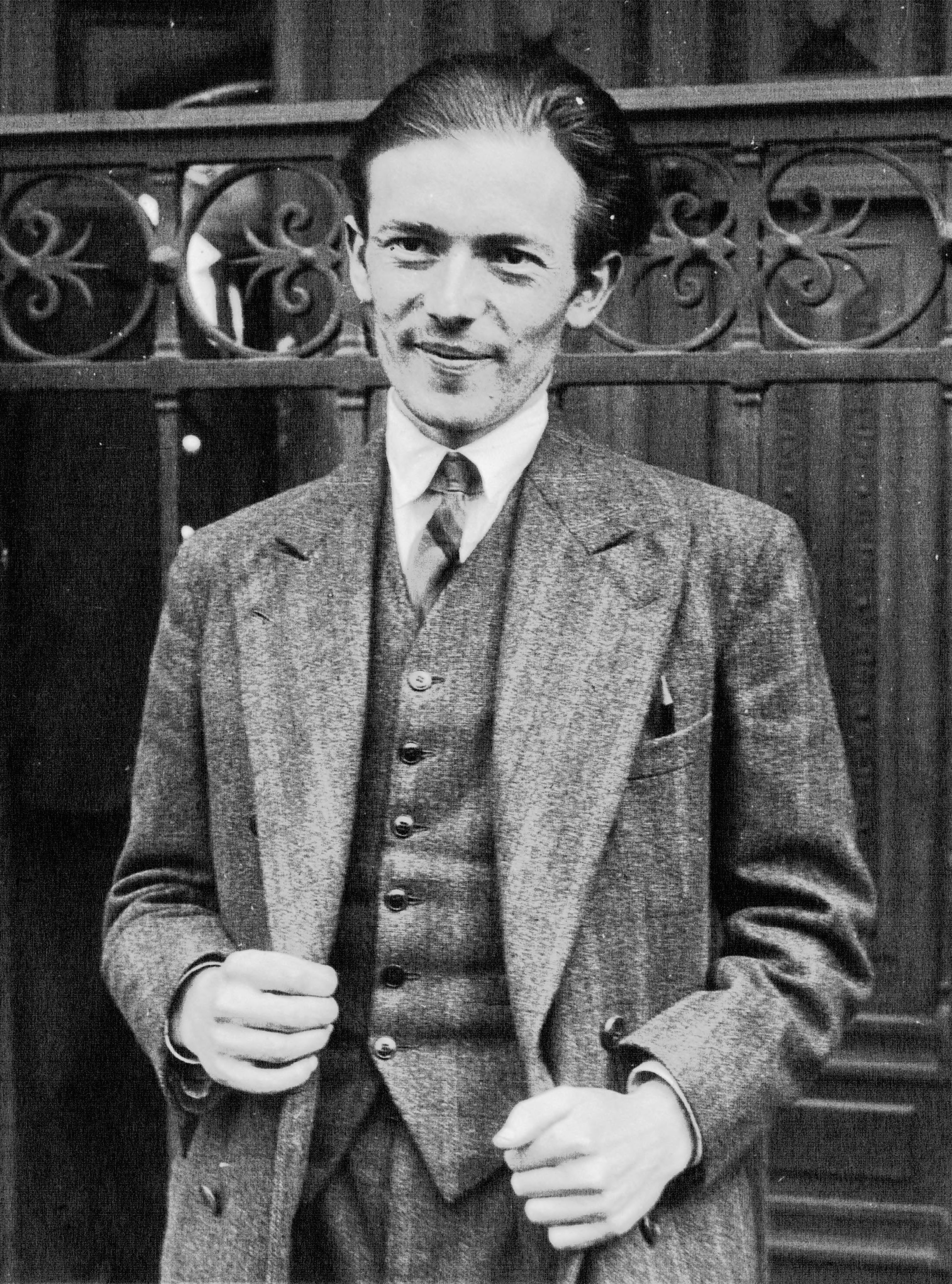
The sculptor in the year he won the Prix de Rome

André Bizette-Lindet (28 February 1906 – 28 December 1998) was a French sculptor. He won the Prix de Rome for sculpture in 1930. His work is held in many churches, public buildings and memorials in France and other countries.

== Biography ==
André Bizette-Lindet was born in 1906 in Savenay and died in Sèvres in 1988. He studied under Henri Bouchard at the École Nationale des Beaux Arts in Paris and was the winner of the Grand Prix de Rome for sculpture in 1930 at the young age of 25 and in 1936 he won a gold medal from the Salon des Artistes français in Paris. He worked with a variety of materials, including sandstone, marble, granite, slate, bronze, iron and ceramics. In 1937 he was commissioned to create some reliefs for the doors of the Palais de Tokyo in Paris, a most prestigious award and his career took a further leap forward when he was requested to contribute to the decoration of the Round Salon at the Embassy of France in Ottawa, Ontario, Canada, which was just being built. In 1939 he participated in the International Exposition in New York, working on France's pavilion there. He was commissioned to carry out the sculptural work for the memorial erected in Australia dedicated to all those Australians who had died fighting in France in the Great War, was one of the sculptors who participated in the huge undertaking at Suresnes to create a memorial to all those who had died in the Second World War as well as the memorial in Lille to all those in the French Resistance who had suffered at the hands of the Germans during the German occupation: the memorial for the martyrs of the Resistance. He completed much work in Saint Malo and Le Mans . Other work includes a large bas-relief for the "Salle des séances" at the Palais de l’Europe in Strasbourg, a statue in Rheims Cathedral, work on the high- altar for the cathedral at Rouen, a large relief in honour of Jean Bart at the Lycée in Dunkirk and some decoration for a salon in the Palais de l’Élysée. Apart from his sculptural work he was an accomplished painter and was appointed as official painter to the French Navy. He was also responsible for a statue honoring General Leclerc in Le Mans, and for the seven bronze and gilded sculptures representing the arts which adorned the theatre in the place des Jacobins, Le Mans. This theatre has been closed down and demolished, although Bizette Lindet's work has been saved. Also in Le Mans he carried out sculptural work on the University Science building in the rue Montbarbet.

== Works ==
Name	Location	Date	Notes
The Javelin thrower	École nationale supérieure des Beaux-Arts in Paris	1906	"Le lanceur de javelot" won the Prix de Rome for sculpture in 1930.
La danse autour de la colonne	Roubaix	1934	This bronze can be seen in the old swimming baths which has been imaginatively converted into an art gallery and exhibition space. The bronze was purchased by the State in 1938. The French foundry Susse Fondeur Arcueil carried out the casting. Although it is now in Roubaix, Bizette-Lindet carried out this work whilst in Rome.
Tete de jeune paysanne	Pompidou Centre Paris	1941	This work is in terracotta and was executed in Provence and acquired by the State in 1942. The sculpture is of the head of a young peasant girl.
Buste d'une jeune siennoise	École nationale supérieure des Beaux-Arts in Paris		This work in marble, the bust of a young girl from Sienna, was exhibited at the Petit Palais and then the Salon des Artistes français.
Le Chant de la Sirène	Vincent Lecuyer Gallery Paris		A work in bronze.
Work in the Lycée Antoine Antoine	Chenôve	1976	This work, comprising four ornamented benches, made from cement, can be seen at the Lycée Antoine Antoine in Chenôve in Côte-d'Or. Sadly the work is no longer in good condition. The work was installed when the Lycée Antoine Antoine was built.
The Franco-Australian War Memorial	Yarralumla		This memorial, erected by the French government as a token of gratitude to the Australian soldiers who fought and died on the battlefields of France in 1914–1918, bears witness to the role that Australia played in the liberation of France. It stands in the grounds of the French Embassy in Yarralumla, a suburb of Canberra. It was unveiled on July 28, 1961, at a ceremony attended by a number of high-ranking dignitaries, including General de Gaulle's special envoy, General Zinovi Pechkoff (son of Maxim Gorki) and General Apfert, commander of the French Pacific Forces, who joined the Prime Minister of Australia, Robert Menzies, as well as both French and Australian military representatives. The monument itself is composed of two sections: the square pillar, designed by French architect Desmaret, and the sculpture which surmounts it. On the front of the pillar the words "Aux Australiens qui sont tombés sur la terre de France en souvenir de leur sacrifice pour la liberté des peuples 1914-1918" (To those Australians who fell on French soil, in memory of their sacrifice for the freedom of all peoples) are inscribed, and on the sides, the names of the most prominent battles in which Australian troops were involved during the Great War - Armentières, Villers-Bretonneux, Fromelles, Dernancourt, Pozières, Mont St Quentin, Bullecourt, Somme, Amiens, and Bellicourt. Bizette- Lindet's sculpture at the top of the memorial is entitled "Winged Victory" and is worked in gilded bronze.
Sculpture on the front of the Église Saint-Martin.	Donges		During the bombing of 24 and 25 July 1944, this church in Donges, which had been built in 1882, was destroyed and a new church, designed by Jean Dorian, was built in the 1950s. Bizette-Lindet was responsible for the sculpture on the church's façade.
Cérès	Barentin	1955	This sculpture portrays "Cérès" the Roman goddess of agriculture, grain crops, fertility and motherly relationships.
Le Signal	Sèvres		This work can be seen at 11, avenue de la Cristallerie.
Work for the Université de Caen Basse-Normandie	Caen		Bizette-Lindet carried out some sculptural work for this university.
Sculptural decoration for the French Embassy in Ottawa	Ottawa	1930s	When built in the 1930s, the French Embassy in Ottawa was regarded as a splendid example of Art Deco architecture. Bizette-Lindet carried out sculptural work in the Embassy's so-called "Round Salon". This small room, also called “the little Dining Room,” acquired its name because of its cylindrical form. It serves, very much like the Smoking Room and the Main Salon, as a place of reception. It is mainly decorated by three terracotta panels from André Bizette-Lindet, illustrating the lives of Roland le Preux, Saint Louis and Joan of Arc.
Statue of Jean-Jacques Rousseau	Paris		Bizette-Lindet's sculpture of Jean-Jacques Rousseau replaced a previous statue which was the work of Paul Berthet.
Sculpture at Orly Airport	Paris	1960	Bizette-Lindet completed a sculpture for Orly airport.
Sculptures in Saint-Malo's rue Thévenard	Saint-Malo		In St Malo and the rue Thévenard are two arcades which cross the road and in these arcades are four niches which hold glazed stoneware sculptures by Bizette-Lindet.
Mémorial de la Résistance et de la Déportation	Lille		For their memorial to mark the activities of the French resistance and the deportation of so many to concentration and labour camps by the occupying Germans, the people of Lille made an imaginative choice and it was decided that the Noble tower should mark the acts of extreme bravery on the one hand and extreme suffering on the other. André Bizette-Lindet's sculpture is affixed to the tower wall and can be seen in the photograph shown here. The Noble tower in Lille's Rue des déportés, was built during the 100 Years' War by Philip the Bold, Duke of Burgundy, to protect himself against the French armies. The Noble tower was the highest of 65 towers set into the city walls.
Work in the Basilique Notre-Dame de la Trinité	Blois	1934-1949	This Basilica is in Blois in Loir-et-Cher. Building commenced in 1934 but the outbreak of war and other factors delayed completion and it was finally consecrated on 16 July 1949. André Bizette-Lindet was one of several sculptors commissioned to carry out work on the Basilica, working alongside Joël and Jean Martel and Jean Lambert-Rucki.
Monument dedicated to Cardinal George Grente, Archbishop of Le Man	Le Man		George Grente was Archbishop of Le Mans from 1918 to 1959. He was a writer and an historian and was made Cardinal in 1953 and attended the 1958 conclave. He was elected a member of the Académie française in 1936, taking the seat that Pierre de Nohlac had held. It was Grente himself who gave the commission to Bizette-Lindet. The work was completed in 1965. Bizette-Lindet's sculpture follows the tradition of the 15th-century statues in the manner in which he depicts the Cardinal; recumbent and praying.
Reliefs for the entrance doors of the Palais de Tokyo.	Paris		The Palais de Tokyo has three exceptional doors, two on the avenue du Président Wilson and a third on the avenue de New York by the Seine. The two doors opening on to the avenue du Président Wilson were made by Adalbert Szabo and the sculptors André Bizette-Lindet and Gabriel Forestier, whilst the door opening on to avenue de New York is the work of the sculptor Louis-Jules Dideron and the founder Raymond Subes
Large relief sculpture in front of Lycée Jean Bart	Dunkirk		Bizette-Lindet was the sculptor of the large bas-relief which stands in front of Dunkirk's Lycée Jean Bart.
Statue of the Duke of Morny	Deauville		The statue of the Duke of Morny stands in the Place du Marche.
Sculptural decoration for theatre in Le Mans	Le Mans		Bizette-Lindet carried out some sculptural work for a theatre in Le Mans. This was recently demolished but Bizette-Lindet's work was saved.
Work in Rouen Cathedral	Rouen	1955	Bizette-Lindet created the main altar in the choir area of the cathedral. A table made of green marble from the Aoste Valley rests on symbols in gilded lead which are representations of the Evangelists.
Sculpture for Lycée Montesquieu.	Le Mans		Bizette-Lindet was commissioned to create a sculpture for this college.
Mémorial de la France combattante	Mont-Valérien		Bizette-Lindet carved one of the reliefs on the Mémorial de la France combattante at Mont-Valérien. His composition comprised a wounded dragon attacking a serpent. In using this composition to recall the efforts of General Leclerc in taking the Koufra oasis in Libya from the German Afrika Corps, the sculptor suggests France's rebirth as a fighting nation.

== Gallery of images ==
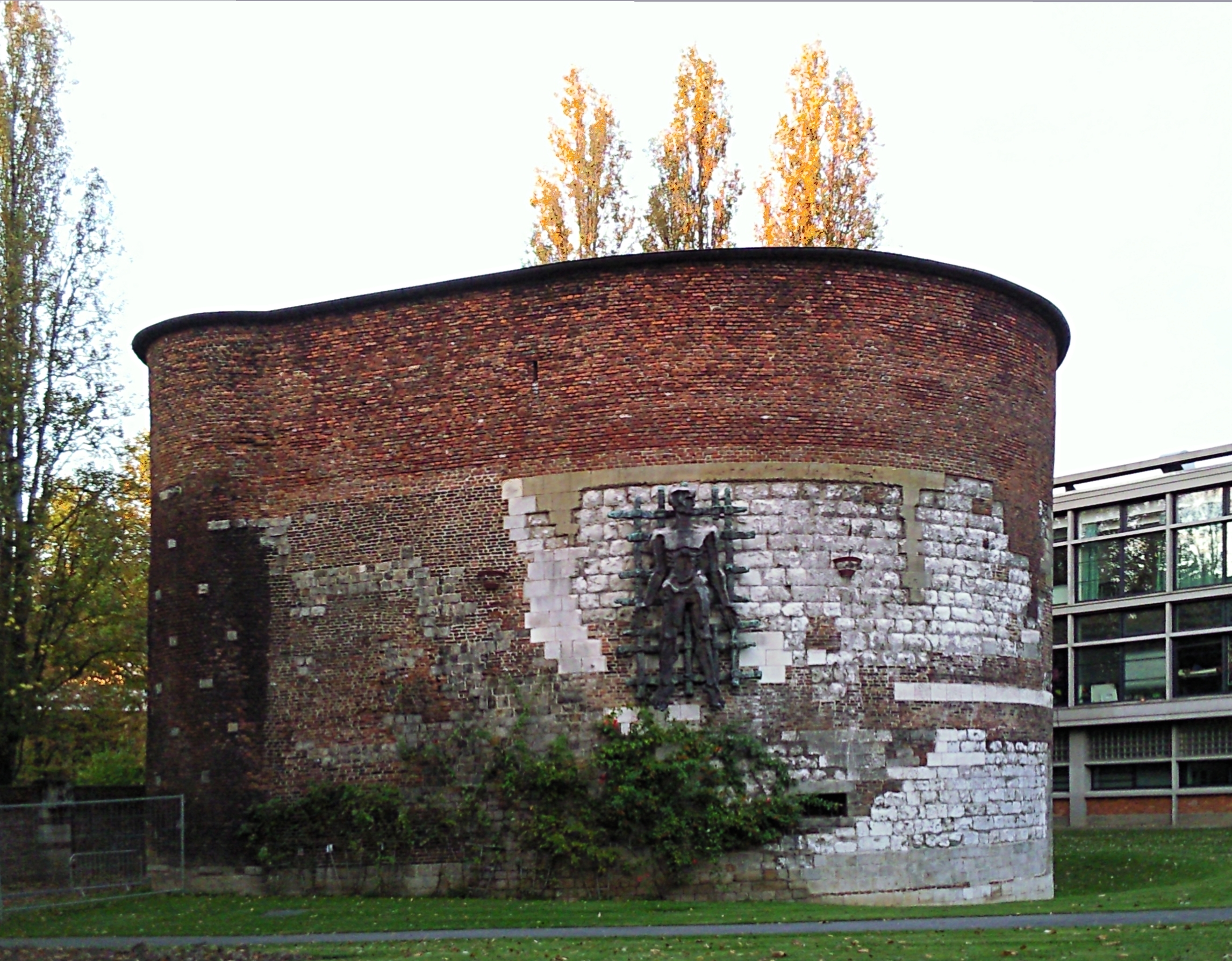
Mémorial de la Résistance et de la Déportation Lille

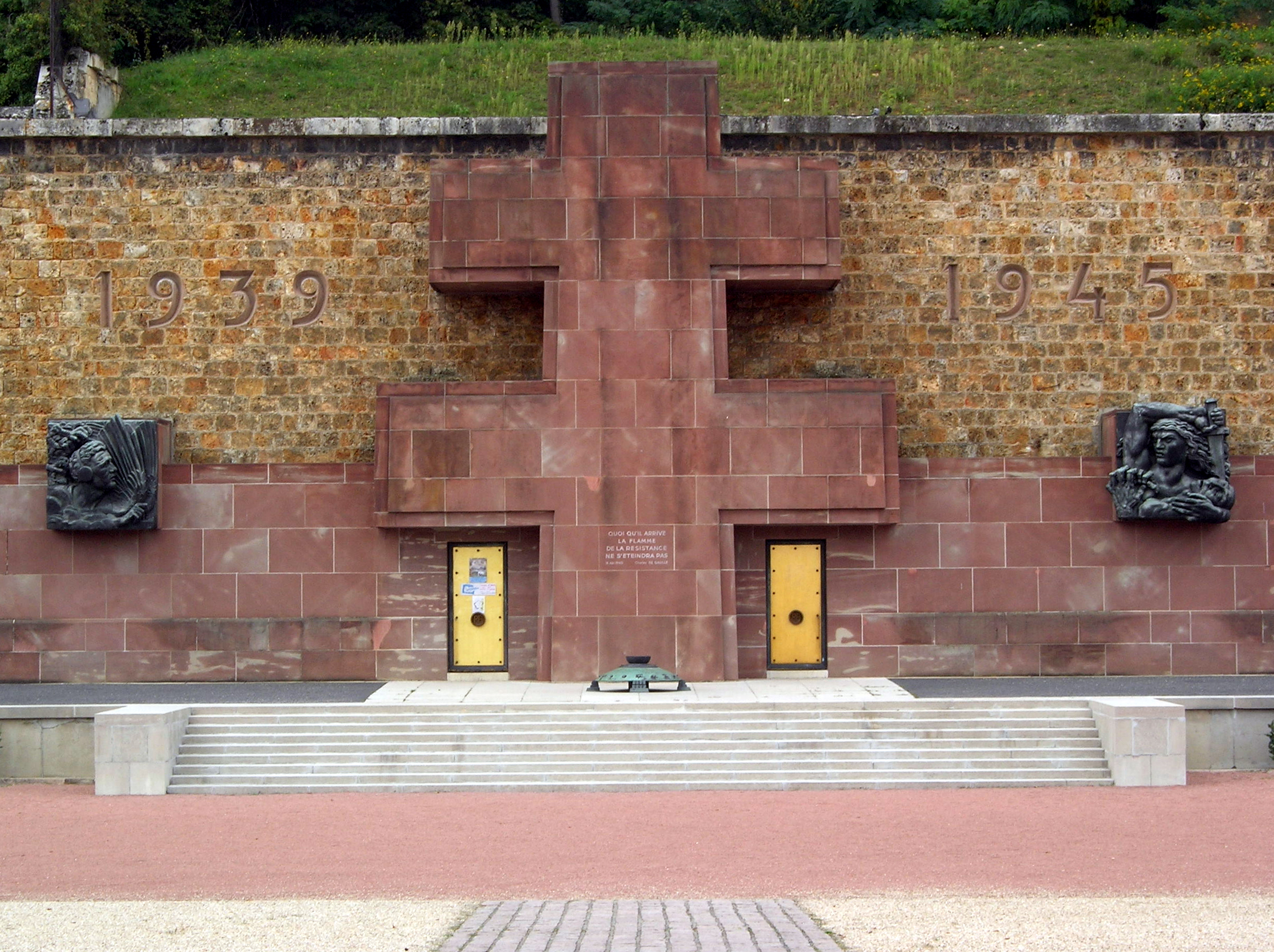
The Cross of Lorraine at the entrance to the Mont-Valerien crypt.

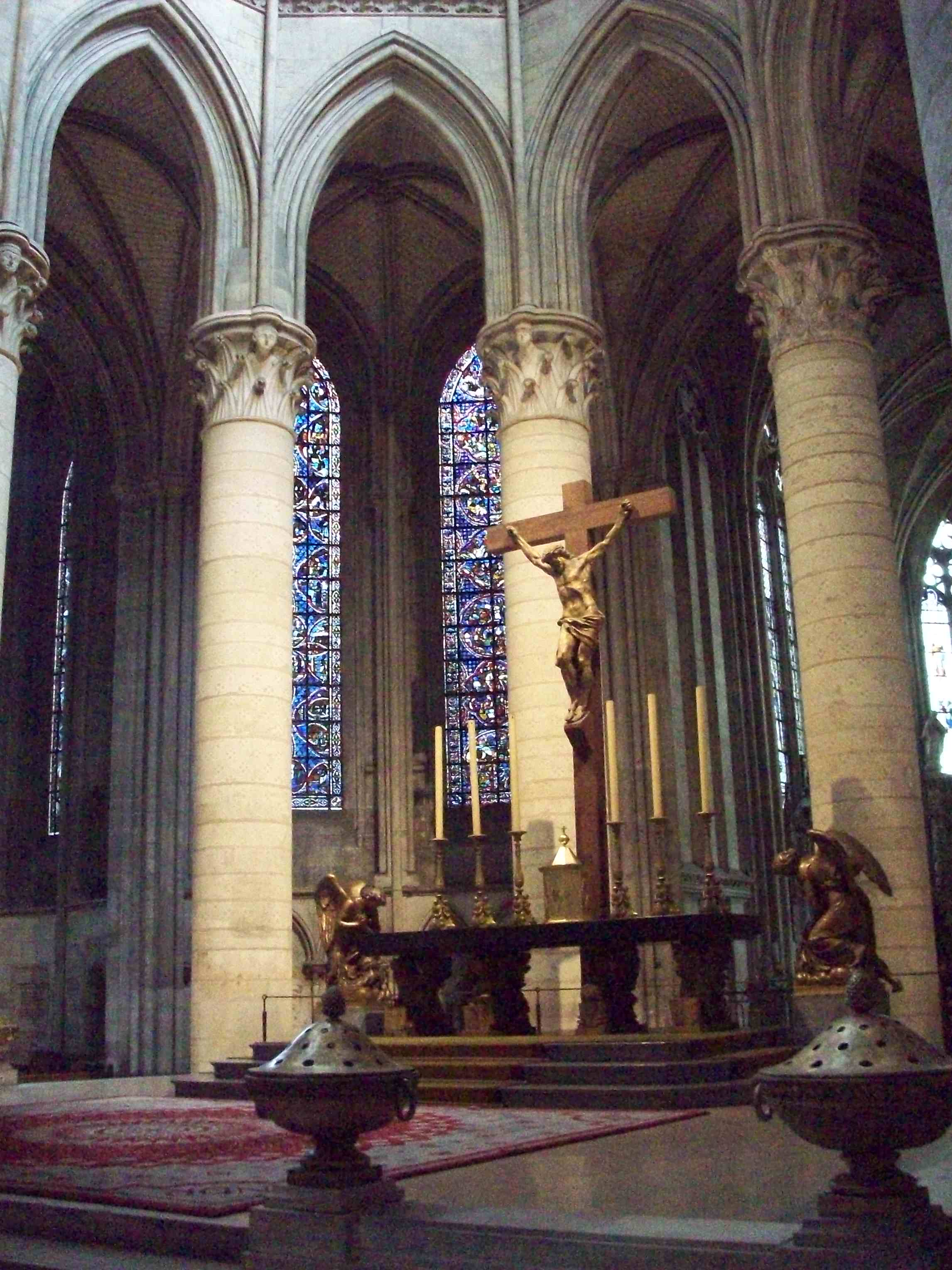
Altar in the choir area of Rouen Cathedral
