= Saint-Malo-de-Guersac =

- Commune
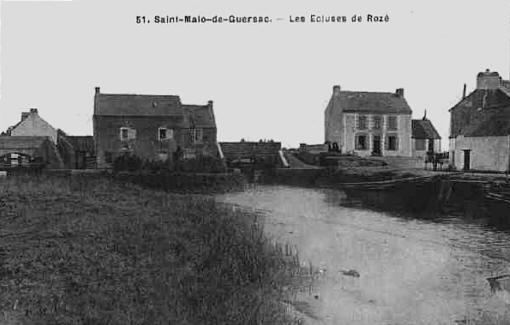
- Canal lock
- Location of Saint-Malo-de-Guersac
- Location within France Location within Pays de la Loire
- Coordinates: 47°21′05″N 2°10′44″W
- Country: France
- Region: Pays de la Loire
- Department: Loire-Atlantique
- Arrondissement: Saint-Nazaire
- Canton: Saint-Nazaire-2
- Intercommunality: CA Région Nazairienne et Estuaire

Government
  - Mayor (2020–2026): Jean-Michel Crand
- Area^{1}: 14.62 km^{2} (5.64 sq mi)
- Highest elevation: 13 m (43 ft)
- Lowest elevation: 0 m (0 ft)
- Population (2023): 3,203
  - Density: 219.1/km^{2} (567.4/sq mi)
- Time zone: UTC+01:00 (CET)
  - Summer (DST): UTC+02:00 (CEST)
- INSEE/Postal code: 44176 /44550
- ^{1} French Land Register data, which excludes lakes, ponds, glaciers > 1 km^{2} (0.386 sq mi or 247 acres) and river estuaries.

Saint-Malo-de-Guersac (French pronunciation: [sɛ̃ malo də ɡɛʁsak]; Breton: Sant-Maloù-Gwersac'h) is a commune in the Loire-Atlantique department in western France. It was created in 1925 from part of the commune of Montoir-de-Bretagne.

It is located 15 km (9.3 mi) from Saint-Nazaire in Brière.

== Population ==
Historical population
| Year | Pop. | ±% p.a. |
|---|---|---|
| 1968 | 2,247 | — |
| 1975 | 2,461 | +1.31% |
| 1982 | 3,286 | +4.22% |
| 1990 | 3,294 | +0.03% |
| 1999 | 3,126 | −0.58% |
| 2007 | 3,082 | −0.18% |
| 2012 | 3,215 | +0.85% |
| 2017 | 3,166 | −0.31% |
| 2023 | 3,203 | +0.19% |
Source: INSEE

== See also ==
- Communes of the Loire-Atlantique department
- Parc naturel régional de Brière
