= Donges =

Donges Donj (Gallo) Donez (Breton)
- Commune
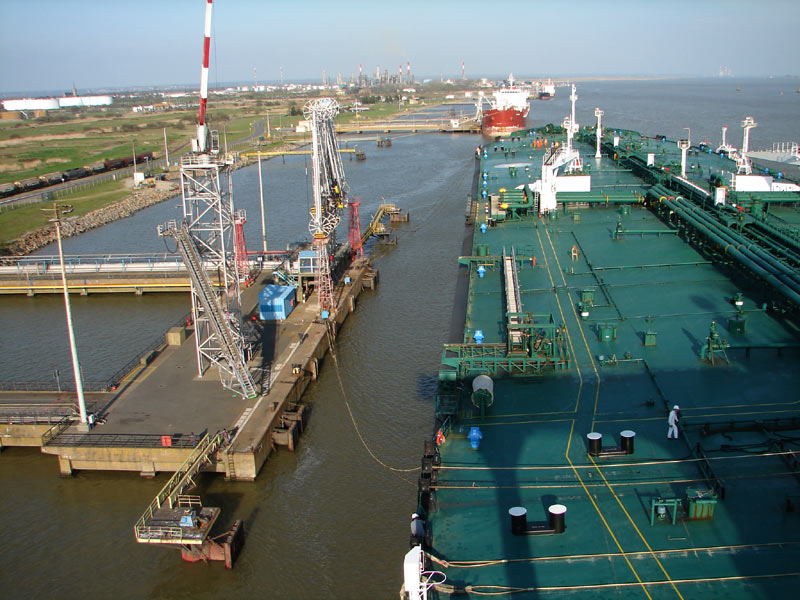
- Oil tanker in the port

- Flag Coat of arms
- Location of Donges
- Location within France Location within Pays de la Loire
- Coordinates: 47°19′27″N 2°04′30″W
- Country: France
- Region: Pays de la Loire
- Department: Loire-Atlantique
- Arrondissement: Saint-Nazaire
- Canton: Saint-Nazaire-2
- Intercommunality: CA Région Nazairienne et Estuaire

Government
  - Mayor (2020–2026): François Chéneau
- Area^{1}: 59.9 km^{2} (23.1 sq mi)
- Highest elevation: 31 m (102 ft)
- Lowest elevation: 0 m (0 ft)
- Population (2023): 8,219
  - Density: 137/km^{2} (355/sq mi)
- Time zone: UTC+01:00 (CET)
  - Summer (DST): UTC+02:00 (CEST)
- INSEE/Postal code: 44052 /44480
- ^{1} French Land Register data, which excludes lakes, ponds, glaciers > 1 km^{2} (0.386 sq mi or 247 acres) and river estuaries.

Donges (French pronunciation: [dɔ̃ʒ]; Gallo: Donj, Breton: Donez) is a commune in the Loire-Atlantique department in the region of Pays de la Loire, France.

== Population ==
Historical population

Year	Pop.	±% p.a.
1793	2,112	—
1800	2,054	−0.40%
1806	1,904	−1.26%
1821	2,230	+1.06%
1831	2,650	+1.74%
1841	2,700	+0.19%
1846	2,809	+0.79%
1851	2,808	−0.01%
1856	3,004	+1.36%
1861	3,006	+0.01%
1866	3,055	+0.32%
1872	2,890	−0.92%
1876	2,889	−0.01%
1881	2,918	+0.20%
1886	2,902	−0.11%
1891	2,933	+0.21%
1896	2,925	−0.05%
1901	2,883	−0.29%

Year	Pop.	±% p.a.
1906	2,886	+0.02%
1911	2,862	−0.17%
1921	2,745	−0.42%
1926	2,770	+0.18%
1931	2,703	−0.49%
1936	2,896	+1.39%
1946	3,022	+0.43%
1954	4,590	+5.36%
1962	6,263	+3.96%
1968	6,458	+0.51%
1975	6,280	−0.40%
1982	6,726	+0.98%
1990	6,377	−0.66%
1999	6,157	−0.39%
2007	6,467	+0.62%
2012	7,092	+1.86%
2017	7,961	+2.34%
2023	8,219	+0.53%

Source: EHESS and INSEE (1968–2023)

== See also ==
- Communes of the Loire-Atlantique department
- Parc naturel régional de Brière
- André Bizette-Lindet
