= Trignac =

- Commune
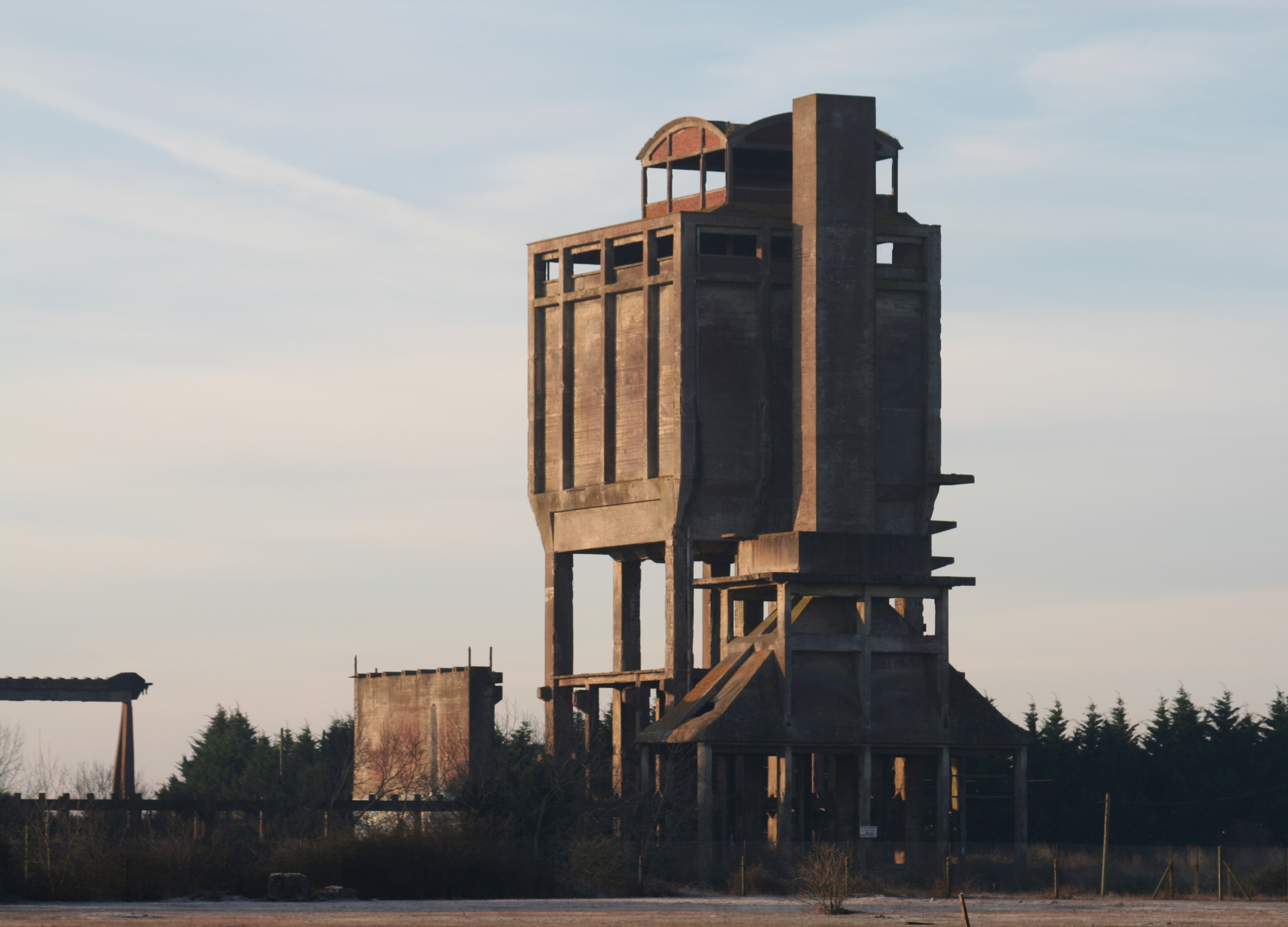
- Remains of the Forges de Trignac
- Location of Trignac
- Location within France Location within Pays de la Loire
- Coordinates: 47°19′08″N 2°11′16″W
- Country: France
- Region: Pays de la Loire
- Department: Loire-Atlantique
- Arrondissement: Saint-Nazaire
- Canton: Saint-Nazaire-2
- Intercommunality: CA Région Nazairienne et Estuaire

Government
  - Mayor (2020–2026): Claude Aufort
- Area^{1}: 14.38 km^{2} (5.55 sq mi)
- Highest elevation: 10 m (33 ft)
- Lowest elevation: 0 m (0 ft)
- Population (2023): 8,397
  - Density: 583.9/km^{2} (1,512/sq mi)
- Demonym(s): Trignacaises, Trignacais
- Time zone: UTC+01:00 (CET)
  - Summer (DST): UTC+02:00 (CEST)
- INSEE/Postal code: 44210 /44570
- Website: www.mairie-trignac.fr
- ^{1} French Land Register data, which excludes lakes, ponds, glaciers > 1 km^{2} (0.386 sq mi or 247 acres) and river estuaries.

Trignac (French pronunciation: [tʁiɲak]; Breton: Trinieg) is a commune in the Loire-Atlantique department in western France. It was created in 1913 from part of the commune of Montoir-de-Bretagne.

== Population ==
Historical population
| Year | Pop. | ±% p.a. |
|---|---|---|
| 1968 | 7,076 | — |
| 1975 | 7,253 | +0.35% |
| 1982 | 7,180 | −0.14% |
| 1990 | 7,020 | −0.28% |
| 1999 | 6,956 | −0.10% |
| 2007 | 7,225 | +0.48% |
| 2012 | 7,153 | −0.20% |
| 2017 | 7,868 | +1.92% |
| 2023 | 8,397 | +1.09% |
Source: INSEE

== See also ==
- Communes of the Loire-Atlantique department
- Parc naturel régional de Brière
