= Saint-Herblain =

Saint-Herblain Saent-Erbelaen (Gallo) Sant-Ervlan (Breton)
- Commune
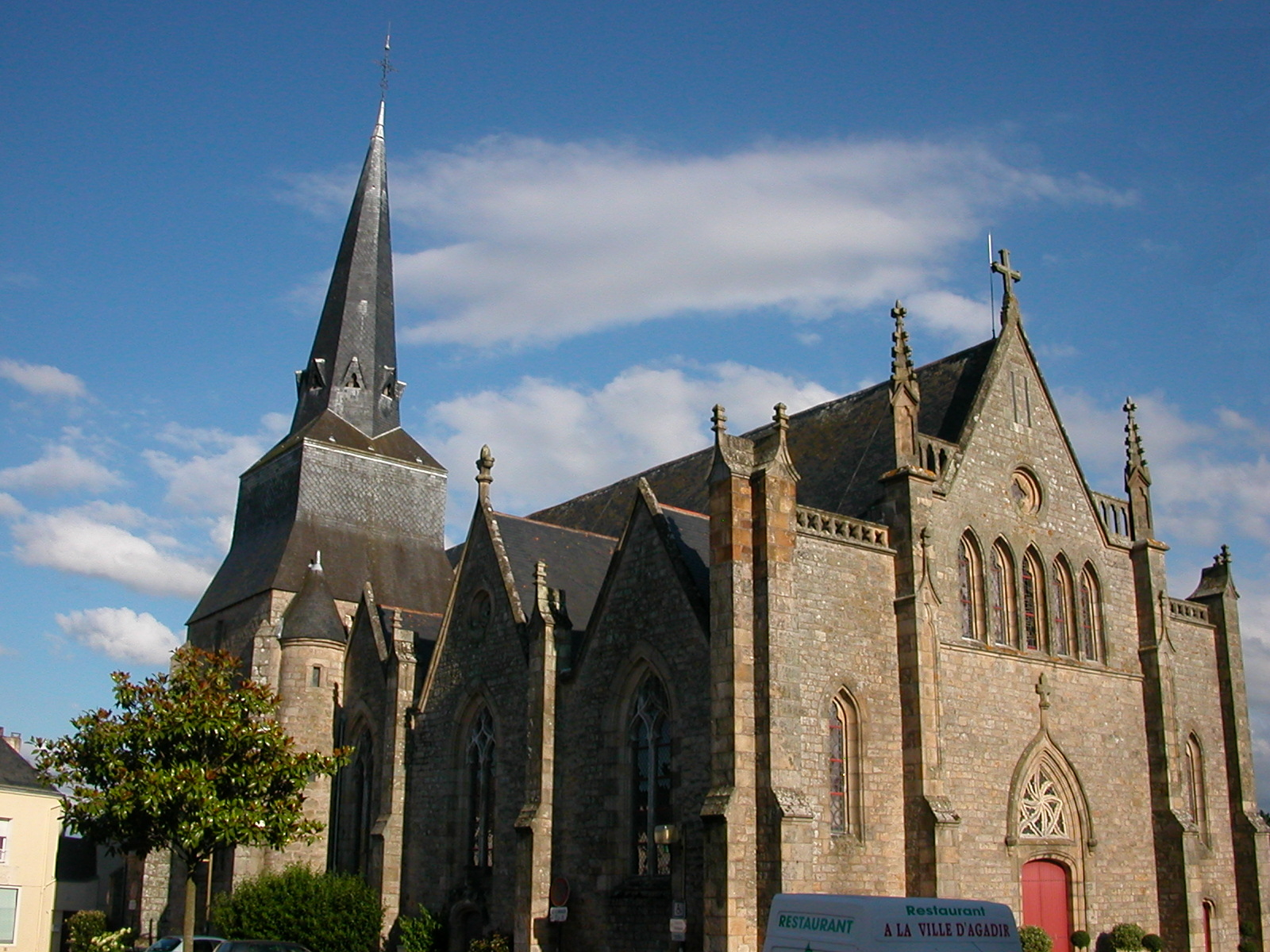

- Coat of arms
- Location of Saint-Herblain
- Location within France Location within Pays de la Loire
- Coordinates: 47°12′44″N 1°38′59″W
- Country: France
- Region: Pays de la Loire
- Department: Loire-Atlantique
- Arrondissement: Nantes
- Canton: Saint-Herblain-1 and 2
- Intercommunality: Nantes Métropole

Government
  - Mayor (2020–2026): Bertrand Affilé
- Area^{1}: 30.02 km^{2} (11.59 sq mi)
- Highest elevation: 64 m (210 ft)
- Lowest elevation: 1 m (3.3 ft)
- Population (2023): 50,973
  - Density: 1,698/km^{2} (4,398/sq mi)
- Time zone: UTC+01:00 (CET)
  - Summer (DST): UTC+02:00 (CEST)
- INSEE/Postal code: 44162 /44800
- ^{1} French Land Register data, which excludes lakes, ponds, glaciers > 1 km^{2} (0.386 sq mi or 247 acres) and river estuaries.

Saint-Herblain (French pronunciation: [sɛ̃t‿ɛʁblɛ̃]; Gallo: Saent-Erbelaen, Breton: Sant-Ervlan, pronounced [ˈsãnt ɛrvlãn]) is a commune in the Loire-Atlantique department, administrative region of Pays de la Loire, France.

It is the largest suburb of the city of Nantes, and lies adjacent to its west side.

== History ==
The commune is named after the 7th-century AD Saint Hermeland (French: Herblain and other names; Hermelandus in Breton and Latin), abbot and confessor under the Frankish king Chlothar III.

== Population ==
Historical population

Year	Pop.	±% p.a.
1793	2,000	—
1800	1,830	−1.26%
1806	2,302	+3.90%
1821	2,192	−0.33%
1831	2,388	+0.86%
1841	2,375	−0.05%
1846	2,267	−0.93%
1851	2,410	+1.23%
1856	2,449	+0.32%
1861	2,482	+0.27%
1866	2,607	+0.99%
1872	2,578	−0.19%
1876	2,611	+0.32%
1881	2,569	−0.32%
1886	2,603	+0.26%
1891	2,683	+0.61%
1896	2,508	−1.34%
1901	2,535	+0.21%

Year	Pop.	±% p.a.
1906	2,589	+0.42%
1911	2,664	+0.57%
1921	2,874	+0.76%
1926	3,345	+3.08%
1931	3,981	+3.54%
1936	4,678	+3.28%
1946	5,506	+1.64%
1954	7,636	+4.17%
1962	11,990	+5.80%
1968	17,568	+6.57%
1975	39,867	+12.42%
1982	41,958	+0.73%
1990	42,774	+0.24%
1999	43,726	+0.24%
2007	43,516	−0.06%
2012	43,287	−0.11%
2017	46,268	+1.34%
2023	50,973	+1.63%

Source: EHESS and INSEE (1968-2023)

== Breton language ==
In 2008, 0,36% of the children attended the bilingual schools in primary education. The school network in Breton Diwan has opened a college in Saint-Herblain, the first in the area.

== Transport ==
The Basse-Indre–Saint-Herblain station is served by regional trains between Nantes and Saint-Nazaire.

== Buildings and structures ==
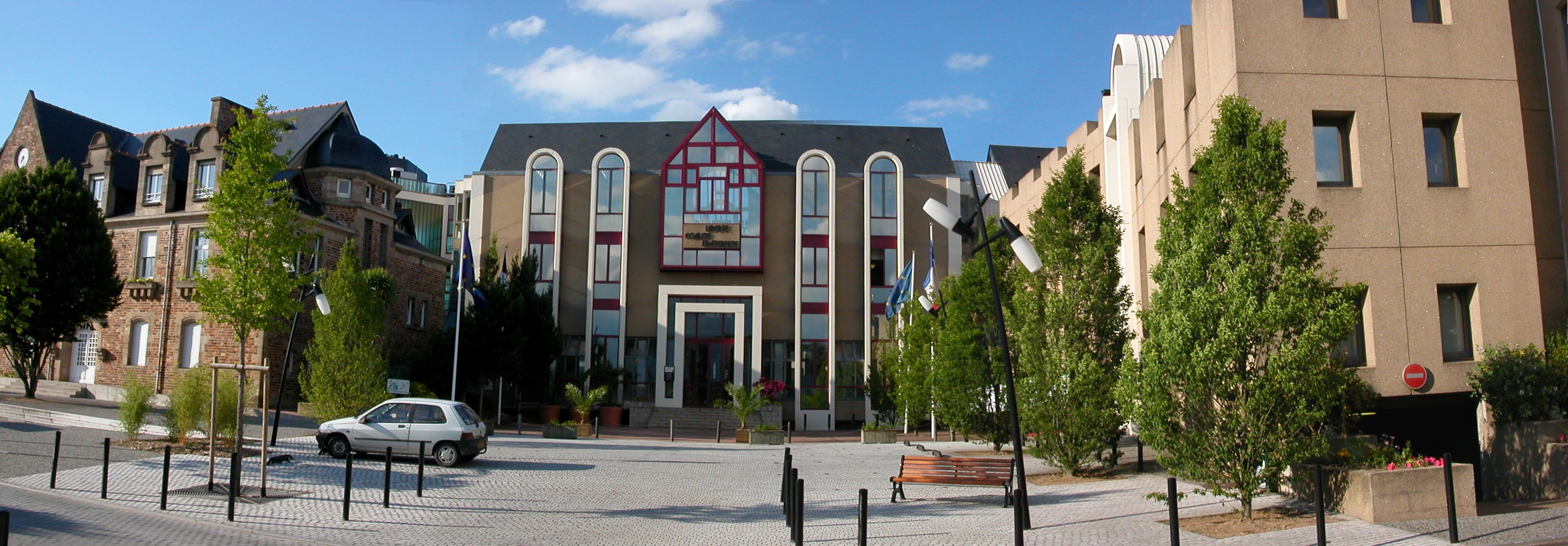
The Hôtel de Ville (the original building on the left and the extension in the centre)

- The Hôtel de Ville was completed in 1938.
- The telecommunications tower, which is 110 metres (360 ft) high, was built of concrete and completed in 2000.

== Twin towns - sister cities ==
Saint-Herblain is twinned with:

- Sankt Ingbert, Germany, since 1981
- (Republic of Ireland) Waterford City, Ireland, since 1986 where a housing estate is named after the suburb, St Herblain Park
- Viladecans, Spain, since 1991
- N’Diaganiao, Senegal
- Kazanlak, Bulgaria, since 2008
- Cleja, Romania

== See also ==
- Communes of the Loire-Atlantique department
