= Saint-Léger-les-Vignes =

- Commune
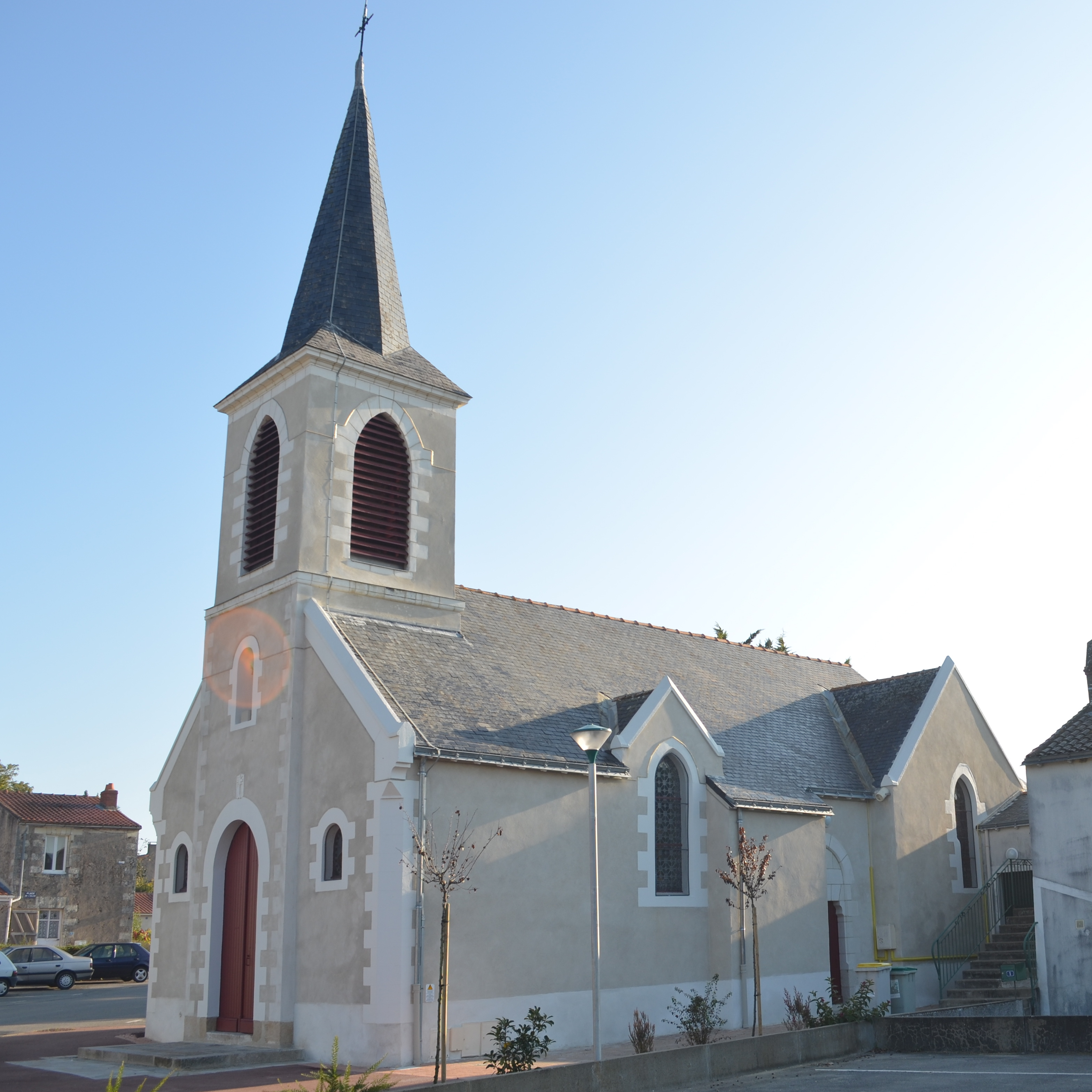
- The church in Saint-Léger-les-Vignes

- Coat of arms
- Location of Saint-Léger-les-Vignes
- Location within France Location within Pays de la Loire
- Coordinates: 47°08′13″N 1°43′52″W
- Country: France
- Region: Pays de la Loire
- Department: Loire-Atlantique
- Arrondissement: Nantes
- Canton: Rezé-1
- Intercommunality: Nantes Métropole

Government
  - Mayor (2020–2026): Patrick Grolier
- Area^{1}: 6.49 km^{2} (2.51 sq mi)
- Highest elevation: 29 m (95 ft)
- Lowest elevation: 0 m (0 ft)
- Population (2023): 2,171
  - Density: 335/km^{2} (866/sq mi)
- Time zone: UTC+01:00 (CET)
  - Summer (DST): UTC+02:00 (CEST)
- INSEE/Postal code: 44171 /44710
- ^{1} French Land Register data, which excludes lakes, ponds, glaciers > 1 km^{2} (0.386 sq mi or 247 acres) and river estuaries.

Saint-Léger-les-Vignes (French pronunciation: [sɛ̃ leʒe le viɲ]; Breton: Sant-Lezer-ar-Gwiniegi) is a commune in the Loire-Atlantique department in western France.

== Population ==
Historical population
Year	Pop.	±% p.a.
1968	451	—
1975	484	+1.01%
1982	721	+5.86%
1990	946	+3.45%
1999	1,158	+2.27%
2007	1,406	+2.46%
2012	1,540	+1.84%
2017	1,844	+3.67%
2023	2,171	+2.76%
Source: INSEE

== See also ==
- Communes of the Loire-Atlantique department
