= Saint-Aignan-Grandlieu =

- Commune
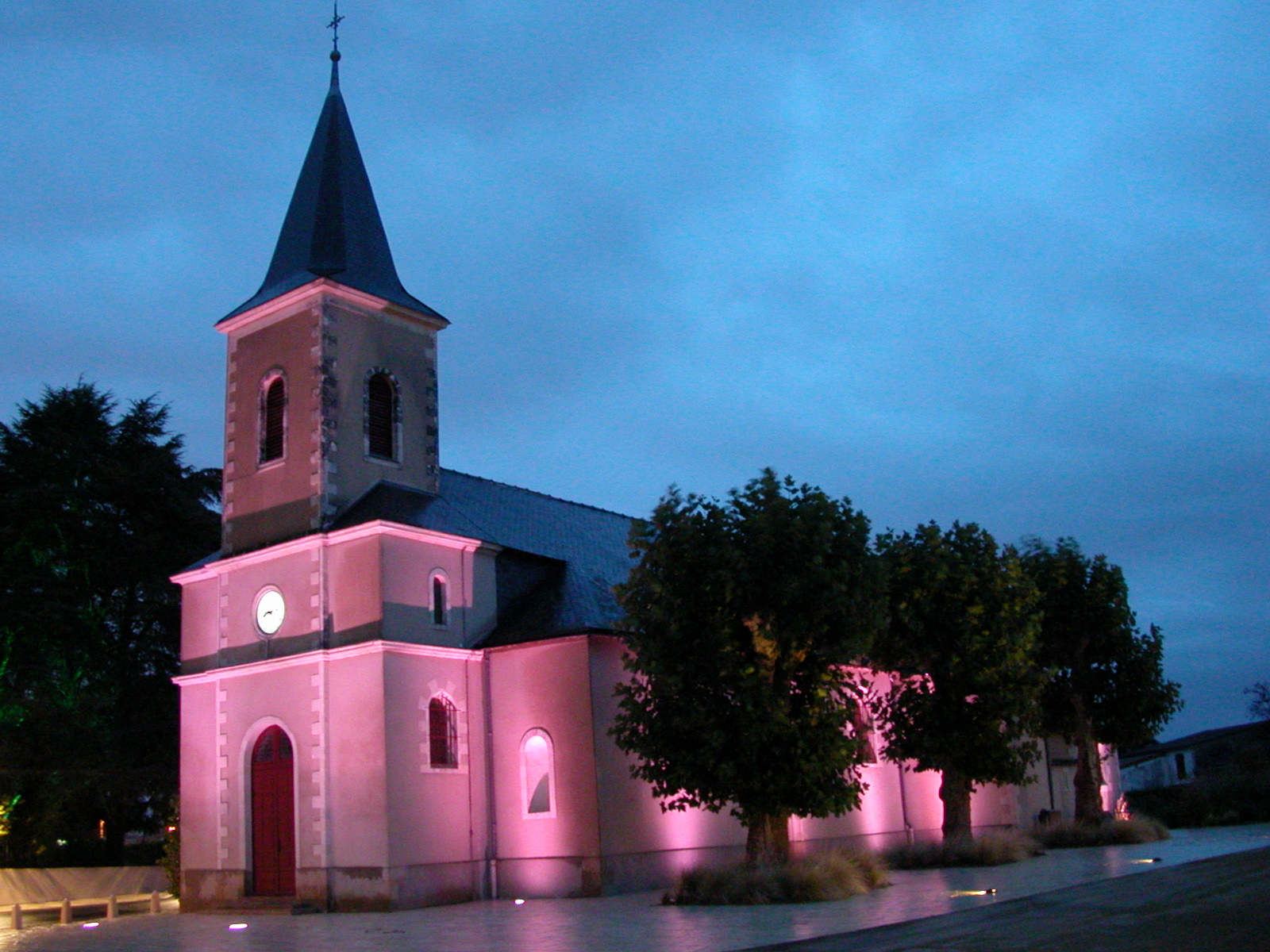

- Coat of arms
- Location of Saint-Aignan-Grandlieu
- Location within France Location within Pays de la Loire
- Coordinates: 47°07′28″N 1°37′46″W
- Country: France
- Region: Pays de la Loire
- Department: Loire-Atlantique
- Arrondissement: Nantes
- Canton: Rezé-1
- Intercommunality: Nantes Métropole

Government
  - Mayor (2020–2026): Jean-Claude Lemasson
- Area^{1}: 17.94 km^{2} (6.93 sq mi)
- Highest elevation: 29 m (95 ft)
- Lowest elevation: 0 m (0 ft)
- Population (2023): 3,996
  - Density: 222.7/km^{2} (576.9/sq mi)
- Time zone: UTC+01:00 (CET)
  - Summer (DST): UTC+02:00 (CEST)
- INSEE/Postal code: 44150 /44860
- ^{1} French Land Register data, which excludes lakes, ponds, glaciers > 1 km^{2} (0.386 sq mi or 247 acres) and river estuaries.

Saint-Aignan-Grandlieu (French pronunciation: [sɛ̃t‿ɛɲɑ̃ ɡʁɑ̃ljø]; Breton: Sant-Enion-al-Lenn-Veur; Gallo: Saent-Aenyan-Graund-Loe) is a commune in the Loire-Atlantique department in the administrative region of Pays de la Loire, France.

== Weather ==
In 2010, the climate of the commune was classified as a temperate oceanic climate, according to a CNRS study based on data from 1971 to 2000. In 2020, Météo-France published a classification of metropolitan France's climates, in which the commune was identified as having an oceanic climate. It is located in the climate region covering eastern and southern Brittany, the Nantes area, and the Vendée, characterized by low rainfall in summer and good levels of sunshine.

For the period of 1971 to 2000, the average annual temperature was 12.3 °C, with a yearly temperature range of 13.3 °C. Average annual precipitation was 802 mm, with 12.5 days of rainfall in January and 6.4 in July. For the period 1991–2020, the average annual temperature recorded at the nearest Météo-France weather station, Nantes-Bouguenais (in the commune of Bouguenais, 6 km away as the crow flies), was 12.7 °C, and the average annual precipitation was 819.5 mm. Projections for 2050, based on different greenhouse gas emission scenarios, are available on a dedicated website published by Météo-France in November 2022.

== Population ==
Historical population

Year	Pop.	±% p.a.
1793	1,167	—
1821	1,172	+0.02%
1846	1,205	+0.11%
1872	1,255	+0.16%
1901	1,283	+0.08%
1926	1,110	−0.58%
1946	1,146	+0.16%
1962	1,372	+1.13%
1968	1,357	−0.18%

Year	Pop.	±% p.a.
1975	1,717	+3.42%
1982	2,489	+5.45%
1990	3,033	+2.50%
1999	3,483	+1.55%
2007	3,480	−0.01%
2012	3,590	+0.62%
2017	3,944	+1.90%
2023	3,996	+0.22%

Source: EHESS and INSEE (1968-2023)

== See also ==
- Communes of the Loire-Atlantique department
