= Montoir-de-Bretagne =

Montoir-de-Bretagne Montoér/Montouèrr (Gallo) Mouster-al-Loc'h (Breton)
- Commune
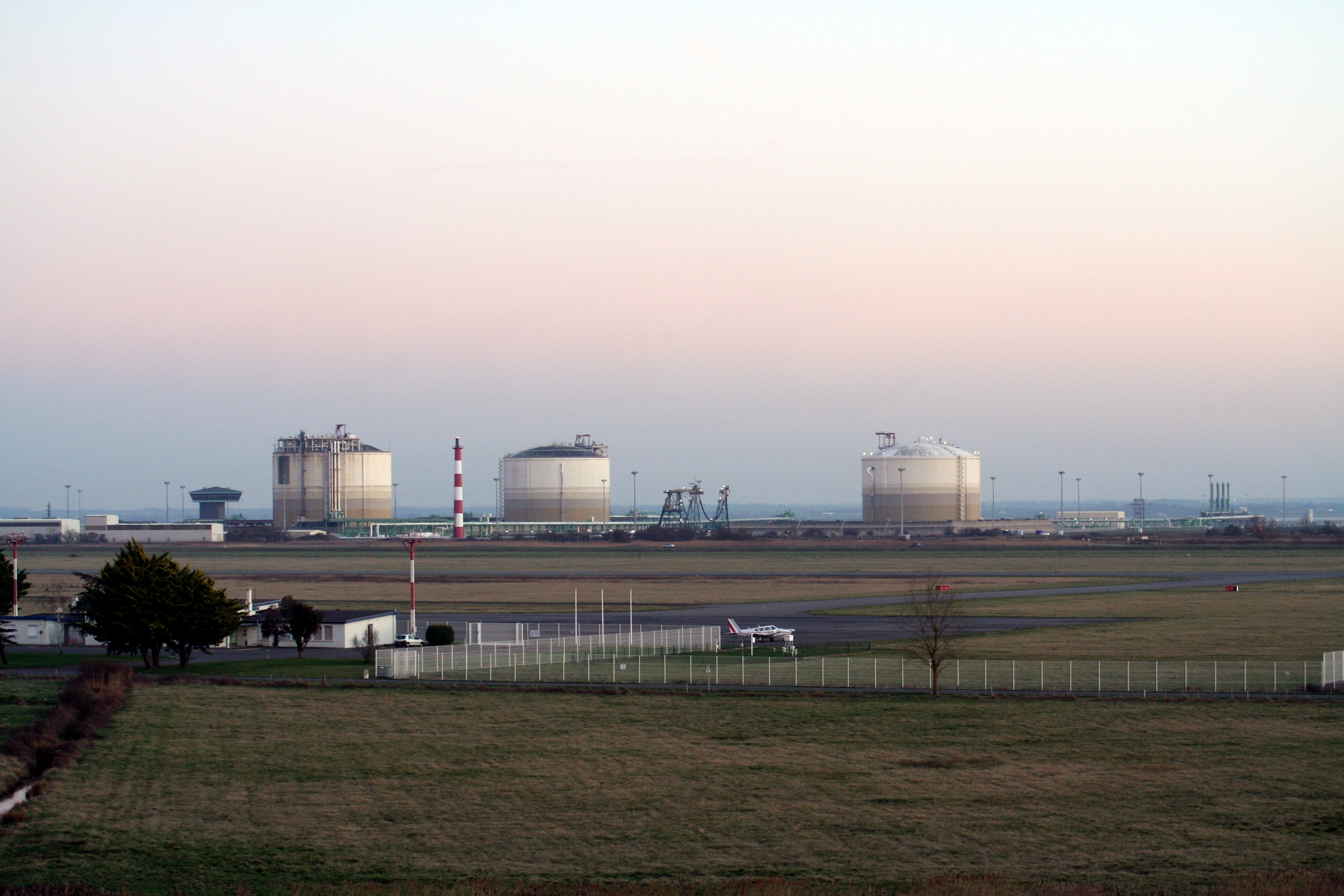
- Saint-Nazaire airport

- Coat of arms
- Location of Montoir-de-Bretagne
- Location within France Location within Pays de la Loire
- Coordinates: 47°19′45″N 2°08′52″W
- Country: France
- Region: Pays de la Loire
- Department: Loire-Atlantique
- Arrondissement: Saint-Nazaire
- Canton: Saint-Nazaire-2
- Intercommunality: CA Région Nazairienne et Estuaire

Government
  - Mayor (2020–2026): Thierry Noguet
- Area^{1}: 36.79 km^{2} (14.20 sq mi)
- Highest elevation: 15 m (49 ft)
- Lowest elevation: 0 m (0 ft)
- Population (2023): 7,282
  - Density: 197.9/km^{2} (512.6/sq mi)
- Time zone: UTC+01:00 (CET)
  - Summer (DST): UTC+02:00 (CEST)
- INSEE/Postal code: 44103 /44550
- ^{1} French Land Register data, which excludes lakes, ponds, glaciers > 1 km^{2} (0.386 sq mi or 247 acres) and river estuaries.

Montoir-de-Bretagne (French pronunciation: [mɔ̃twaʁ də bʁətaɲ], literally Montoir of Brittany; Gallo: Montoér or Montouèrr, Breton: Mouster-al-Loc'h) is a commune in the Loire-Atlantique department in western France.

== Population ==
The population data given in the table below refer to the commune of Montoir-de-Bretagne in its geography at the given years. In 1913 the commune of Trignac was created from part of Montoir-de-Bretagne, in 1925 Saint-Malo-de-Guersac was created from part of Montoir-de-Bretagne.

Historical population

Year	Pop.	±% p.a.
1793	3,119	—
1800	3,149	+0.14%
1806	3,577	+2.15%
1821	3,871	+0.53%
1831	3,985	+0.29%
1841	4,500	+1.22%
1846	4,572	+0.32%
1851	5,023	+1.90%
1856	5,269	+0.96%
1861	5,388	+0.45%
1866	4,527	−3.42%
1872	4,859	+1.19%
1876	4,603	−1.34%
1881	5,412	+3.29%
1886	7,225	+5.95%
1891	6,942	−0.80%
1896	8,277	+3.58%
1901	10,272	+4.41%

Year	Pop.	±% p.a.
1906	9,756	−1.03%
1911	10,739	+1.94%
1921	6,285	−5.22%
1926	3,860	−9.29%
1931	3,698	−0.85%
1936	3,592	−0.58%
1946	3,681	+0.25%
1954	4,695	+3.09%
1962	4,658	−0.10%
1968	5,171	+1.76%
1975	5,352	+0.49%
1982	5,772	+1.09%
1990	6,585	+1.66%
1999	6,204	−0.66%
2007	6,298	+0.19%
2012	6,950	+1.99%
2017	7,088	+0.39%
2023	7,282	+0.45%

Source: EHESS and INSEE (1968-2023)

== See also ==
- Brière
- Communes of the Loire-Atlantique department
