= Basse-Indre–Saint-Herblain station =

Railway station in Saint-Herblain, France

Coordinates: 47°12′15″N 1°39′37″W

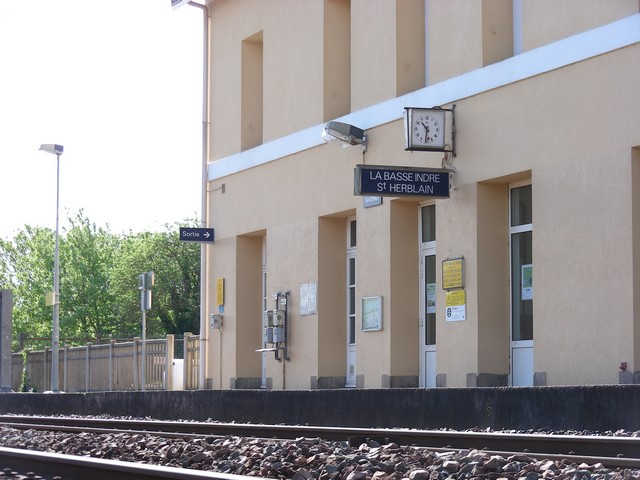
Basse-Indre–Saint-Herblain station

Basse-Indre–Saint-Herblain station (French: Gare de Basse-Indre–Saint-Herblain) is a railway station serving the town Saint-Herblain, Loire-Atlantique department, western France. It is situated on the Tours–Saint-Nazaire railway, between Nantes and Savenay. It is served by local trains (TER Pays de la Loire) to Savenay and Nantes.

Preceding station	TER Pays de la Loire	Following station
Couëron towards Savenay	1bis	Chantenay towards Nantes
