= Thouaré-sur-Loire =

- Commune
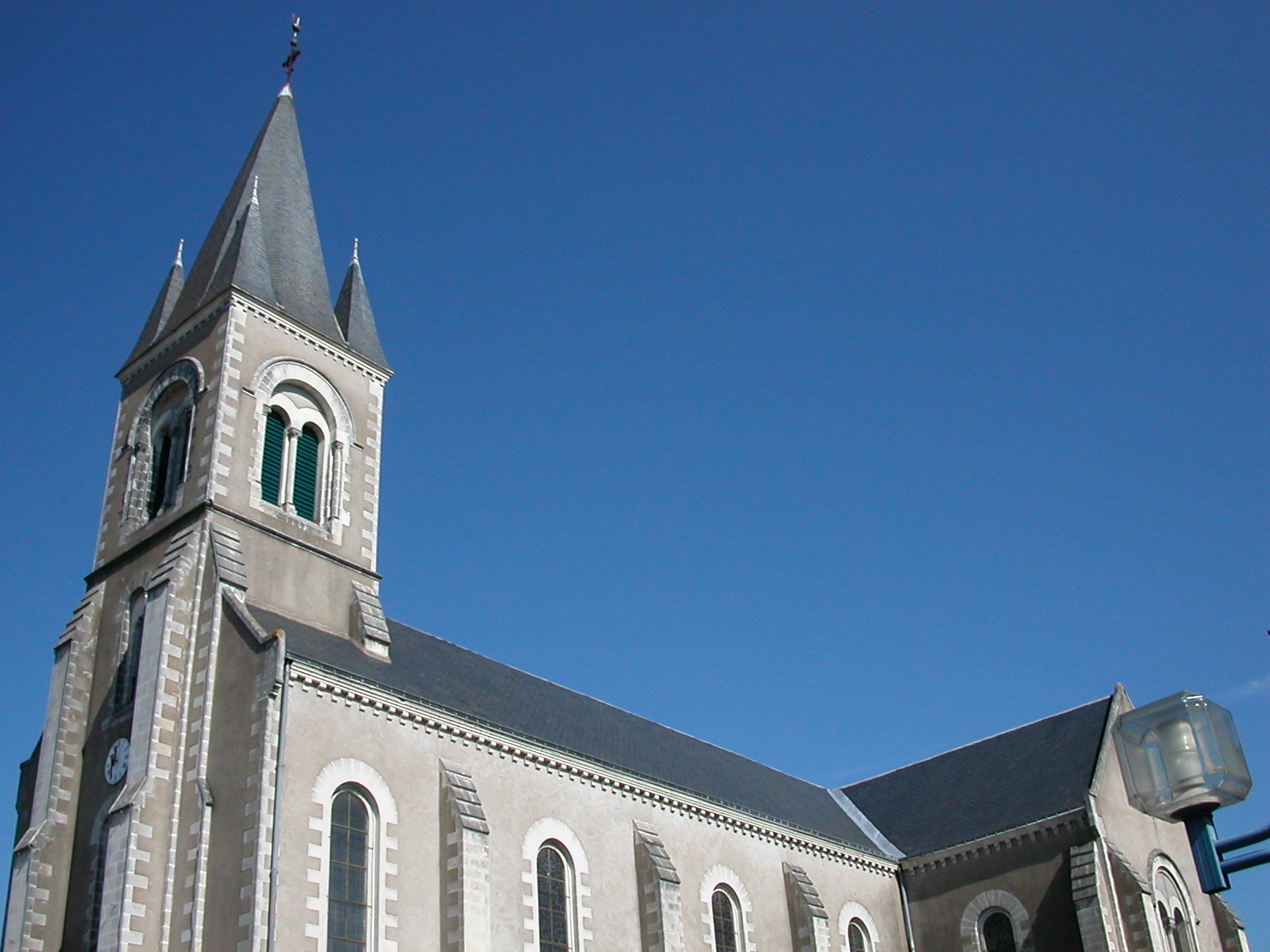
- The church of Saint-Vincent

- Coat of arms
- Location of Thouaré-sur-Loire
- Location within France Location within Pays de la Loire
- Coordinates: 47°16′06″N 1°26′22″W
- Country: France
- Region: Pays de la Loire
- Department: Loire-Atlantique
- Arrondissement: Nantes
- Canton: Carquefou
- Intercommunality: Nantes Métropole

Government
  - Mayor (2020–2026): Martine Oger
- Area^{1}: 12.76 km^{2} (4.93 sq mi)
- Elevation: 13 m (43 ft)
- Highest elevation: 73 m (240 ft)
- Lowest elevation: 1 m (3.3 ft)
- Population (2023): 11,004
  - Density: 862.4/km^{2} (2,234/sq mi)
- Time zone: UTC+01:00 (CET)
  - Summer (DST): UTC+02:00 (CEST)
- INSEE/Postal code: 44204 /44470
- ^{1} French Land Register data, which excludes lakes, ponds, glaciers > 1 km^{2} (0.386 sq mi or 247 acres) and river estuaries.

Thouaré-sur-Loire (French pronunciation: [twaʁe syʁ lwaʁ], literally Thouaré on Loire; Breton: Tarvieg) is a commune in the Loire-Atlantique department in western France.

== Origin of the name ==
The origins of Thouaré are not certain. According to certain hypotheses, the foundation of the city was due to a Roman legionnaire by the name of Taurus or Tauraicus, who had been given a rich villa in the area. Another is that it is due to a Celtic god, worshipped in this part of Gaul, by the name of Taur.

The name of Thouaré appears for the first time in the chart of Louis the Fat in 1123. Its orthography differs due to successive editors: Thoaré, Thoyré, Touaré, Thoaret, Thoairé, then finally Thouaré.

== Population ==
Historical population
Year	Pop.	±% p.a.
1968	1,974	—
1975	2,887	+5.58%
1982	4,505	+6.56%
1990	5,140	+1.66%
1999	6,661	+2.92%
2007	7,407	+1.34%
2012	8,398	+2.54%
2017	10,025	+3.61%
2023	11,004	+1.57%
Source: INSEE

== See also ==
- Communes of the Loire-Atlantique department
