= Besné =

Besné Bèsnét (Gallo) Gwennenid (Breton)
- Commune
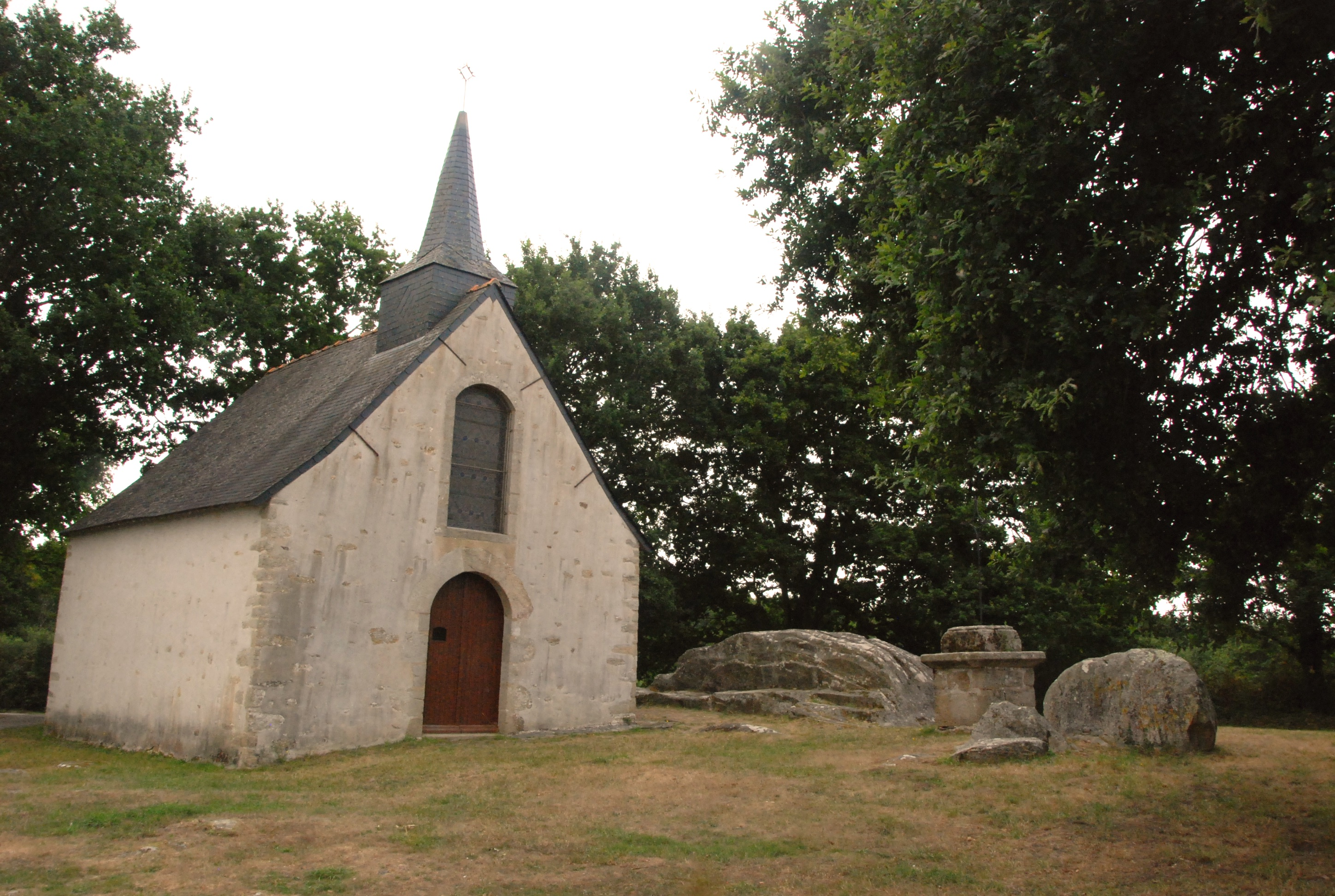

- Coat of arms
- Location of Besné
- Location within France Location within Pays de la Loire
- Coordinates: 47°23′54″N 2°05′24″W
- Country: France
- Region: Pays de la Loire
- Department: Loire-Atlantique
- Arrondissement: Saint-Nazaire
- Canton: Saint-Nazaire-2
- Intercommunality: CA Région Nazairienne et Estuaire

Government
  - Mayor (2020–2026): Sylvie Cauchie
- Area^{1}: 17.54 km^{2} (6.77 sq mi)
- Highest elevation: 16 m (52 ft)
- Lowest elevation: 0 m (0 ft)
- Population (2023): 3,322
  - Density: 189.4/km^{2} (490.5/sq mi)
- Time zone: UTC+01:00 (CET)
  - Summer (DST): UTC+02:00 (CEST)
- INSEE/Postal code: 44013 /44160
- ^{1} French Land Register data, which excludes lakes, ponds, glaciers > 1 km^{2} (0.386 sq mi or 247 acres) and river estuaries.

Besné (French pronunciation: [bɛne]; Gallo: Bèsnét, Breton: Gwennenid) is a commune in the Loire-Atlantique department in western France.

== Population ==
Historical population

Year	Pop.	±% p.a.
1793	850	—
1821	865	+0.06%
1846	1,103	+0.98%
1872	1,227	+0.41%
1901	1,189	−0.11%
1926	1,057	−0.47%
1946	1,067	+0.05%
1962	1,332	+1.40%
1968	1,440	+1.31%

Year	Pop.	±% p.a.
1975	1,636	+1.84%
1982	2,062	+3.36%
1990	2,059	−0.02%
1999	2,031	−0.15%
2007	2,338	+1.78%
2012	2,750	+3.30%
2017	3,051	+2.10%
2023	3,322	+1.43%

Source: EHESS and INSEE (1968-2023)

== See also ==
- Communes of the Loire-Atlantique department
