= Hôtel de Ville, Saint-Herblain =

Town hall in Saint-Herblain, France

Hôtel de Ville
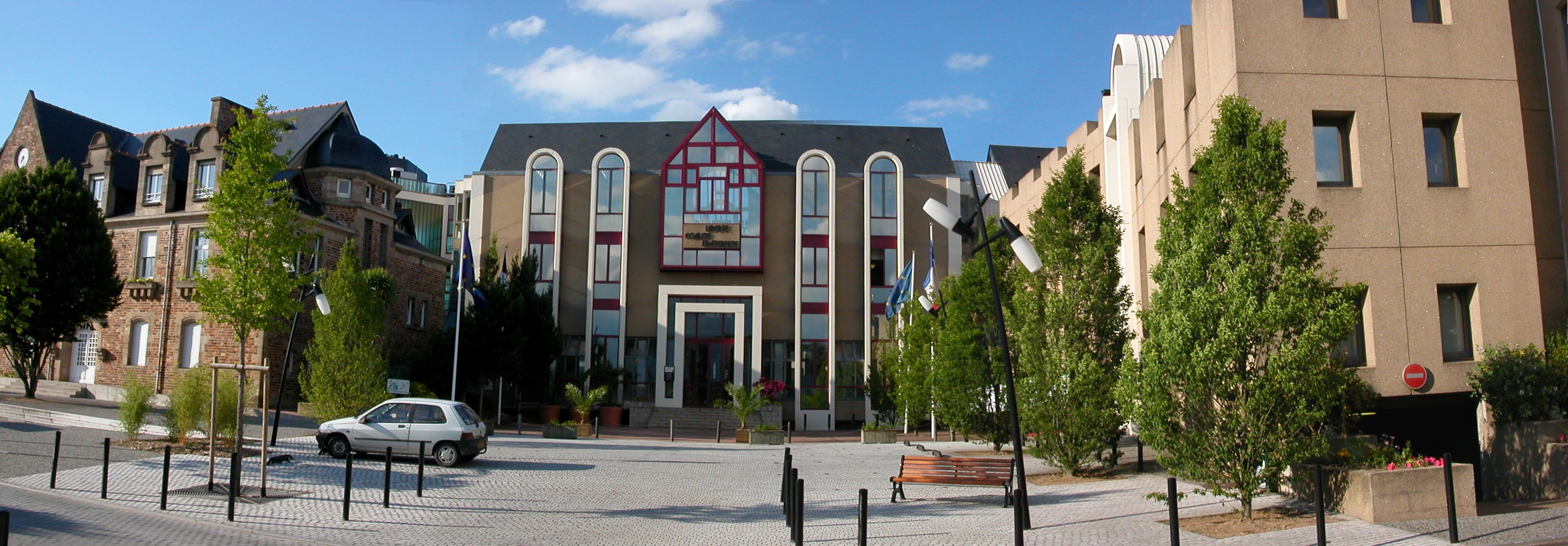
- The main frontage of the Hôtel de Ville in June 2008 (the original building on the left and the 1980s extension in the centre)
- Interactive map of the Hôtel de Ville area

General information
- Type: City hall
- Architectural style: Breton style
- Location: Saint-Herblain, France
- Coordinates: 47.2112°N 1.6483°W
- Completed: 1938

Design and construction
- Architect: Pierre Joëssel

The Hôtel de Ville (French pronunciation: [otɛl də vil], City Hall) is a municipal building in Saint-Herblain, Loire-Atlantique, in western France, standing on Rue de l'Hôtel de Ville.

== History ==
Following the French Revolution, very few of the early mayors were from Saint-Herblain or the surrounding villages: most of them were appointed rather than elected and they took office because they held property in the area. This situation changed when Eugène Charles Maillard became the seigneur of the Château de la Gournerie in 1839 and subsequently had the château restored. Eugène's son, Humbert, became mayor in 1882, and his grandson, also known as Eugène, became mayor in 1911 and, between them, they dominated the office of mayor for over half a century.

In May 1937, the council, still led by the Maillard de la Gournerie family, decided to commission a dedicated town hall. The site they selected was on the north side of what is now Rue de l'Hôtel de Ville. The new building was designed by Pierre Joëssel in the Breton style, built in rubble masonry and was completed in 1938. The design involved an asymmetrical main frontage of four bays facing onto Rue de l'Hôtel de Ville. The left-hand bay featured a pair of windows, which were recessed within arches, on the ground floor; there were three windows, the centre of which benefited from a balcony, on the first floor and there was a gable containing a clock above. The second bay featured a round headed doorway on the ground floor and a tri-partite window on the first floor, while the two bays on the right were fenestrated by segmental headed windows on the ground floor and by casement windows on the first floor. The three bays on the right also featured dormer windows, with semi-circular pediments, at attic level. In the centre of the right-hand side elevation, there was a prominent tower with a dome.

During the Second World War, the town hall was used by German troops as the local Kommandantur (command post). It was placed under the command of a non-commissioned officer, Erich Caumanns, who personally supervised the torture of members of the French Resistance in the basement of the building. He subsequently ordered the execution of eight members of the French Resistance in the courtyard of the town hall on various dates in July 1944. A memorial, intended to commemorate their lives, was unveiled in front of the town hall in May 1980.

A modern extension, located to the east of the original building, was completed in January 1986. The new structures on the north and east sides of a square created a new landscaped space with seats for pedestrians and a few trees. A new Salle des Mariages (wedding hall) was added in 2005 and another modern extension, to the rear of the existing structures, was erected along Boulevard François-Mitterrand and completed in summer 2013. A new war memorial, intended to commemorate the lives of 100 local people who died in the First World War and 50 local people who died in the Second World War, the First Indochina War and the Algerian War, was unveiled in front of the town hall in October 2018.

In April 2023, the council announced proposals to refurbish the whole complex. The refurbishment works included internal improvements to the Salle du Conseil (council chamber), renovation of the façade of the 1980s structure and upgrading the landscaping in the square in front of the building.
