= Canton of Carquefou =

Coordinates: 47.30°N 1.49°W

The canton of Carquefou is an administrative division of the Loire-Atlantique department, western France. Its borders were not modified at the French canton reorganisation which came into effect in March 2015. Its seat is in Carquefou.

It consists of the following communes:

1. Carquefou
2. Mauves-sur-Loire
3. Sainte-Luce-sur-Loire
4. Thouaré-sur-Loire
