= François-Augustin Bridoux =

French engraver

- Born: 26 July 1813; Abbeville, Somme, France
- Died: 9 April 1892 (aged 78); Abbeville, Somme, France
- Occupation: Engraver

François-Augustin Bridoux (1813–1892) was a French engraver. He won the Prix de Rome in 1834.
