= Nantes Metropolis =

Coordinates: 47.2172°N 1.5539°W

Nantes Métropole
- Métropole
- Location within the Loire-Atlantique department
- Country: France
- Region: Pays de la Loire
- Department: Loire-Atlantique
- No. of communes: {{{nbcomm}}}
- Established: 1 January 2015

Government
  - President (2020–2026): Johanna Rolland (PS)
- Area: 523.35 km^{2} (202.07 sq mi)
- Population (2018): 656,275
  - Density: 1,254.0/km^{2} (3,247.8/sq mi)
- Website: www.metropole.nantes.fr

The Nantes Metropolis (French: Nantes Métropole, pronounced [nɑ̃t metʁɔpɔl]) is the métropole, an intercommunal structure, centred on the city of Nantes. It is located in the Loire-Atlantique department, in the Pays de la Loire region, western France. It was created in January 2015, replacing the previous Communauté urbaine de Nantes. Its area is 523.4 km^{2}. Its population was 636,013 in 2018, of which 314,138 in Nantes proper.

The metropolis is a member of the Nantes - Saint-Nazaire and Loire-Bretagne metropolitan clusters, as well as the Eurocities network, of which it chaired the Culture Forum in 2009.

== History ==
The Communauté urbaine de Nantes was founded in 2001. On January 1, 2015, the Metropolis replaced the Urban Community in accordance with a law of January 2014.

== Administration ==
The Metropolitan Council consists of 97 members, one of them being the president, currently Johanna Rolland, the mayor of Nantes.

== Composition ==
The 24 communes of the métropole are:

Commune	Population (2019)	Area (km^{2})	Notes
Basse-Goulaine	9,146	13.74	
Bouaye	8,008	13.83	
Bouguenais	19,903	31.5	
Brains	2,849	15.31	
Carquefou	20,365	43.42	
La Chapelle-sur-Erdre	19,551	33.42	
Couëron	22,309	44,.03	
Indre	4,040	4.72	
Mauves-sur-Loire	3,244	14.75	
La Montagne	6,290	3.64	The smallest commune
Nantes	318,808	65.19	The largest and most populated commune
Orvault	27,209	27.67	
Le Pellerin	5,200	30.65	The least densely populated commune (150 inhabitants/km^{2})
Rezé	42,919	13.78	
Saint-Aignan-Grandlieu	3,954	17.94	
Saint-Herblain	47,715	30.02	
Saint-Jean-de-Boiseau	5,987	11.4	
Saint-Léger-les-Vignes	1,939	6.49	The least populated commune
Sainte-Luce-sur-Loire	15,319	11.45	
Saint-Sébastien-sur-Loire	27,493	11.65	
Sautron	8,478	17.28	
Les Sorinières	8,765	13.02	
Thouaré-sur-Loire	10,482	12.76	
Vertou	25,541	35.68	

Nantes Métropole encompasses only the center of the metropolitan area of Nantes (see infobox at Nantes article for the metropolitan area). Communes further away from the center of the metropolitan area have formed their own intercommunal structures, such as:

- Communauté de communes d'Erdre et Gesvres
- Communauté de communes de Grand-Lieu
- Communauté de communes Sèvre et Loire
- etc.
