= Canton of Saint-Herblain-2 =

Coordinates: 47.22°N 1.61°W

The canton of Saint-Herblain-2 is an administrative division of the Loire-Atlantique department, western France. It was created at the French canton reorganisation which came into effect in March 2015. Its seat is in Saint-Herblain.

It consists of the following communes:

1. Orvault
2. Saint-Herblain (partly)
