= Canton of Saint-Nazaire-1 =

Coordinates: 47.27°N 2.22°W

The canton of Saint-Nazaire-1 is an administrative division of the Loire-Atlantique department, western France. It was created at the French canton reorganisation which came into effect in March 2015. Its seat is in Saint-Nazaire.

It consists of the following communes:

1. Saint-Nazaire (partly)
