= Canton of Rezé-1 =

Coordinates: 47.19°N 1.57°W

The canton of Rezé-1 is an administrative division of the Loire-Atlantique department, western France. It was created at the French canton reorganisation which came into effect in March 2015. Its seat is in Rezé.

It consists of the following communes:

1. Rezé (partly)
2. Bouaye
3. Bouguenais
4. Brains
5. Saint-Aignan-Grandlieu
6. Saint-Léger-les-Vignes
