= Canton of Rezé-2 =

Coordinates: 47.18°N 1.55°W

The canton of Rezé-2 is an administrative division of the Loire-Atlantique department, western France. It was created at the French canton reorganisation which came into effect in March 2015. Its seat is in Rezé.

It consists of the following communes:

1. Rezé (partly)
