= Canton of Saint-Nazaire-2 =

Coordinates: 47.28°N 2.21°W

The canton of Saint-Nazaire-2 is an administrative division of the Loire-Atlantique department, western France. It was created at the French canton reorganisation which came into effect in March 2015. Its seat is in Saint-Nazaire.

It consists of the following communes:

1. Besné
2. Donges
3. Montoir-de-Bretagne
4. Saint-Malo-de-Guersac
5. Saint-Nazaire (partly)
6. Trignac
