= Sainte-Luce-sur-Loire =

- Commune
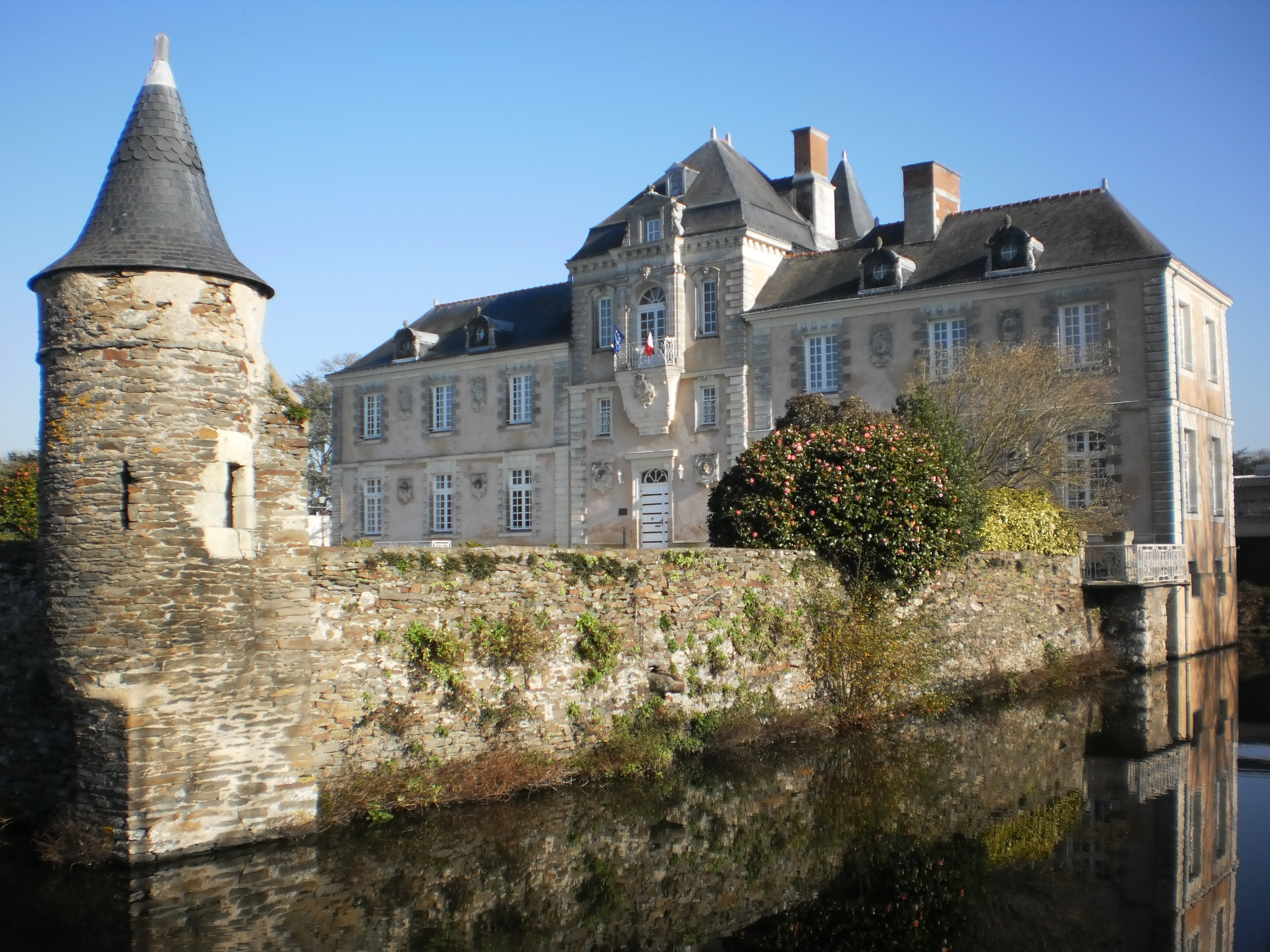
- Château de Chassay

- Coat of arms
- Location of Sainte-Luce-sur-Loire
- Location within France Location within Pays de la Loire
- Coordinates: 47°15′01″N 1°29′08″W
- Country: France
- Region: Pays de la Loire
- Department: Loire-Atlantique
- Arrondissement: Nantes
- Canton: Carquefou
- Intercommunality: Nantes Métropole

Government
  - Mayor (2020–2026): Anthony Descloziers
- Area^{1}: 11.45 km^{2} (4.42 sq mi)
- Highest elevation: 36 m (118 ft)
- Lowest elevation: 2 m (6.6 ft)
- Population (2023): 16,400
  - Density: 1,430/km^{2} (3,710/sq mi)
- Time zone: UTC+01:00 (CET)
  - Summer (DST): UTC+02:00 (CEST)
- INSEE/Postal code: 44172 /44980
- ^{1} French Land Register data, which excludes lakes, ponds, glaciers > 1 km^{2} (0.386 sq mi or 247 acres) and river estuaries.

Sainte-Luce-sur-Loire (French pronunciation: [sɛ̃t lys syʁ lwaʁ], literally Saint Lucy on Loire; Breton: Santez-Lusenn) is a commune in the Loire-Atlantique department in western France. This commune is one of the 24 communes that make up the intercommunality of Nantes Metropolis.

== Population ==
Historical population

| Year | Pop. | ±% p.a. |
|---|---|---|
| 1793 | 890 | — |
| 1800 | 908 | +0.29% |
| 1806 | 909 | +0.02% |
| 1821 | 981 | +0.51% |
| 1831 | 957 | −0.25% |
| 1841 | 1,027 | +0.71% |
| 1846 | 1,024 | −0.06% |
| 1851 | 939 | −1.72% |
| 1856 | 1,045 | +2.16% |
| 1861 | 1,087 | +0.79% |
| 1866 | 1,110 | +0.42% |
| 1872 | 1,045 | −1.00% |
| 1876 | 1,119 | +1.73% |
| 1881 | 1,133 | +0.25% |
| 1886 | 1,122 | −0.19% |
| 1891 | 1,133 | +0.20% |
| 1896 | 1,144 | +0.19% |
| 1901 | 1,148 | +0.07% |

| Year | Pop. | ±% p.a. |
|---|---|---|
| 1906 | 1,193 | +0.77% |
| 1911 | 1,112 | −1.40% |
| 1921 | 1,105 | −0.06% |
| 1926 | 1,116 | +0.20% |
| 1931 | 1,220 | +1.80% |
| 1936 | 1,278 | +0.93% |
| 1946 | 1,417 | +1.04% |
| 1954 | 1,961 | +4.15% |
| 1962 | 2,929 | +5.14% |
| 1968 | 3,420 | +2.62% |
| 1975 | 5,939 | +8.20% |
| 1982 | 8,399 | +5.08% |
| 1990 | 9,648 | +1.75% |
| 1999 | 11,261 | +1.73% |
| 2007 | 11,665 | +0.44% |
| 2012 | 13,452 | +2.89% |
| 2017 | 15,360 | +2.69% |
| 2023 | 16,400 | +1.10% |

Source: EHESS and INSEE (1968-2023)

== See also ==
- Communes of the Loire-Atlantique department
