= Cantons of Nantes =

Coordinates: 47.22°N 1.55°W

The cantons of Nantes are administrative divisions of the Loire-Atlantique department, in western France. Since the French canton reorganisation which came into effect in March 2015, the city of Nantes is subdivided into 7 cantons. Their seat is in Nantes.

== Cantons ==
Name	Population (2019)	Cantonal Code
Canton of Nantes-1	44,152	4411
Canton of Nantes-2	41,990	4412
Canton of Nantes-3	53,323	4413
Canton of Nantes-4	39,225	4414
Canton of Nantes-5	42,874	4415
Canton of Nantes-6	47,551	4416
Canton of Nantes-7	49,693	4417
