= List of windmills in Loire-Atlantique =

A list of windmills in Loire-Atlantique, France,

Location	Name of mill	Type	Built	Notes	Photograph
La Sicaudais, Arthon-en-Retz	Moulin du Bois Haman	Moulin Tour		Moulins-a-Vent (in French)	
Assérac	Moulin de Pont d'Arm				
Avessac	Moulin de Sainte Marie	Moulin Tour		Moulins-a-Vent (in French)	
Avessac	Moulin du Bourg	Moulin Tour		Moulins-a-Vent (in French)	
Avessac	Moulin de Carmargois #1	Moulin Tour		Moulins-a-Vent (in French)	
Avessac	Moulin de Carmargois #2	Moulin Tour		Moulins-a-Vent (in French)	
Avessac	Moulin de Carmargois #3	Moulin Tour		Moulins-a-Vent (in French)	
Barbechat	Moulin de la Boisière	Moulin Tour		Moulins-a-Vent (in French)	
Barbechat	Moulin-Minoterie de la Sangle	Moulin Tour		Moulins-a-Vent (in French)	
Basse-Goulaine	Moulin Soline	Moulin Tour		Moulins-a-Vent (in French)	
Batz-sur-Mer	Moulin de la Falaise; Moulin de la Solitude	Moulin Tour	16th century	CFPPHR (in French); Moulins a Vent (in French)	
Batz-sur-Mer	Moulin de la Masse	Moulin Tour		Moulins-a-Vent (in French)	
Batz-sur-Mer	Moulin de Kermoisan	Moulin Tour		Moulins-a-Vent (in French)	
Batz-sur-Mer	Moulin du Prieuré	Moulin Tour			
Blain	Moulin d'Orgerais	Moulin Tour		Moulins-a-Vent (in French)	
Bouaye	Moulin des Terres Quartrières				
Bouée	Moulin de Bouée	Moulin Tour		Moulins-a-Vent (in French)	
Bouée	Moulin de Rochou	Moulin Tour			
Bourgneuf-en-Retz	Moulin de l'Arzelier; Moulin du Coteau	Moulin Tour		Moulins-a-Vent (in French)	
Bourgneuf en Retz	Moulin de Bourgneuf en Retz	Moulin Tour		Moulins-a-Vent (in French)	
Campbon	Moulin de la Bicane	Moulin Tour	1850	Moulins-a-Vent (in French)	
Carquefou	Moulin du Fay	Moulin Tour	14th century	Moulins-a-Vent (in French)	
Carquefou	Moulin Neuf	Moulin Tour		Moulins-a-Vent (in French)	
Casson	Moulin de la Grohinière	Moulin Tour		Moulins-a-Vent (in French)	
Casson	Le Moulin Neuf #1	Moulin Tour		Moulins-a-Vent (in French)	
Casson	Le Moulin Neuf #2	Moulin Tour		Moulins-a-Vent (in French)	
Châteaubriant	Moulin de la Butte des Ridais	Moulin Tour		Moulins-a-Vent (in French)	
Château-Thébaud	Moulin Chupin	Moulin Tour		Moulins-a-Vent (in French)	
Château-Thébaud	Le Grand Moulin	Moulin Tour		Moulins-a-Vent (in French)	
Château-Thébaud	Moulin Neuf	Moulin Tour		Moulins-a-Vent (in French)	
Chéméré	Moulin de la Motte Hiver	Moulin Tour	1839	Moulins-a-Vent (in French)	
Conquereuil	Moulin du Chêne	Moulin Tour		Moulins-a-Vent (in French)	
Couëron	Moulin de la Garnerais; Moulin de la Gallonière	Moulin Tour		Moulins-a-Vent (in French)	
Couffé	Moulin des Rochettes	Moulin Tour		Moulins-a-Vent (in French)	
Derval	Moulin du Thu	Moulin Tour		Moulins-a-Vent (in French)	
Derval	Moulin de Quibut	Moulin Tour		Ruin; Moulins-a-Vent (in French)	
Donges	Moulin Neuf	Moulin Tour		Moulins-a-Vent (in French)	
Grandchamps-des-Fontaines	Moulin Grimaud	Moulin Tour		Moulins-a-Vent (in French)	
Guémené-Penfao	Moulin du Pont d'Esnault	Moulin Tour		Moulins-a-Vent (in French)	
Guémené-Penfao	Moulin de la Grenouillère	Moulin Tour	Late 18th or early 19th century	Moulins-a-Vent (in French)	
Guémené-Penfao	Moulin Plaisance	Moulin Tour		Moulins-a-Vent (in French)	
Guérande	Moulin de Crémeur; Moulin du Diable	Moulin Tour	Late 15th or early 16th century	CFPPHR (in French); Moulins a Vent	
Guérande	Moulin de Colveux	Moulin Tour		Moulins-a-Vent (in French)	
Guérande	Moulin de Beaulieu	Moulin Tour		Moulins-a-Vent (in French)	
Guérande	Moulin de Drézeux	Moulin Tour		Moulins-a-Vent (in French)	
Guérande	Moulin de Bouzeray	Moulin Tour			
Guérande	Moulin de Trévaly	Moulin Tour			
Guérande	Moulin de Saillé	Moulin Tour			
Herbignac	Moulin a Herbignac	Moulin Tour		Moulins-a-Vent (in French)	
Héric	Moulin de la Remaudais	Moulin Tour		Moulins-a-Vent (in French)	
Héric	Moulin du Bois Rivault	Moulin Tour		Moulins-a-Vent (in French)	
Héric	Moulin du Lintin	Moulin Tour		Moulins-a-Vent (in French)	
Héric	Moulin du Perray	Moulin Tour		Moulins-a-Vent (in French)	
Joué-sur-Erdre	Moulin de Bel Air	Moulin Tour	1850	Moulins-a-Vent (in French)	
La Baule-Careil	Moulin de Careil	Moulin Tour		Moulins-a-Vent (in French)	
La Bernerie-en-Retz	Moulin de Doucet	Moulin Tour		Moulins-a-Vent (in French)	
La Boissière-du-Doré	Moulin de l'Aulnaie	Moulin Tour		Moulins-a-Vent (in French)	
La Chapelle-Basse-Mer	Moulin de l'Ile	Moulin Tour		Moulins-a-Vent (in French)	
La Chapelle-Basse-Mer	Moulin des Avenaux	Moulin Tour		Moulins-a-Vent (in French)	
La Chapelle-Basse-Mer	Moulin de l'Auberdière	Moulin Tour		Moulins-a-Vent (in French)	
La Chapelle-Basse-Mer	Moulin de Beauchêne	Moulin Tour		Moulins-a-Vent (in French)	
La Chapelle-Basse-Mer	Moulin de Bois Méchine	Moulin Tour		Moulins-a-Vent (in French)	
La Chapelle-Basse-Mer	Moulin de la Fuie	Moulin Tour		Moulins-a-Vent (in French)	
La Chapelle-Basse-Mer	Moulin de Bois Fillaud	Moulin Tour		Moulins-a-Vent (in French)	
La Bonne Vierge, La Chapelle-Basse-Mer	Moulin des Rochelles	Moulin Tour		Moulins-a-Vent (in French)	
Le Guinaud, La Chapelle-Basse-Mer	Moulin à Claire Fontaine	Moulin Tour		Moulins-a-Vent (in French)	
La Chapelle-Basse-Mer	Moulin du Route de Mauves	Moulin Tour		Moulins-a-Vent (in French)	
La Chapelle-Heulin	Moulin des Bois	Moulin Tour		Moulins-a-Vent (in French)	
La Chapelle-sur-Erdre	Moulin des Crétinières	Moulin Tour		Moulins-a-Vent (in French)	
La Chapelle-sur-Erdre	Moulin de Haut Vigneau	Moulin Tour		Moulins-a-Vent (in French)	
La Haie-Fouassière	Moulin du Briel	Moulin Tour		Moulins-a-Vent (in French)	
La Haie-Fouassière	Moulin du Briel	Moulin Cavier		Moulins-a-Vent (in French)	
La Haie-Fouassière	Moulin des Ratelles	Moulin Tour		Moulins-a-Vent (in French)	
La Haie-Fouassière	Moulin de la Faubretière	Moulin Tour		Moulins-a-Vent (in French)	
La Marne	Moulin de la Chollerie	Moulin Tour		Moulins-a-Vent (in French)	
La Plaine-sur-Mer	Moulin de la Guerche	Moulin Tour		Moulins-a-Vent (in French)	
La Plaine-sur-Mer	Moulin Tillac	Moulin Tour		Moulins-a-Vent (in French)	
La Turballe	Moulin de Kerbroué	Moulin Tour		Moulins-a-Vent (in French)	
La Turballe	Moulin de Kerhuel	Moulin Tour	Early 19th century	Moulins-a-Vent (in French)	
Le Cellier	Moulin de la Vignette #1	Moulin Tour		Moulins-a-Vent (in French)	
Le Cellier	Moulin de la Vignette #2	Moulin Tour		Moulins-a-Vent (in French)	
Le Clion-sur-Mer	Moulin de la Jarrie	Moulin Tour		Moulins-a-Vent (in French)	
Le Croisic	Moulin de Bauvran	Moulin Tour			
Le Landreau	Moulin de Beauchêne	Moulin Tour		Moulins-a-Vent (in French)	
Le Landreau	Moulin des Cossardières	Moulin Tour			
Le Loroux-Botterau	Moulin de Pé	Moulin Tour		Moulins-a-Vent (in French)	
Le Loroux-Botterau	Moulin Calvaire	Moulin Tour		Moulins-a-Vent (in French)	
Le Loroux-Botterau	Moulin de la Charterie	Moulin Tour		Moulins-a-Vent (in French)	
Le Loroux-Botterau	Moulin du Douet Rouaud	Moulin Tour		Moulins-a-Vent (in French)	
Le Loroux-Botterau	Moulin Brûlé	Moulin Tour		Moulins-a-Vent (in French)	
Le Loroux-Botterau	Moulin des Landes	Moulin Tour		Moulins-a-Vent (in French)	
Le Loroux-Botterau	Moulin de la Landelle	Moulin Tour		Moulins-a-Vent (in French)	
Le Loroux-Botterau	Moulin de la Braudière	Moulin Tour		Moulins-a-Vent (in French)	
Le Loroux-Botterau	Moulin de Berrière	Moulin Tour		Moulins-a-Vent (in French)	
Le Pouliguen	Moulin de Codan				
Les Moutiers-en-Retz	Moulin des Tréans	Moulin Tour		Moulins-a-Vent (in French)	
Les Sorinières	Moulin Lambert	Moulin Tour		Moulins-a-Vent (in French)	
Les Sorinières	Moulin des Landes	Moulin Tour		Moulins-a-Vent (in French)	
Maisdon-sur-Sèvre	Moulin de la Gustais	Moulin Tour	17th century	Moulins-a-Vent (in French)	
Maisdon-sur-Sèvre	Moulin des Noues	Moulin Tour	19th century	Moulins-a-Vent (in French)	
Maisdon-sur-Sèvre	Moulin du Belvédère	Moulin Tour	1893	Moulins-a-Vent (in French)	
Mauves-sur-Loire	Moulin Neuf	Moulin Tour		Moulins-a-Vent (in French)	
Mauves-sur-Loire	Moulin de la Fosse Garaud	Moulin Tour		Moulins-a-Vent (in French)	
Mésanger	Moulin de la Quéteraie	Moulin Tour	1773	Moulins-a-Vent (in French)	
Mesquer	Moulin de Kerroué				
Missillac	Moulin de Brangolo	Moulin Tour		Moulins-a-Vent (in French)	
Monnières	Moulin de Justice	Moulin Tour		Moulins-a-Vent (in French)	
Monnières	Moulin de la Minière	Moulin Tour		Moulins-a-Vent (in French)	
Monières	Moulin de la Bidère	Moulin Tour		Moulins-a-Vent (in French)	
Mouais	Moulin de les Grées	Moulin Tour		Moulins-a-Vent (in French)	
Nantes	Moulin des Rochettes; Moulin du Tertre	Moulin Tour		Moulins-a-Vent (in French)	
Nantes	Moulin de Nantes	Moulin Tour		Moulins-a-Vent (in French)	
Nort-sur-Erdre	Moulin de la Rochelle #1	Moulin Tour		Moulins-a-Vent (in French)	
Nort-sur-Erdre	Moulin de la Rochelle #2	Moulin Tour		Moulins-a-Vent (in French)	
Nort-sur-Erdre	Moulin Quiheix	Moulin Tour		Moulins-a-Vent (in French)	
Notre-Dame-des-Landes	Moulin de la Croix Perroche	Moulin Tour	1923	Moulins-a-Vent (in French)	
Notre-Dame-des-Landes	Moulin Foucré	Moulin Tour	Late 16th or early 17th century	Moulins-a-Vent (in French)	
Paulx	Moulin du Buffais	Moulin Tour		Moulins-a-Vent (in French)	
Petit-Mars	Moulin des Rochettes	Moulin Tour		Moulins-a-Vent (in French)	
Petit-Mars	Moulin de Launay	Moulin Tour		Moulins-a-Vent (in French)	
Petit-Mars	Moulin à Boisabeau	Moulin Tour	1869	Moulins-a-Vent (in French)	
Petit-Mars	Moulin La Bosse			Moulins-a-Vent (in French)	
Pontchâteau	Moulin de Bilais #1	Moulin Tour		Moulins-a-Vent (in French)	
Pontchâteau	Moulin de Bilais #2	Moulin Tour		Moulins-a-Vent (in French)	
Pornic	Moulin de Pornic #1	Moulin Tour		Moulins-a-Vent (in French)	
Pornic	Moulin de Pornic #2	Moulin Tour		Moulins-a-Vent (in French)	
Pornic	Moulin de Pornic #3	Moulin Tour		Moulins-a-Vent (in French)	
Pornic	Moulin de Pornic #4	Moulin Tour		Moulins-a-Vent (in French)	
Quilly	Moulin de Clos Cassel				
Quimiac	Moulin de Faulx	Moulin Tour		Moulins-a-Vent (in French)	
Rouans	Moulin de la Chesnaie				
Saint-Étienne-de-Montluc	Moulin de Chaugenêt	Moulin Tour		Moulins-a-Vent (in French)	
Saint-Étienne-de-Montluc	Moulin de l'Aubry	Moulin Tour		Moulins-a-Vent (in French)	
Saint-Étienne-de-Montluc	Moulin de St Savin	Moulin Tour		Moulins-a-Vent (in French)	
Saint-Étienne-de-Montluc	Moulin de Bel Air	Moulin Tour		Moulins-a-Vent (in French)	
Saint-Étienne-de-Montluc	Moulin de le Gargouillière	Moulin Tour		Moulins-a-Vent (in French)	
Saint-Étienne-de-Montluc	Moulin des Perrières	Moulin Tour		Moulins-a-Vent (in French)	
Saint-Étienne-de-Montluc	Moulin de la Garenne	Moulin Tour		Moulins-a-Vent (in French)	
Saint-Fiacre-sur-Maine	Moulin des Masses	Moulin Tour		Moulins-a-Vent (in French)	
Saint-Gildas-des-Bois	Moulin de la Cassière	Moulin Tour		Moulins-a-Vent (in French)	
Saint-Herblon	Moulin Grées				
Saint-Hilaire-de-Clisson	Moulin Pointu	Moulin Tour		Moulins-a-Vent (in French)	
Saint-Hilaire-de-Clisson	Moulin Neuf	Moulin Tour		Moulins-a-Vent (in French)	
Saint-Julien-de-Concelles	Moulin du Tue Loup	Moulin Tour		Moulins-a-Vent (in French)	
Saint-Julien-de-Concelles	Moulin de Bregeonnes	Moulin Tour		Moulins-a-Vent (in French)	
Saint-Julien-de-Concelles	Moulin de Pennetrie	Moulin Tour		Moulins-a-Vent (in French)	
Saint-Julien-de-Concelles	Moulin de Quartier des Trois Moulins #1	Moulin Tour		Moulins-a-Vent (in French)	
Saint-Julien-de-Concelles	Moulin de Quartier des Trois Moulins #2	Moulin Tour		Moulins-a-Vent (in French)	
Saint-Lumine-de-Coutais	Moulin de l'Ebaupin	Moulin Tour		Moulins-a-Vent (in French)	
Saint-Lumine-de-Coutais	Moulin du Mémorial des Guerres des Vendée	Moulin Tour		Moulins-a-Vent (in French)	
Saint-Lumine-de-Coutais	Moulins du Bernard			Two mills	
Saint-Lumine-de-Coutais	Moulin de la Pègerie				
Saint-Lyphard	Moulin de Kerbourg; Moulin de la Fée	Moulin Tour		CFPPHR (in French); Moulins-a-Vent (in French)	
Saint-Mars-de-Coutais	Moulin de la Nation	Moulin Tour		Moulins-a-Vent (in French)	
Saint-Mars-du-Désert	Moulin des Places	Moulin Tour		Moulins-a-Vent (in French)	
Saint-Mars-du-Désert	Le Petit Moulin	Moulin Tour		Moulins-a-Vent (in French)	
Saint-Michel-Chef-Chef	Moulin de Beaulieu] Moulin du Bourg	Moulin Tour		Moulins-a-Vent (in French)	
Saint-Père-en-Retz	Moulin de la Hunaudais				
Saint-Père-en-Retz	Moulin Neuf	Moulin Tour		Moulins-a-Vent (in French)	
Saint-Philbert-de-Grand-Lieu	Moulin des Jamonnières; Moulin Brûlé; Moulin Neuf	Moulin Tour		Moulins-a-Vent (in French)	
Saint-Philbert-de-Grand-Lieu	Moulin du Plessix	Moulin Tour		Moulins-a-Vent (in French)	
Saint-Viaud	Moulin de la Ramée				
Saint-Vincent-des-Landes	Moulin du Champ Etienne	Moulin Tour		Moulins-a-Vent (in French)	
Sainte-Pazanne	Moulin de Malessart	Moulin Tour		Moulins-a-Vent (in French)	
Savenay	Moulin de la Pâquelais	Moulin Tour	1545	Moulins-a-Vent (in French)	
Soudan	Moulin de Croc Fer	Moulin Tour		Moulins-a-Vent (in French)	
Sucé-sur-Erdre	Moulin Le Lavoir	Moulin Tour		Moulins-a-Vent (in French)	
Sucé-sur-Erdre	Moulin de la Miltière	Moulin Tour		Moulins-a-Vent (in French)	
Sucé-sur-Erdre	Moulin à Bellevigne; Moulin à la Touche #1	Moulin Tour		Moulins-a-Vent (in French)	
Sucé-sur-Erdre	Moulin à Bellevigne; Moulin à la Touche #2	Moulin Tour		Moulins-a-Vent (in French)	
Treillières	Moulin du Fort l'Evêque	Moulin Tour		Moulins-a-Vent (in French)	
Treillières	Moulin Laurent	Moulin Tour		Moulins-a-Vent (in French)	
Treillières	Moulin des Landes #1	Moulin Tour		Moulins-a-Vent (in French)	
Treillières	Moulin des Landes #2	Moulin Tour		Moulins-a-Vent (in French)	
Treillières	Moulin de Launay Haut	Moulin Tour		Moulins-a-Vent (in French)	
Vallet	Moulin Bondu	Moulin Tour		Moulins-a-Vent (in French)	
Vallet	Moulin de la Charouillère	Moulin Tour		Moulins-a-Vent (in French)	
Vallet	Moulin de Gohaud	Moulin Tour		Moulins-a-Vent (in French)	
Vertou-Portillon	Moulin de l'Herbray	Moulin Tour		Moulins-a-Vent (in French)	
Vertou-Portillon	Moulin de l'Ânerie	Moulin Tour		Moulins-a-Vent (in French)	
Vertou-Portillon	Moulin du Chêne	Moulin Tour		Moulins-a-Vent (in French)	
Vertou-Portillon	Moulin Beautour	Moulin Tour		Moulins-a-Vent (in French)	
Vigneux-de-Bretagne	Moulin de Bel Air	Moulin Tour		Moulins-a-Vent (in French)	
Vigneux-de-Bretagne	Moulin de la Nation	Moulin Tour		Moulins-a-Vent (in French)	
Vigneux-de-Bretagne	Moulin de Malescot	Moulin Tour		Moulins-a-Vent (in French)	
Vigneux-de-Bretagne	Moulin Neuf	Moulin Tour		Moulins-a-Vent (in French)	
Vigneux-de-Bretagne	Moulin de la Joue	Moulin Tour		Moulins-a-Vent (in French)	
