= Saint-Fiacre-sur-Maine =

- Commune
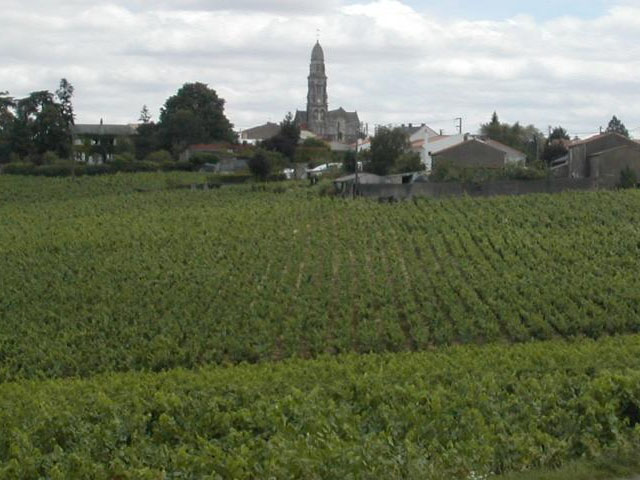

- Coat of arms
- Location of Saint-Fiacre-sur-Maine
- Location within France Location within Pays de la Loire
- Coordinates: 47°08′39″N 1°24′56″W
- Country: France
- Region: Pays de la Loire
- Department: Loire-Atlantique
- Arrondissement: Nantes
- Canton: Vertou
- Intercommunality: CA Clisson Sèvre et Maine Agglo

Government
  - Mayor (2020–2026): Danièle Gadais
- Area^{1}: 5.97 km^{2} (2.31 sq mi)
- Elevation: 53 m (174 ft)
- Highest elevation: 53 m (174 ft)
- Lowest elevation: 2 m (6.6 ft)
- Population (2023): 1,251
  - Density: 210/km^{2} (543/sq mi)
- Time zone: UTC+01:00 (CET)
  - Summer (DST): UTC+02:00 (CEST)
- INSEE/Postal code: 44159 /44690
- ^{1} French Land Register data, which excludes lakes, ponds, glaciers > 1 km^{2} (0.386 sq mi or 247 acres) and river estuaries.

Saint-Fiacre-sur-Maine (French pronunciation: [sɛ̃ fjakʁ syʁ mɛn], literally Saint-Fiacre on Maine; Breton: Sant-Fieg-ar-Mewan) is a commune in the Loire-Atlantique department in western France.

Situated near Nantes, Saint-Fiacre is surrounded by Muscadet vineyards, between the rivers Sèvre Nantaise and Maine.

== Geography ==
Saint-Fiacre-Sur-Maine in Loire-Atlantique

- More of 80% of this commune is covered in vines, more than any other in France. There are more than 30 vine growers.
- The communes bordering Saint-Fiacre-sur-Maine are: Vertou, La Haie-Fouassière, Château-Thébaud and Maisdon-sur-Sèvre.

== History ==
Saint-Hilaire-du-Coing (Sanctus Hilarius del Cugno), was founded in the 6th century, becoming Saint-Fiacre-du-Coing (and Saint-Fiacre) in the 16th century because of pilgrimages to view the saint's statue.

== Twin towns ==
Saint Fiacre sur Maine has a town twinning agreement with

- Echichens (Switzerland) since 1977

== Population ==
Historical population
Year	Pop.	±% p.a.
1968	651	—
1975	761	+2.26%
1982	935	+2.99%
1990	935	+0.00%
1999	996	+0.70%
2007	1,162	+1.95%
2012	1,165	+0.05%
2017	1,207	+0.71%
2023	1,251	+0.60%
Source: INSEE

The inhabitants are known as Fiacrais in French.

== See also ==
- Communes of the Loire-Atlantique department
