= Clisson (disambiguation) =

Clisson is a commune in France.

It may also refer to:

== People ==
- Amaury de Clisson (1304–1347), Breton knight
- Jacqueline Voltaire (born Jacqueline Anne Walter Clisson; 1948–2008), British-born Mexican actress, model and singer
- Jeanne de Clisson (1300–1359), French privateer
- Olivier de Clisson (disambiguation), family of Breton lords

== Places ==
- Château de Clisson, castle
- Clisson Sèvre et Maine Agglo, communauté d'agglomération
- Église Notre Dame (Clisson) French Roman Catholic church
- Saint-Hilaire-de-Clisson, French commune
- Saint-Lumine-de-Clisson, French commune

== Other ==
- Canton of Clisson, administrative division
- Clisson et Eugénie, French novella
