= Arrondissement of Nantes =

Coordinates: 47°13′N 1°34′W

Nantes
- Arrondissement
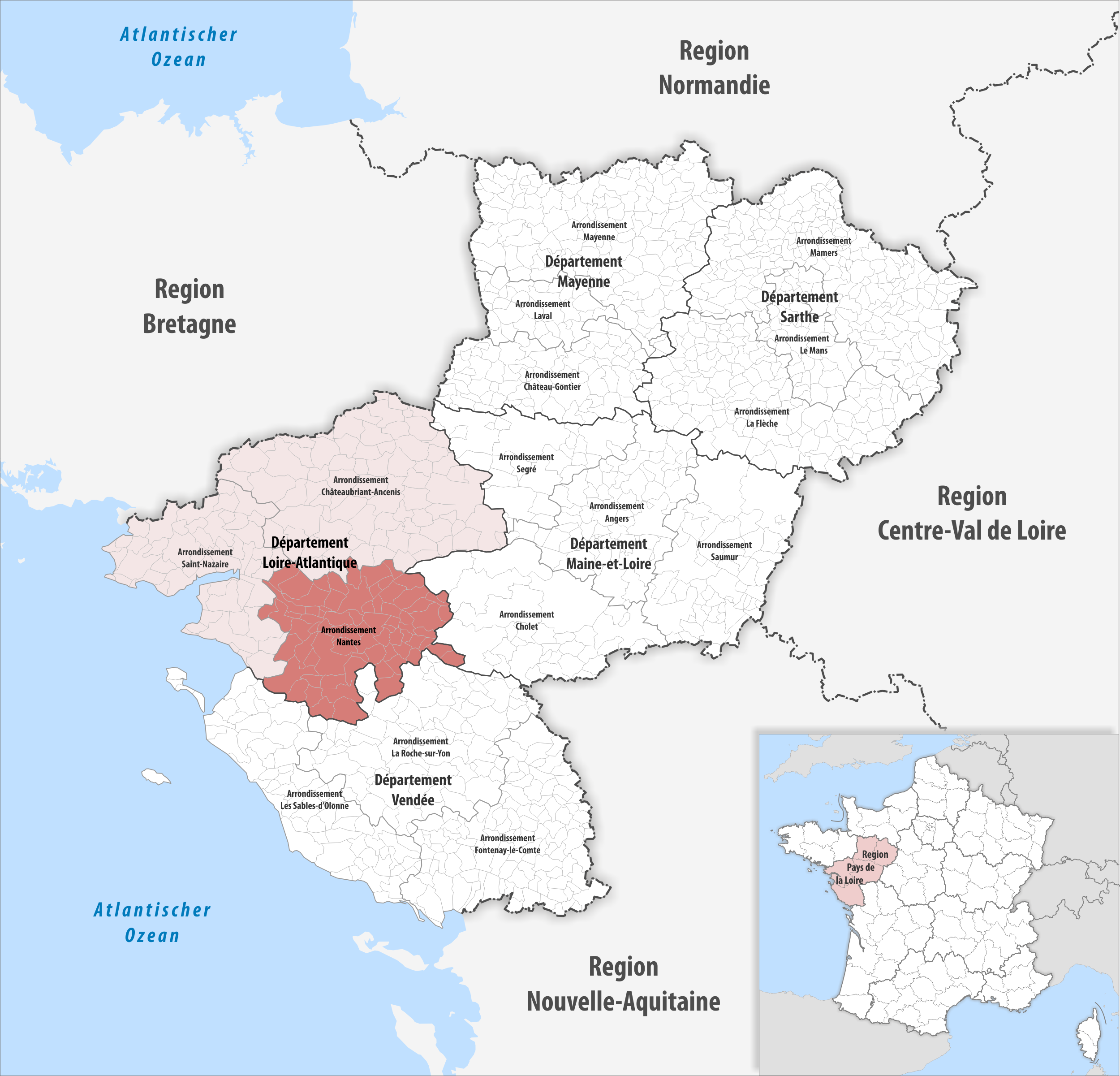
- Location within the region Pays de la Loire
- Country: France
- Region: Pays de la Loire
- Department: Loire-Atlantique
- No. of communes: {{{nbcomm}}}
- Area: 1,958.7 km^{2} (756.3 sq mi)
- Population (2023): 895,982
  - Density: 457.44/km^{2} (1,184.8/sq mi)
- INSEE code: 442

The arrondissement of Nantes is an arrondissement of France in the Loire-Atlantique department in the Pays de la Loire region. It has 76 communes. Its population is 881,045 (2021), and its area is 1,958.7 km^{2} (756.3 sq mi).

== Composition ==
As of January 1, 2024, the Arrondissement of Nantes comprises 76 communes, including notable ones like Nantes, Carquefou, Orvault, and Saint-Herblain. The communes of the arrondissement of Nantes, and their INSEE codes, are:

1. Aigrefeuille-sur-Maine (44002)
2. Basse-Goulaine (44009)
3. Le Bignon (44014)
4. La Boissière-du-Doré (44016)
5. Bouaye (44018)
6. Bouguenais (44020)
7. Boussay (44022)
8. Brains (44024)
9. Carquefou (44026)
10. La Chapelle-Heulin (44032)
11. La Chapelle-sur-Erdre (44035)
12. Château-Thébaud (44037)
13. Cheix-en-Retz (44039)
14. La Chevrolière (44041)
15. Clisson (44043)
16. Corcoué-sur-Logne (44156)
17. Cordemais (44045)
18. Couëron (44047)
19. Divatte-sur-Loire (44029)
20. Geneston (44223)
21. Gétigné (44063)
22. Gorges (44064)
23. La Haie-Fouassière (44070)
24. Haute-Goulaine (44071)
25. Indre (44074)
26. Le Landreau (44079)
27. Legé (44081)
28. La Limouzinière (44083)
29. Le Loroux-Bottereau (44084)
30. Machecoul-Saint-Même (44087)
31. Maisdon-sur-Sèvre (44088)
32. La Marne (44090)
33. Mauves-sur-Loire (44094)
34. Monnières (44100)
35. La Montagne (44101)
36. Montbert (44102)
37. Mouzillon (44108)
38. Nantes (44109)
39. Orvault (44114)
40. Le Pallet (44117)
41. Paulx (44119)
42. Le Pellerin (44120)
43. La Planche (44127)
44. Pont-Saint-Martin (44130)
45. Port-Saint-Père (44133)
46. La Regrippière (44140)
47. La Remaudière (44141)
48. Remouillé (44142)
49. Rezé (44143)
50. Rouans (44145)
51. Saint-Aignan-Grandlieu (44150)
52. Saint-Colomban (44155)
53. Sainte-Luce-sur-Loire (44172)
54. Sainte-Pazanne (44186)
55. Saint-Étienne-de-Mer-Morte (44157)
56. Saint-Étienne-de-Montluc (44158)
57. Saint-Fiacre-sur-Maine (44159)
58. Saint-Herblain (44162)
59. Saint-Hilaire-de-Clisson (44165)
60. Saint-Jean-de-Boiseau (44166)
61. Saint-Julien-de-Concelles (44169)
62. Saint-Léger-les-Vignes (44171)
63. Saint-Lumine-de-Clisson (44173)
64. Saint-Lumine-de-Coutais (44174)
65. Saint-Mars-de-Coutais (44178)
66. Saint-Philbert-de-Grand-Lieu (44188)
67. Saint-Sébastien-sur-Loire (44190)
68. Sautron (44194)
69. Les Sorinières (44198)
70. Le Temple-de-Bretagne (44203)
71. Thouaré-sur-Loire (44204)
72. Touvois (44206)
73. Vallet (44212)
74. Vertou (44215)
75. Vieillevigne (44216)
76. Vue (44220)

== History ==
The arrondissement of Nantes was created in 1800. In 1926, it absorbed the territory of the dissolved Arrondissement of Ancenis, which was later reestablished in 1943. In January 2017 it lost four communes to the new arrondissement of Châteaubriant-Ancenis.

As a result of the reorganisation of the cantons of France which came into effect in 2015, the borders of the cantons are no longer related to the borders of the arrondissements. The cantons of the arrondissement of Nantes were, as of January 2015:

1. Aigrefeuille-sur-Maine
2. Bouaye
3. Carquefou
4. La Chapelle-sur-Erdre
5. Clisson
6. Legé
7. Le Loroux-Bottereau
8. Machecoul
9. Nantes-1
10. Nantes-2
11. Nantes-3
12. Nantes-4
13. Nantes-5
14. Nantes-6
15. Nantes-7
16. Nantes-8
17. Nantes-9
18. Nantes-10
19. Nantes-11
20. Orvault
21. Le Pellerin
22. Rezé
23. Saint-Étienne-de-Montluc
24. Saint-Herblain-Est
25. Saint-Herblain-Ouest-Indre
26. Saint-Philbert-de-Grand-Lieu
27. Vallet
28. Vertou
29. Vertou-Vignoble
