= Gétigné =

Gétigné Jestniyaé (Gallo) Yestinieg (Breton)
- Commune
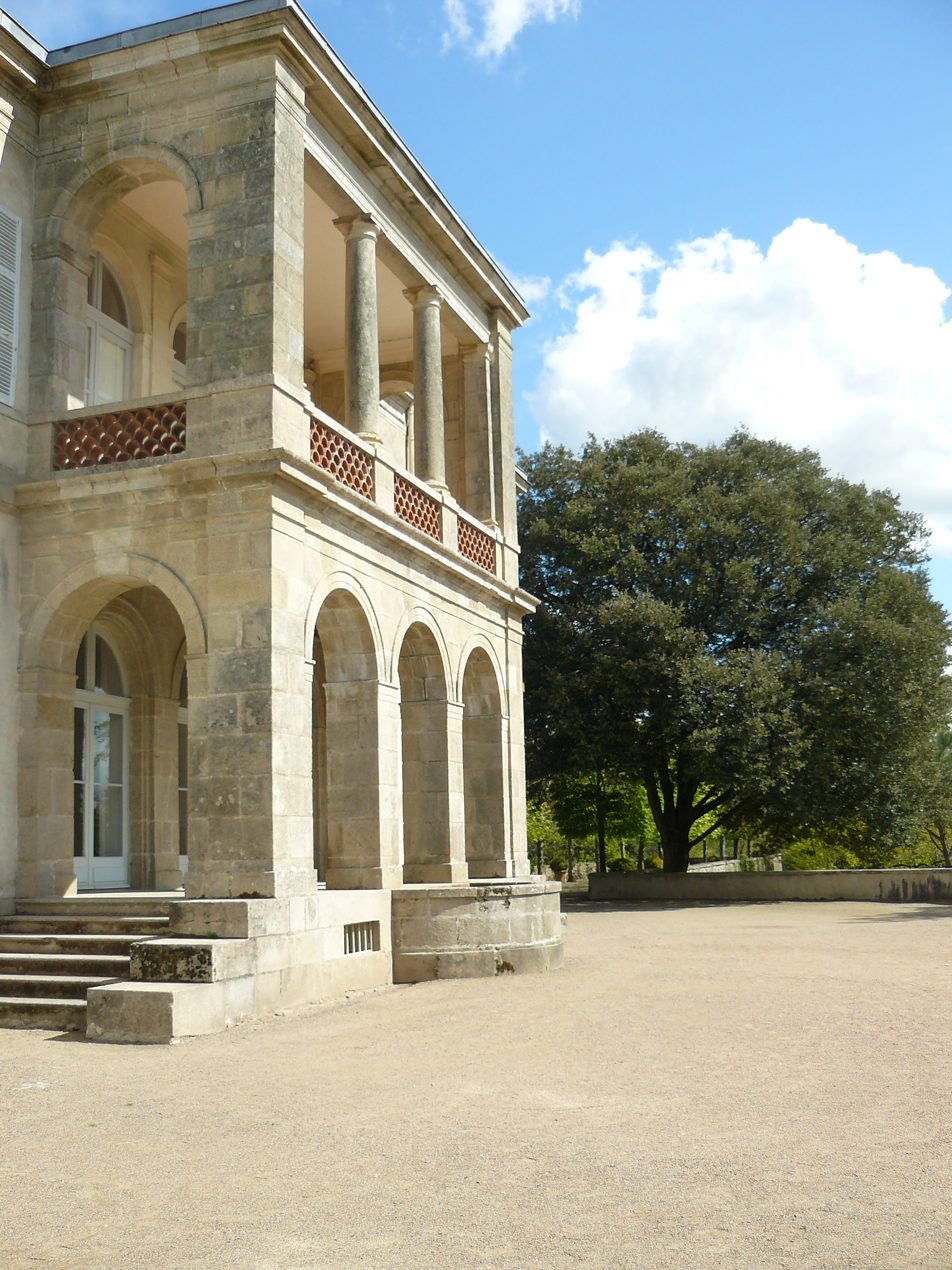
- Villa Garenne Lemot

- Coat of arms
- Location of Gétigné
- Location within France Location within Pays de la Loire
- Coordinates: 47°04′35″N 1°14′54″W
- Country: France
- Region: Pays de la Loire
- Department: Loire-Atlantique
- Arrondissement: Nantes
- Canton: Clisson
- Intercommunality: CA Clisson Sèvre et Maine Agglo

Government
  - Mayor (2020–2026): François Guillot
- Area^{1}: 23.97 km^{2} (9.25 sq mi)
- Highest elevation: 97 m (318 ft)
- Lowest elevation: 13 m (43 ft)
- Population (2023): 3,883
  - Density: 162.0/km^{2} (419.6/sq mi)
- Time zone: UTC+01:00 (CET)
  - Summer (DST): UTC+02:00 (CEST)
- INSEE/Postal code: 44063 /44190
- ^{1} French Land Register data, which excludes lakes, ponds, glaciers > 1 km^{2} (0.386 sq mi or 247 acres) and river estuaries.

Gétigné (French pronunciation: [ʒetiɲe]; Gallo: Jestniyaé, Breton: Yestinieg) is a commune in the department of Loire-Atlantique in the Pays de la Loire region in western France.

It was part of the Brittany-Poitou Marches, and is located in the Nantes vineyard. It forms with three contiguous communes the urban unit of Clisson.

== Geography ==
The neighboring municipalities of Gétigné are Clisson and Boussay in Loire-Atlantique, Sèvremoine in Maine-et-Loire, and Cugand in Vendée. Gétigné occupies an indentation of Loire-Atlantique between Vendée and Maine-et-Loire.

== History ==
The parish of Gétigné was founded in the Middle Ages around the twelfth century. In 1409, Gétigné joined the Brittany-Poitou Marches. Its crossroads of Anjou, Brittany and Poitou contribute to the economic and military development of the parish. The two rivers Moine and Sèvre saw the development of activities related to the use of hydropower with the presence of many mills.

Since the Middle Ages, Gétigné has a church Sainte Radegonde near an abbey of the same name. The castle of La Roche is built by the lords of Clisson (including Olivier II) around the fourteenth century. The castle is bought in 1461 by Marguerite d'Orléans, wife of Richard d'Étampes for his son, the Duke of Brittany Francis II.

== Population ==
Historical population

Year	Pop.	±% p.a.
1793	3,000	—
1821	1,673	−2.06%
1846	2,354	+1.38%
1872	2,195	−0.27%
1901	2,225	+0.05%
1926	1,852	−0.73%
1946	1,678	−0.49%
1962	1,946	+0.93%
1968	2,007	+0.52%

Year	Pop.	±% p.a.
1975	2,274	+1.80%
1982	2,749	+2.75%
1990	2,912	+0.72%
1999	3,076	+0.61%
2007	3,325	+0.98%
2012	3,499	+1.03%
2017	3,669	+0.95%
2023	3,883	+0.95%

Source: EHESS and INSEE (1968-2023)

== Climate ==
The climate of Loire-Atlantique is temperate oceanic. The influence of this climate is largely facilitated by the Loire estuary and the absence of significant elevation. The winters are mild (min -10 °C / max 10 °C) and rainy and the summers are relatively beautiful and mild, too (min 17 °C / max 35 °C). The rains are frequent but not very intense. The annual rainfall is about 820 mm and can vary greatly from year to year. Snowfall is relatively rare.

== International relations ==
Gétigné is twinned with Alatri in Italy.

== See also ==
- Communes of the Loire-Atlantique department
