= Aigrefeuille-sur-Maine =

Aigrefeuille-sur-Maine Aègerfoeylh (Gallo) Kelenneg-ar-Mewan (Breton)
- Commune
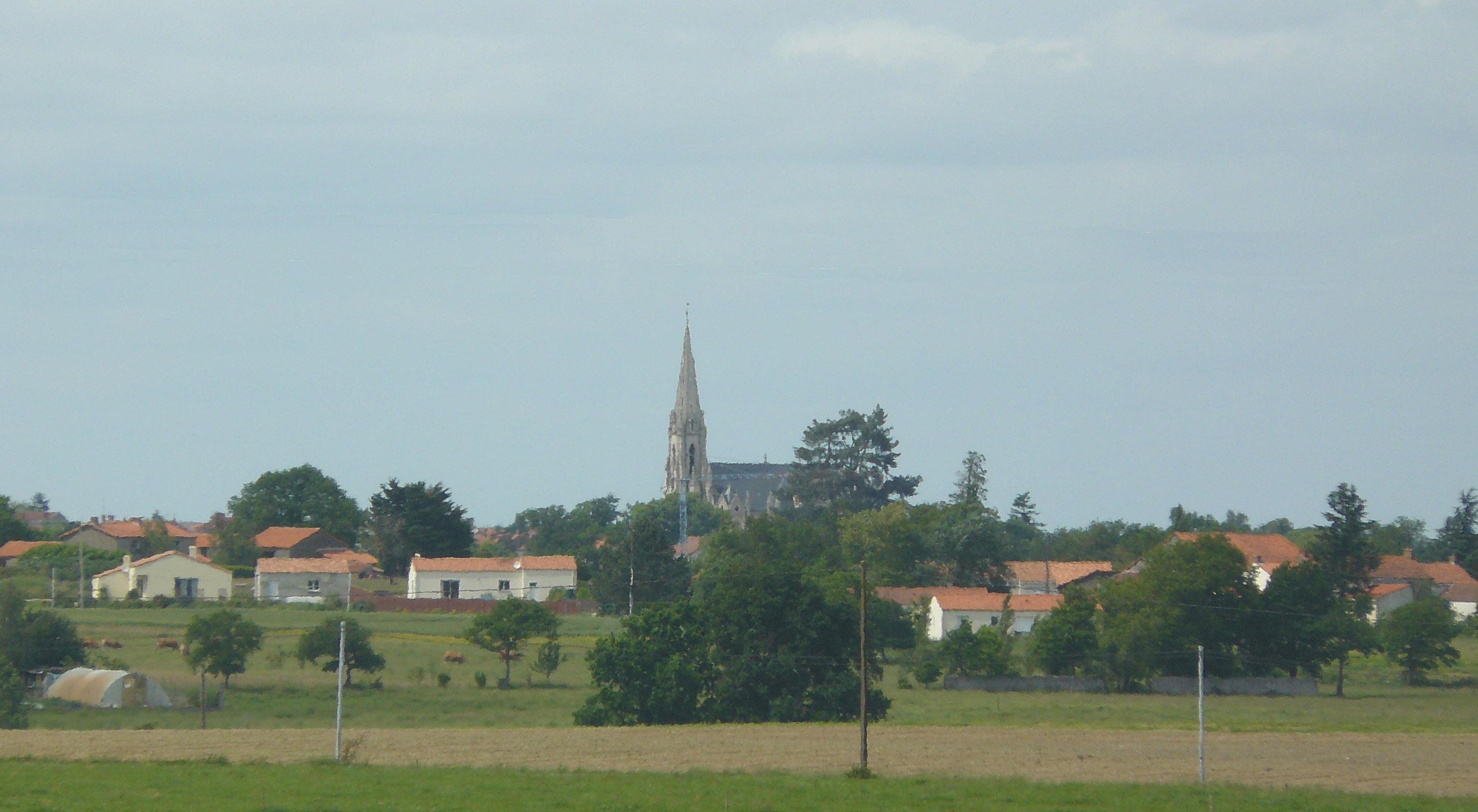

- Coat of arms
- Location of Aigrefeuille-sur-Maine
- Location within France Location within Pays de la Loire
- Coordinates: 47°04′39″N 1°23′57″W
- Country: France
- Region: Pays de la Loire
- Department: Loire-Atlantique
- Arrondissement: Nantes
- Canton: Clisson
- Intercommunality: CA Clisson Sèvre et Maine Agglo

Government
  - Mayor (2020–2026): Jean-Guy Cornu
- Area^{1}: 14.58 km^{2} (5.63 sq mi)
- Highest elevation: 56 m (184 ft)
- Lowest elevation: 2 m (6.6 ft)
- Population (2023): 4,156
  - Density: 285.0/km^{2} (738.3/sq mi)
- Time zone: UTC+01:00 (CET)
  - Summer (DST): UTC+02:00 (CEST)
- INSEE/Postal code: 44002 /44140
- ^{1} French Land Register data, which excludes lakes, ponds, glaciers > 1 km^{2} (0.386 sq mi or 247 acres) and river estuaries.

Aigrefeuille-sur-Maine (French pronunciation: [ɛɡʁəfœj syʁ mɛn], literally Aigrefeuille on Maine; Gallo: Aègerfoeylh, Breton: Kelenneg-ar-Mewan) is a commune in the Loire-Atlantique department in western France.

== Population ==
Historical population

Year	Pop.	±% p.a.
1793	1,500	—
1821	1,260	−0.62%
1846	1,422	+0.48%
1872	1,485	+0.17%
1901	1,310	−0.43%
1926	1,102	−0.69%
1946	1,065	−0.17%
1962	1,076	+0.06%
1968	1,280	+2.94%

Year	Pop.	±% p.a.
1975	1,489	+2.18%
1982	1,829	+2.98%
1990	1,987	+1.04%
1999	2,151	+0.89%
2007	2,734	+3.04%
2012	3,414	+4.54%
2017	3,936	+2.89%
2023	4,156	+0.91%

Source: EHESS and INSEE (1968-2023)

== See also ==
- Communes of the Loire-Atlantique department
