= Boussay =

Boussay is the name of the following communes in France:

- Boussay, Indre-et-Loire, in the Indre-et-Loire department
- Boussay, Loire-Atlantique, in the Loire-Atlantique department
