= Keelby =

Village and civil parish in the West Lindsey district of Lincolnshire, England

Coordinates: 53.571078°N 0.247825°W

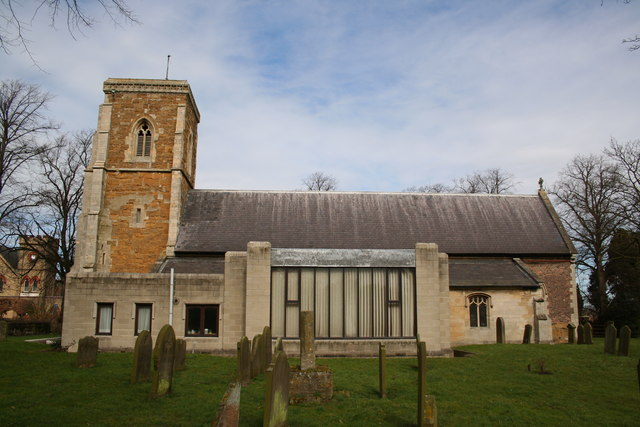
- Church of St Batholomew, Keelby

- Location within Lincolnshire
- Population: 2,226 (2021)
- OS grid reference: TA161097
  - London: 140 mi (230 km) S
- District: West Lindsey
- Shire county: Lincolnshire
- Region: East Midlands
- Country: England
- Sovereign state: United Kingdom
- Post town: Grimsby
- Postcode district: DN41
- Dialling code: 01469
- Police: Lincolnshire
- Fire: Lincolnshire
- Ambulance: East Midlands
- UK Parliament: Gainsborough

Keelby is a village and civil parish in the West Lindsey district of Lincolnshire, England, on the A18, 6 miles (10 km) west from the seaport of Grimsby and 4 miles (6 km) east from the local Humberside Airport, with close access to the A180 to the north, and M180 to the west.

In the 2001 Census it had a population of 2,172, comprising 48.6% males, and 51.4% females. The population at the 2021 census (including Brocklesby) was 2,226, comprising 47.4% males, and 52.6% females.

Keelby is listed in the Domesday Book as "Chelebi" or "Chilebi". A place name ending in "-by" generally indicates that the town or village was a primary Viking settlement.

Keelby has a tennis court, bowling green, park, primary school, guest house and a war memorial, a Mace and a Spar store, and two public houses, the King's Head and the Nag's Head. Religious sites are the Church of England St Bartholomew's Church and a Methodist chapel.

Keelby once had a village pond situated at the junction of Pelham Crescent and Mill Lane, however this was filled in during the 1950s.

There is a football club with adult and junior teams. The village cricket club, reformed in 1975 after a 10-year break, plays in the Lincolnshire League, the Grimsby Midweek League and the East Lindsey Sunday League. Matches were played on the village green until 2009 before moving to a new multi-purpose sports complex on the edge of the village in 2010.

Keelby is within the catchment area of three secondary schools, Healing Comprehensive, Caistor Yarborough, and Caistor Grammar School.

The village was struck by an F1/T2 tornado on 23 November 1981, as part of the record-breaking nationwide tornado outbreak on that day.

Keelby has been twinned with Maisdon-sur-Sèvre, a village in western France, since 1990. There is a street in the French village named after Keelby, Allée de Keelby.
