= Musée de la chanson française =

Museum of the French chanson
- Musée de la chanson française
- Location within France
- Established: 24 June 1995
- Location: 8 rue Paul Joyau, La Planche
- Coordinates: 47°1′0.307″N 1°26′12.36″W
- Type: music museum
- Collections: about French music
- Website: laplanche.fr/fr/rb/1759994/le-musee-de-la-chanson-francaise

The Musée de la chanson française is a museum in La Planche, Loire-Atlantique, France. It is dedicated to the chanson (songs in French style) and the musicians that created and sang them.

== History ==
The museum was founded in 1995 with the help of the former maire of La Planche, Lucien Richard (fr). On 24 June of that year it was inaugurated by Michel Boschat, the subprefect of Loire-Atlantique. In 1998 the name Musée de la chanson française was officially deposited at the National Institute of Industrial Property. The goal of the museum is to remember the artists that have established the heritage of the chanson.

The museum is located in an old chapel of a retirement home in La Planche. The retirement home was closed in 1991. The idea to locate it in this chapel, came in 1992 at a meeting between Maurice Lecorps, the president of the Musidora Association, and the singer Serge Urso. Not far from the chapel, in Saint-Philbert-de-Grand-Lieu, the Musidora Association annually organized the regional contest of French chansons.

== Collection ==
The museum exhibits its large collection in the nave of the chapel. A variety of pieces is exposed in display cabinets and on the walls. The museum shows a great number of records of wax and vinyl, golden and platinum records, photographs, posters, books, sculptures, and various audio players, including a jukebox and a barrel organ. The museum possesses of some rare material, like posters that have never been published and signed record covers. The oldest record in the museum dates from 1850.

== See also ==
- List of museums in France
- List of music museums
