= Canton of Saint-Sébastien-sur-Loire =

Coordinates: 47.20°N 1.50°W

The canton of Saint-Sébastien-sur-Loire is an administrative division of the Loire-Atlantique department, western France. It was created at the French canton reorganisation which came into effect in March 2015. Its seat is in Saint-Sébastien-sur-Loire.

It consists of the following communes:

1. Basse-Goulaine
2. Haute-Goulaine
3. Saint-Sébastien-sur-Loire
