= Gorges, Loire-Atlantique =

Gorges Gorj (Gallo) Gored (Breton)
- Commune
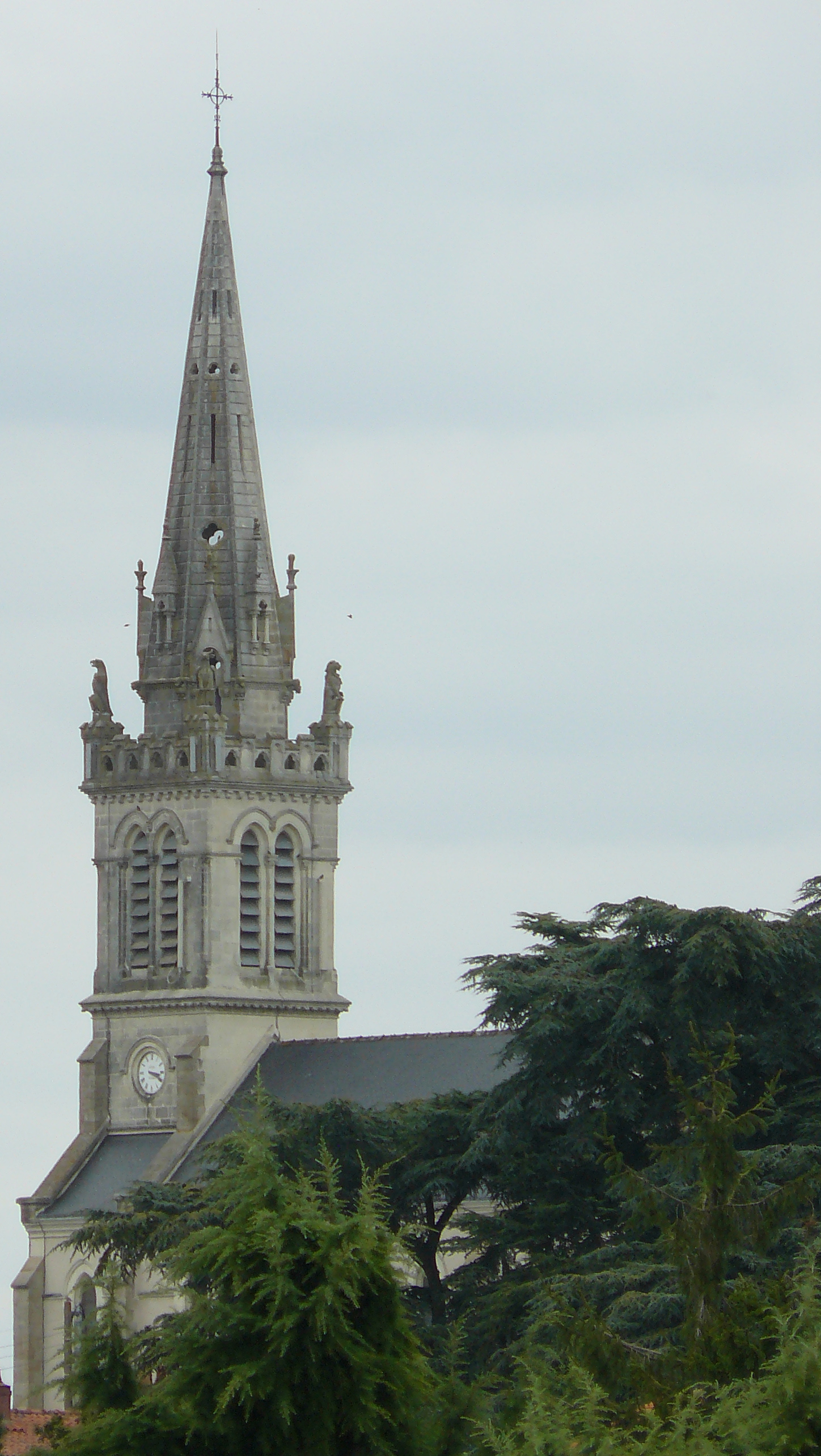

- Coat of arms
- Location of Gorges
- Location within France Location within Pays de la Loire
- Coordinates: 47°06′08″N 1°18′09″W
- Country: France
- Region: Pays de la Loire
- Department: Loire-Atlantique
- Arrondissement: Nantes
- Canton: Clisson
- Intercommunality: CA Clisson Sèvre et Maine Agglo

Government
  - Mayor (2020–2026): Didier Meyer
- Area^{1}: 15.77 km^{2} (6.09 sq mi)
- Highest elevation: 49 m (161 ft)
- Lowest elevation: 5 m (16 ft)
- Population (2023): 5,203
  - Density: 329.9/km^{2} (854.5/sq mi)
- Time zone: UTC+01:00 (CET)
  - Summer (DST): UTC+02:00 (CEST)
- INSEE/Postal code: 44064 /44190
- ^{1} French Land Register data, which excludes lakes, ponds, glaciers > 1 km^{2} (0.386 sq mi or 247 acres) and river estuaries.

Gorges (French pronunciation: [ɡɔʁʒ]; Gallo: Gorj, Breton: Gored) is a commune in the Loire-Atlantique department in western France.

== Population ==
Historical population

Year	Pop.	±% p.a.
1793	4,500	—
1821	825	−5.88%
1846	1,680	+2.89%
1872	1,735	+0.12%
1901	1,635	−0.20%
1926	1,594	−0.10%
1946	1,556	−0.12%
1962	1,563	+0.03%
1968	1,701	+1.42%

Year	Pop.	±% p.a.
1975	2,028	+2.54%
1982	2,379	+2.31%
1990	2,603	+1.13%
1999	2,649	+0.19%
2007	3,553	+3.74%
2012	4,404	+4.39%
2017	4,658	+1.13%
2023	5,203	+1.86%

Source: EHESS and INSEE (1968-2023)

== International relations ==
Gorges is twinned with Alatri in Italy.

== See also ==
- Communes of the Loire-Atlantique department
