= La Planche =

- Commune
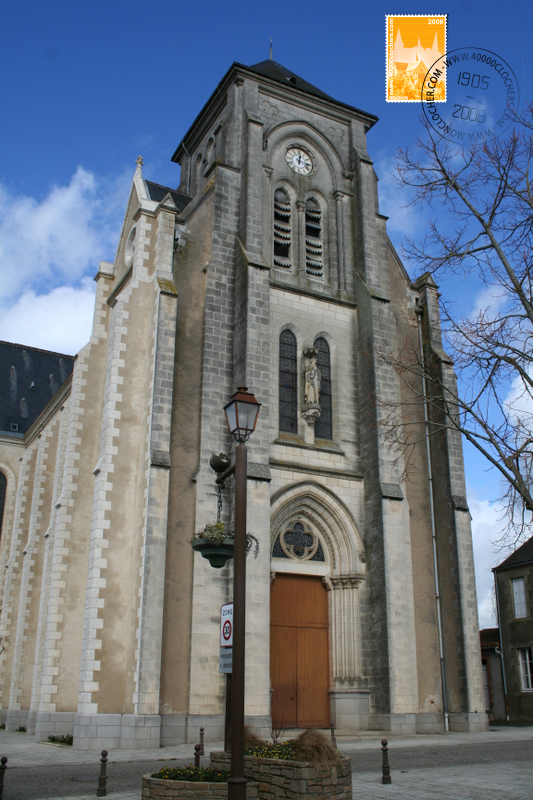

- Coat of arms
- Location of La Planche
- Location within France Location within Pays de la Loire
- Coordinates: 47°01′02″N 1°26′03″W
- Country: France
- Region: Pays de la Loire
- Department: Loire-Atlantique
- Arrondissement: Nantes
- Canton: Clisson
- Intercommunality: CA Clisson Sèvre et Maine Agglo

Government
  - Mayor (2020–2026): Séverine Joly-Piveteau
- Area^{1}: 24.42 km^{2} (9.43 sq mi)
- Highest elevation: 52 m (171 ft)
- Lowest elevation: 13 m (43 ft)
- Population (2023): 2,810
  - Density: 115/km^{2} (298/sq mi)
- Time zone: UTC+01:00 (CET)
  - Summer (DST): UTC+02:00 (CEST)
- INSEE/Postal code: 44127 /44140
- ^{1} French Land Register data, which excludes lakes, ponds, glaciers > 1 km^{2} (0.386 sq mi or 247 acres) and river estuaries.

La Planche (French pronunciation: [la plɑ̃ʃ]; Breton: Ar Plank) is a commune in the Loire-Atlantique department in the Pays de la Loire region in western France.

It is situated at 25 km (16 miles) south of Nantes. The 1973 Nantes mid-air collision took place above La Planche.

== Population ==
Historical population

| Year | Pop. | ±% p.a. |
|---|---|---|
| 1856 | 1,898 | — |
| 1872 | 1,817 | −0.27% |
| 1901 | 1,748 | −0.13% |
| 1926 | 1,430 | −0.80% |
| 1946 | 1,403 | −0.10% |
| 1962 | 1,513 | +0.47% |
| 1968 | 1,471 | −0.47% |
| 1975 | 1,532 | +0.58% |

| Year | Pop. | ±% p.a. |
|---|---|---|
| 1982 | 1,883 | +2.99% |
| 1990 | 2,052 | +1.08% |
| 1999 | 2,075 | +0.12% |
| 2007 | 2,297 | +1.28% |
| 2012 | 2,452 | +1.31% |
| 2017 | 2,640 | +1.49% |
| 2023 | 2,810 | +1.05% |

Source: EHESS and INSEE (1968-2023)

== Culture ==
In La Planche, the Musée de la chanson française has been established in 1992. The goal of the museum, to remember the artists that have established the heritage of the chanson.

== See also ==
- Communes of the Loire-Atlantique department
