= Petite Maine =

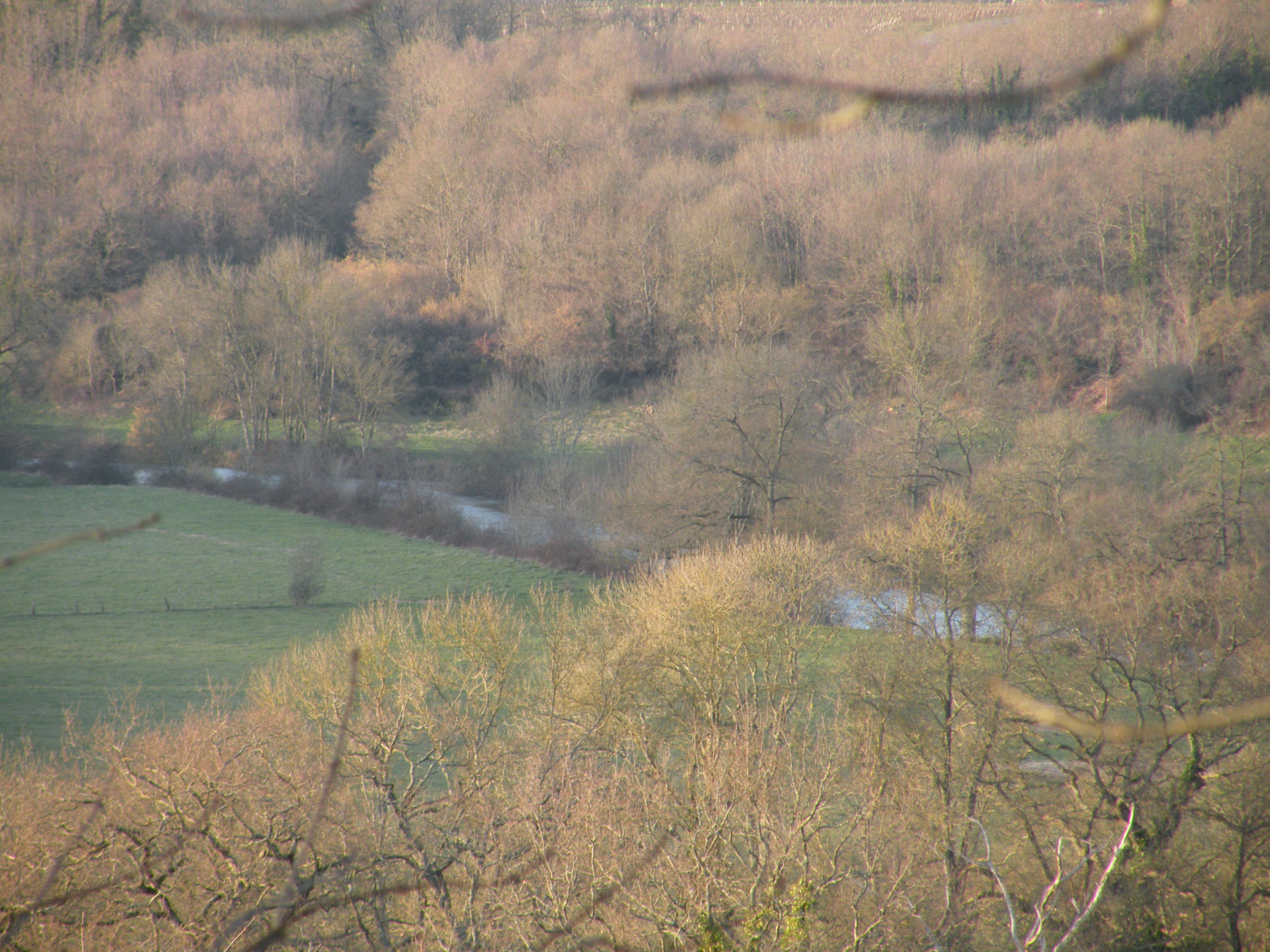

Location
- Country: France

Physical characteristics
- Mouth
  - location: Sèvre Nantaise near Vertou
  - coordinates: 47.1524°N 1.4449°W
- Length: 68.4 km (42.5 mi)
- Basin size: 679 km^{2} (262 sq mi)

Basin features
- Progression: Sèvre Nantaise→ Loire→ Atlantic Ocean

The Petite Maine (French pronunciation: [pətit mɛn]; also: Maine) is a river in western France. It is a 68.4 km (42.5 mi) long left tributary of the Sèvre Nantaise near Vertou. Its basin area is 679 km^{2} (262 sq mi). The lowermost 6 km up to Château-Thébaud is navigable.
