= Remouillé =

- Commune
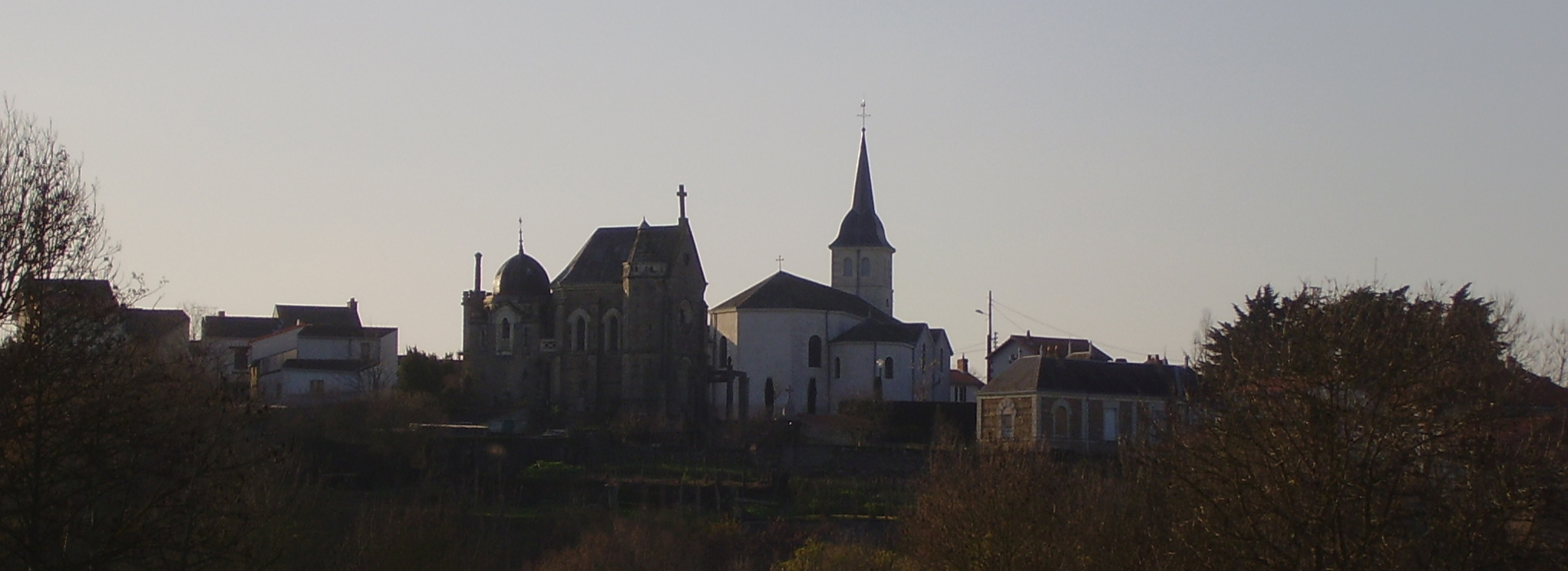

- Coat of arms
- Location of Remouillé
- Location within France Location within Pays de la Loire
- Coordinates: 47°03′23″N 1°22′33″W
- Country: France
- Region: Pays de la Loire
- Department: Loire-Atlantique
- Arrondissement: Nantes
- Canton: Clisson
- Intercommunality: CA Clisson Sèvre et Maine Agglo

Government
  - Mayor (2020–2026): Jérôme Letourneau
- Area^{1}: 21.38 km^{2} (8.25 sq mi)
- Elevation: 38 m (125 ft)
- Highest elevation: 61 m (200 ft)
- Lowest elevation: 17 m (56 ft)
- Population (2023): 1,932
  - Density: 90.36/km^{2} (234.0/sq mi)
- Time zone: UTC+01:00 (CET)
  - Summer (DST): UTC+02:00 (CEST)
- INSEE/Postal code: 44142 /44140
- Dialling codes: 02
- ^{1} French Land Register data, which excludes lakes, ponds, glaciers > 1 km^{2} (0.386 sq mi or 247 acres) and river estuaries.

Remouillé (French pronunciation: [ʁəmuje]; Breton: Ruvelieg) is a commune in the Loire-Atlantique department in western France.

Its name comes from the Poitevin language "remoulyum" which means wet.

== History ==
The village was partly burned during the War in the Vendée in 1794.

== Population ==
Historical population
Year	Pop.	±% p.a.
1968	854	—
1975	939	+1.36%
1982	1,136	+2.76%
1990	1,231	+1.01%
1999	1,443	+1.78%
2007	1,627	+1.51%
2012	1,740	+1.35%
2017	1,903	+1.81%
2023	1,932	+0.25%
Source: INSEE

== See also ==
- Communes of the Loire-Atlantique department
