= Vieillevigne, Loire-Atlantique =

Vieillevigne Henwinieg (Breton)
- Commune
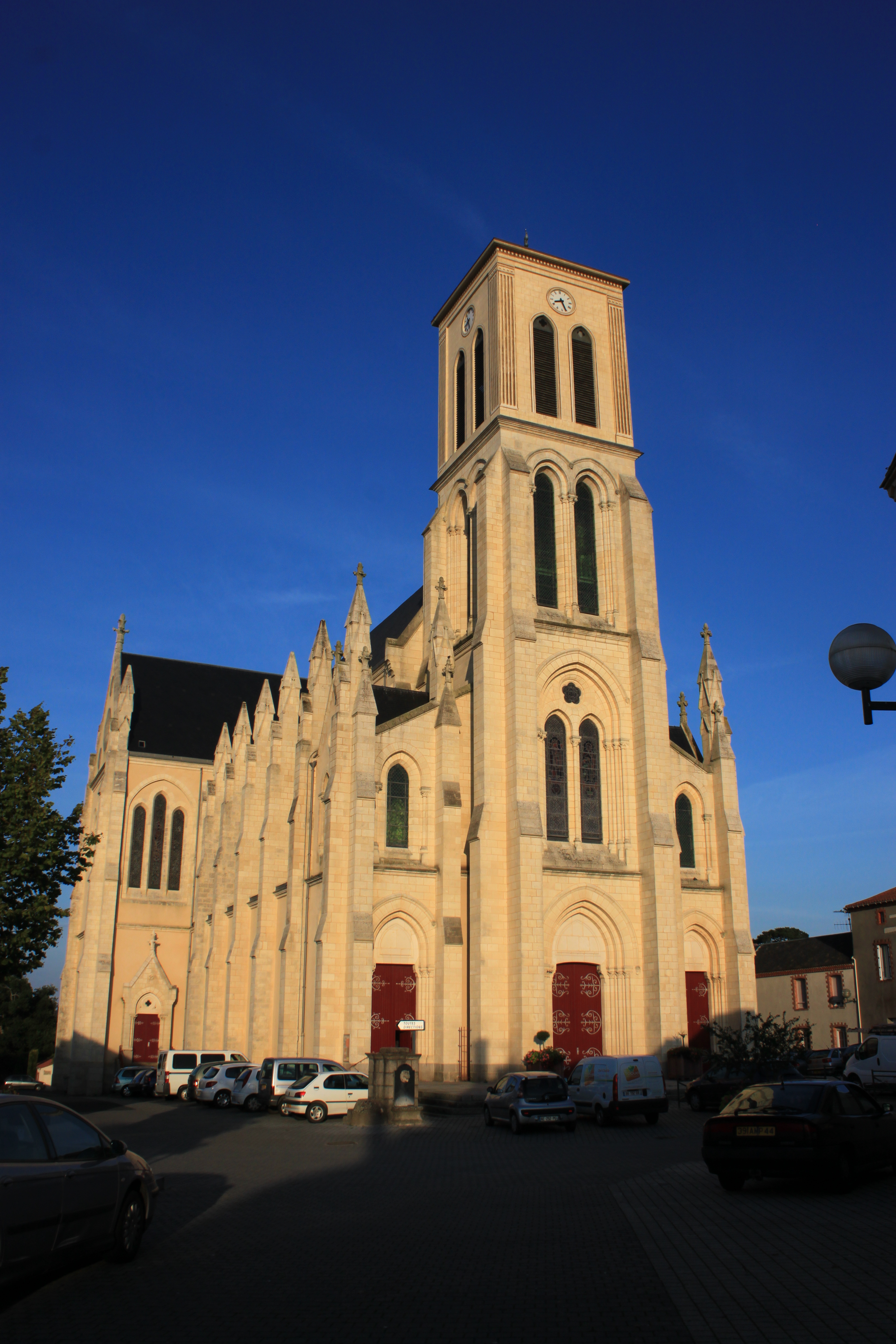
- The church of Our Lady, in Vieillevigne

- Coat of arms
- Location of Vieillevigne
- Location within France Location within Pays de la Loire
- Coordinates: 46°58′20″N 1°25′56″W
- Country: France
- Region: Pays de la Loire
- Department: Loire-Atlantique
- Arrondissement: Nantes
- Canton: Clisson
- Intercommunality: CA Clisson Sèvre et Maine Agglo

Government
  - Mayor (2020–2026): Nelly Sorin
- Area^{1}: 51.76 km^{2} (19.98 sq mi)
- Highest elevation: 66 m (217 ft)
- Lowest elevation: 21 m (69 ft)
- Population (2023): 4,150
  - Density: 80.2/km^{2} (208/sq mi)
- Demonym(s): Vieillevignois, Vieillevignoises
- Time zone: UTC+01:00 (CET)
  - Summer (DST): UTC+02:00 (CEST)
- INSEE/Postal code: 44216 /44116
- Website: www.vieillevigne44.com
- ^{1} French Land Register data, which excludes lakes, ponds, glaciers > 1 km^{2} (0.386 sq mi or 247 acres) and river estuaries.

Vieillevigne (French pronunciation: [vjɛjviɲ]; Breton: Henwinieg) is a commune in the Loire-Atlantique department in western France.

== Population ==
Historical population
Year	Pop.	±% p.a.
1968	2,892	—
1975	2,793	−0.50%
1982	2,948	+0.77%
1990	3,127	+0.74%
1999	3,263	+0.47%
2007	3,794	+1.90%
2012	3,929	+0.70%
2017	3,959	+0.15%
2023	4,150	+0.79%
Source: INSEE

== See also ==
- Communes of the Loire-Atlantique department
