= Haute-Goulaine =

Haute-Goulaine Hautt-Góleinn (Gallo) Gorre-Goulen (Breton)
- Commune
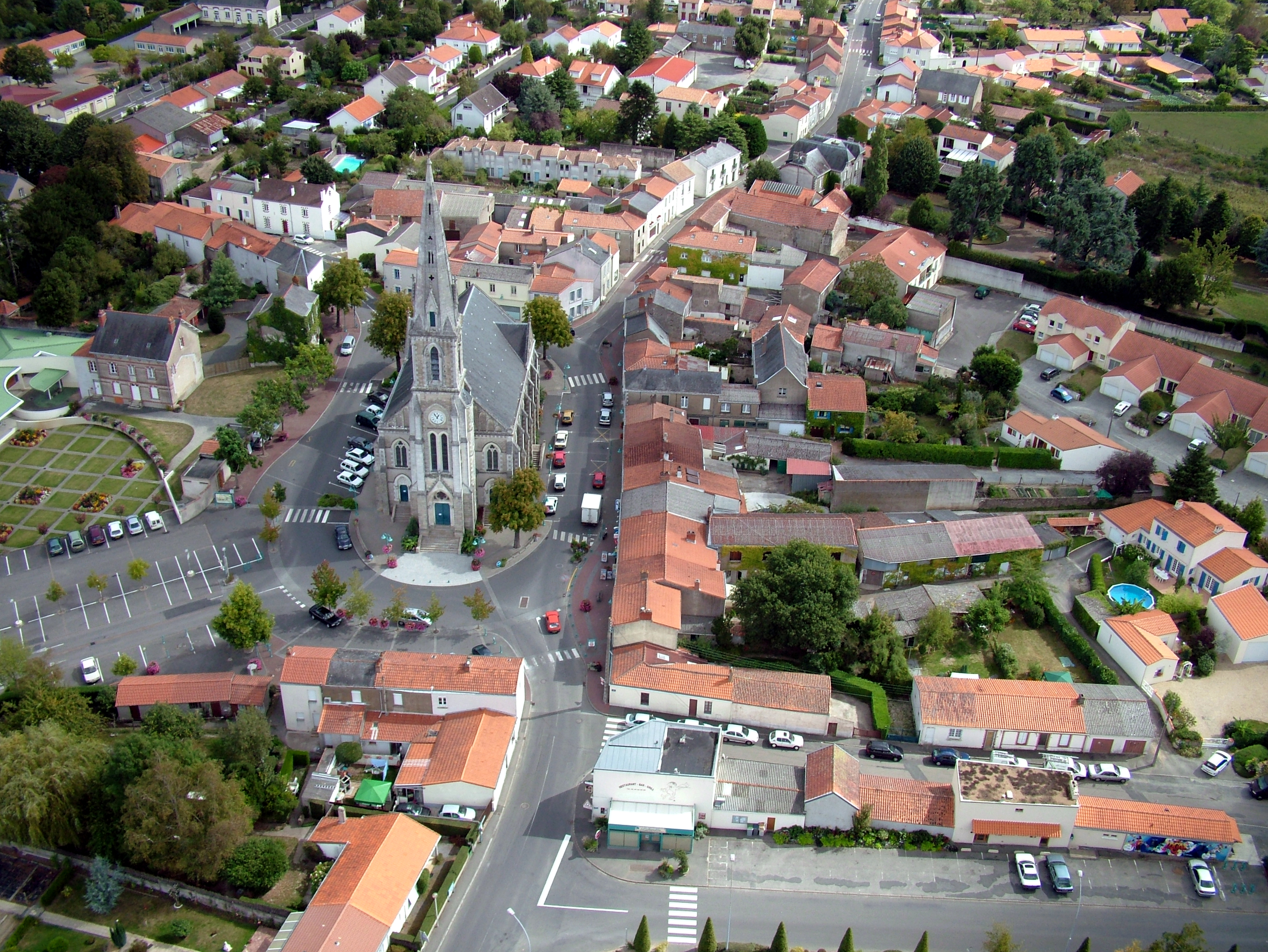

- Coat of arms
- Location of Haute-Goulaine
- Location within France Location within Pays de la Loire
- Coordinates: 47°11′59″N 1°25′39″W
- Country: France
- Region: Pays de la Loire
- Department: Loire-Atlantique
- Arrondissement: Nantes
- Canton: Saint-Sébastien-sur-Loire
- Intercommunality: CA Clisson Sèvre et Maine Agglo

Government
  - Mayor (2020–2026): Fabrice Cuchot
- Area^{1}: 20.59 km^{2} (7.95 sq mi)
- Highest elevation: 56 m (184 ft)
- Lowest elevation: 0 m (0 ft)
- Population (2023): 6,095
  - Density: 296.0/km^{2} (766.7/sq mi)
- Time zone: UTC+01:00 (CET)
  - Summer (DST): UTC+02:00 (CEST)
- INSEE/Postal code: 44071 /44115
- ^{1} French Land Register data, which excludes lakes, ponds, glaciers > 1 km^{2} (0.386 sq mi or 247 acres) and river estuaries.

Haute-Goulaine (French pronunciation: [ot ɡulɛn]; Gallo: Hautt-Góleinn, Breton: Gorre-Goulen) is a commune in the Loire-Atlantique department in western France. The commune is located near Nantes. Historically, the commune was part of Brittany.

The chateau de Goulaine is one of the tourist sites that can be visited in the commune. Henri IV of France (king from 1589 to 1610) made the seigneury of Goulaine a marquisate in favour of Gabriel de Goulaine, husband of Marguerite de Bretagne.

On 22 October 1941, six of the 16 hostages shot in Nantes following the attack on Karl Hotz were buried in the Haute-Goulaine cemetery.

== Population ==
Historical population

| Year | Pop. | ±% p.a. |
|---|---|---|
| 1793 | 1,470 | — |
| 1800 | 855 | −7.45% |
| 1806 | 1,481 | +9.59% |
| 1821 | 1,548 | +0.30% |
| 1831 | 1,489 | −0.39% |
| 1841 | 1,614 | +0.81% |
| 1846 | 1,624 | +0.12% |
| 1851 | 1,676 | +0.63% |
| 1856 | 1,666 | −0.12% |
| 1861 | 1,753 | +1.02% |
| 1866 | 1,801 | +0.54% |
| 1872 | 1,762 | −0.36% |
| 1876 | 1,841 | +1.10% |
| 1881 | 1,831 | −0.11% |
| 1886 | 1,807 | −0.26% |
| 1891 | 1,656 | −1.73% |
| 1896 | 1,603 | −0.65% |
| 1901 | 1,561 | −0.53% |

| Year | Pop. | ±% p.a. |
|---|---|---|
| 1906 | 1,616 | +0.69% |
| 1911 | 1,579 | −0.46% |
| 1921 | 1,341 | −1.62% |
| 1926 | 1,296 | −0.68% |
| 1931 | 1,281 | −0.23% |
| 1936 | 1,301 | +0.31% |
| 1946 | 1,354 | +0.40% |
| 1954 | 1,607 | +2.16% |
| 1962 | 1,815 | +1.53% |
| 1968 | 1,981 | +1.47% |
| 1975 | 2,582 | +3.86% |
| 1982 | 3,225 | +3.23% |
| 1990 | 3,823 | +2.15% |
| 1999 | 4,925 | +2.85% |
| 2007 | 5,470 | +1.32% |
| 2012 | 5,539 | +0.25% |
| 2017 | 5,764 | +0.80% |
| 2023 | 6,095 | +0.93% |

Source: EHESS and INSEE (1968-2023)

== See also ==
- Communes of the Loire-Atlantique department
