= Maisdon-sur-Sèvre =

Maisdon-sur-Sèvre Maédon (Gallo) Maezon-ar-Gwini (Breton)
- Commune
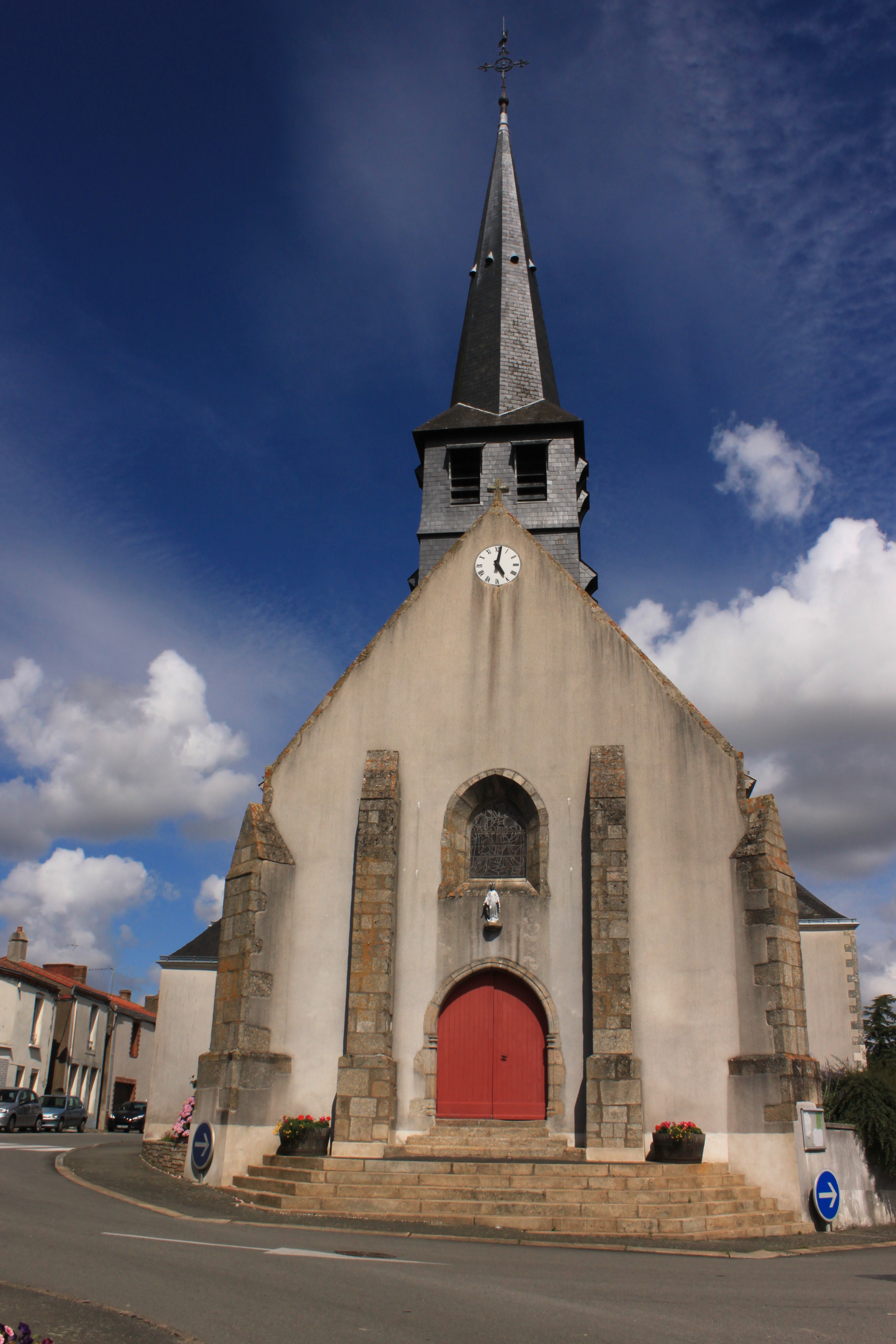

- Coat of arms
- Location of Maisdon-sur-Sèvre
- Location within France Location within Pays de la Loire
- Coordinates: 47°05′53″N 1°23′02″W
- Country: France
- Region: Pays de la Loire
- Department: Loire-Atlantique
- Arrondissement: Nantes
- Canton: Clisson
- Intercommunality: CA Clisson Sèvre et Maine Agglo

Government
  - Mayor (2020–2026): Aymar Rivallin
- Area^{1}: 17.45 km^{2} (6.74 sq mi)
- Highest elevation: 63 m (207 ft)
- Lowest elevation: 3 m (9.8 ft)
- Population (2023): 3,095
  - Density: 177.4/km^{2} (459.4/sq mi)
- Time zone: UTC+01:00 (CET)
  - Summer (DST): UTC+02:00 (CEST)
- INSEE/Postal code: 44088 /44690
- ^{1} French Land Register data, which excludes lakes, ponds, glaciers > 1 km^{2} (0.386 sq mi or 247 acres) and river estuaries.

Maisdon-sur-Sèvre (French pronunciation: [mɛdɔ̃ syʁ sɛvʁ], literally Maisdon on Sèvre; Gallo: Maédon, Breton: Maezon-ar-Gwini) is a commune in the Loire-Atlantique department in western France.

== Population ==
Historical population

Year	Pop.	±% p.a.
1793	2,200	—
1821	2,275	+0.12%
1846	2,139	−0.25%
1872	2,059	−0.15%
1901	1,884	−0.31%
1926	1,458	−1.02%
1946	1,243	−0.79%
1962	1,296	+0.26%
1968	1,284	−0.15%

Year	Pop.	±% p.a.
1975	1,331	+0.51%
1982	1,637	+3.00%
1990	1,985	+2.44%
1999	2,050	+0.36%
2007	2,479	+2.40%
2012	2,809	+2.53%
2017	2,942	+0.93%
2023	3,095	+0.85%

Source: EHESS and INSEE (1968-2023)

== Twinning ==
Maisdon-sur-Sèvre has been twinned with Keelby, a village in Lincolnshire since 1990. There is a street in Maisdon-sur-Sèvre named after the English village, Allée de Keelby.

== See also ==
- Communes of the Loire-Atlantique department
