= Olivier de Clisson (disambiguation) =

Olivier de Clisson most often refers to Olivier V de Clisson (1336–1407), a Breton soldier during the Hundred Years' War.

It may also refer to other members of the same family:

- Olivier I de Clisson (d. 1262)
- Olivier II de Clisson (d. 1307)
- Olivier III de Clisson (d. 1320)
- Olivier IV de Clisson (d. 1343)
