= Saint-Lumine-de-Clisson =

- Commune
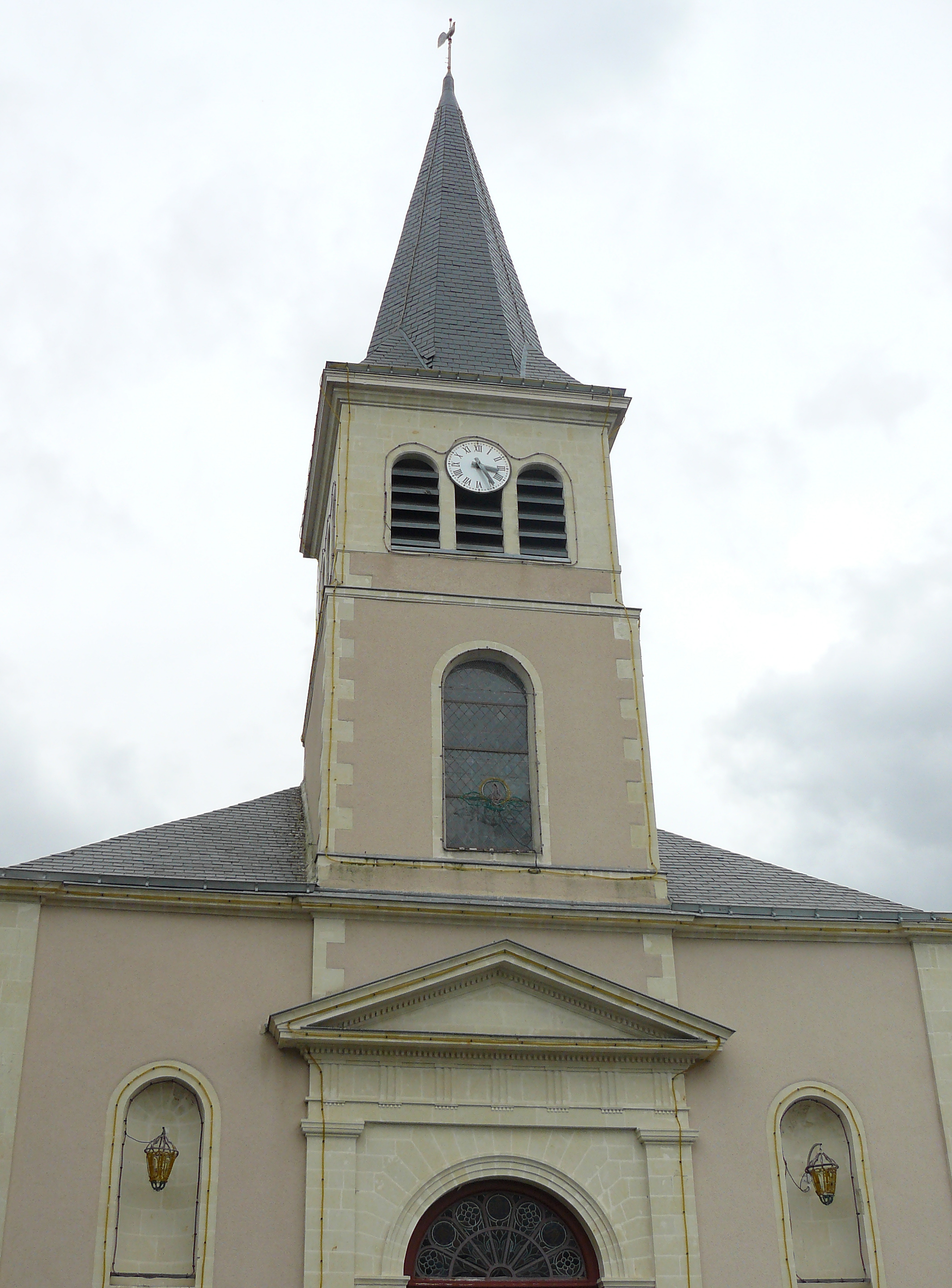
- The church in Saint-Lumine-de-Clisson

- Coat of arms
- Location of Saint-Lumine-de-Clisson
- Location within France Location within Pays de la Loire
- Coordinates: 47°05′03″N 1°20′09″W
- Country: France
- Region: Pays de la Loire
- Department: Loire-Atlantique
- Arrondissement: Nantes
- Canton: Clisson
- Intercommunality: CA Clisson Sèvre et Maine Agglo

Government
  - Mayor (2020–2026): Janik Riviere
- Area^{1}: 18.26 km^{2} (7.05 sq mi)
- Elevation: 30 m (98 ft)
- Highest elevation: 61 m (200 ft)
- Lowest elevation: 2 m (6.6 ft)
- Population (2023): 2,100
  - Density: 120/km^{2} (300/sq mi)
- Time zone: UTC+01:00 (CET)
  - Summer (DST): UTC+02:00 (CEST)
- INSEE/Postal code: 44173 /44190
- ^{1} French Land Register data, which excludes lakes, ponds, glaciers > 1 km^{2} (0.386 sq mi or 247 acres) and river estuaries.

Saint-Lumine-de-Clisson (French pronunciation: [sɛ̃ lymin də klisɔ̃], literally Saint-Lumine of Clisson; Breton: Sant-Leven-Klison) is a commune in the Loire-Atlantique department in western France.

== Population ==
Historical population
| Year | Pop. | ±% p.a. |
|---|---|---|
| 1968 | 1,013 | — |
| 1975 | 997 | −0.23% |
| 1982 | 1,189 | +2.55% |
| 1990 | 1,255 | +0.68% |
| 1999 | 1,348 | +0.80% |
| 2007 | 1,778 | +3.52% |
| 2012 | 2,033 | +2.72% |
| 2017 | 2,103 | +0.68% |
| 2023 | 2,100 | −0.02% |
Source: INSEE

== International relations ==
Saint-Lumine-de-Clisson is twinned with:

- Alatri in Italy

== See also ==
- Communes of the Loire-Atlantique department
