= Monnières, Loire-Atlantique =

Monnières Monierr (Gallo) Meliner (Breton)
- Commune
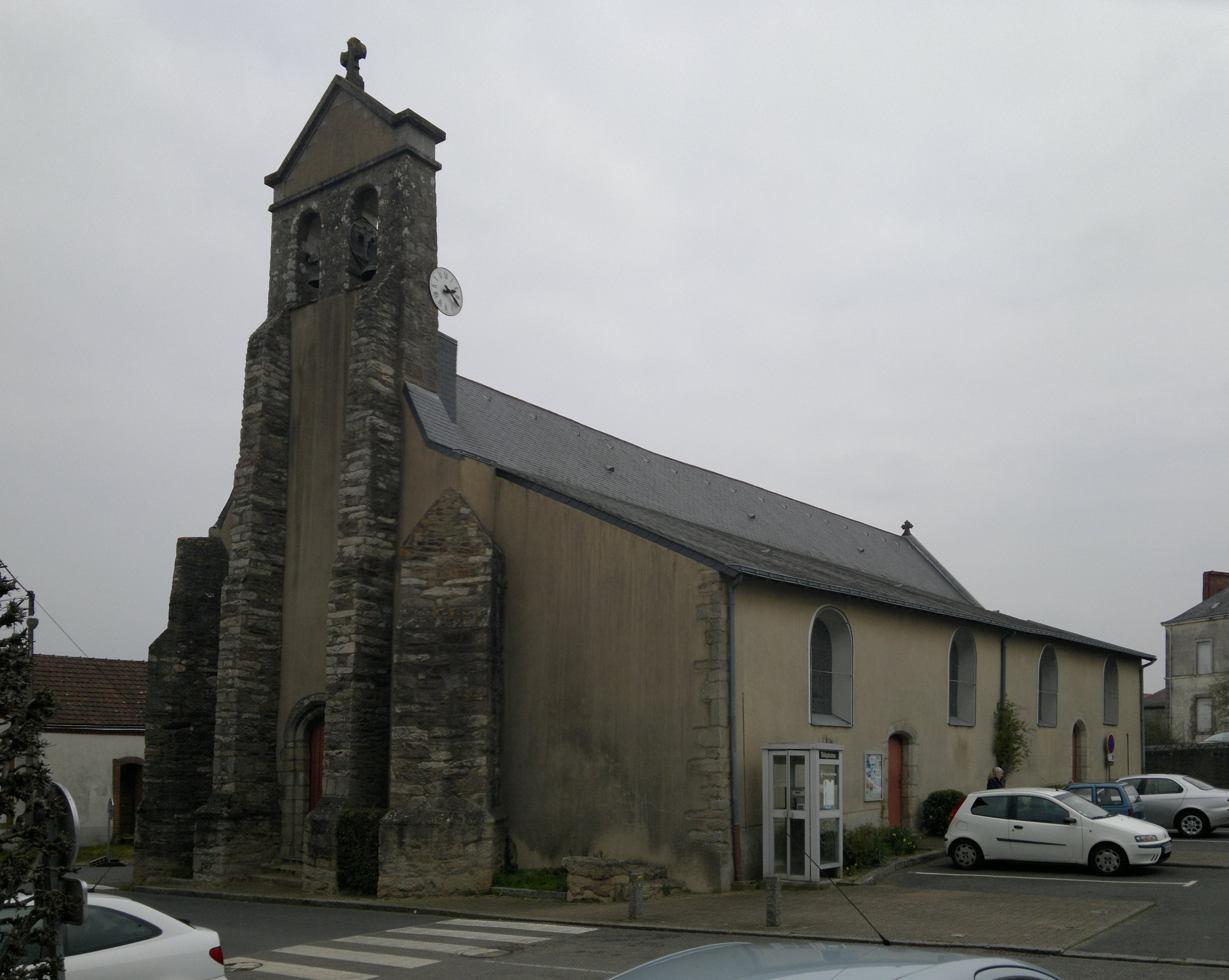

- Coat of arms
- Location of Monnières
- Location within France Location within Pays de la Loire
- Coordinates: 47°07′57″N 1°21′17″W
- Country: France
- Region: Pays de la Loire
- Department: Loire-Atlantique
- Arrondissement: Nantes
- Canton: Clisson
- Intercommunality: CA Clisson Sèvre et Maine Agglo

Government
  - Mayor (2020–2026): Benoît Couteau
- Area^{1}: 9.78 km^{2} (3.78 sq mi)
- Highest elevation: 61 m (200 ft)
- Lowest elevation: 2 m (6.6 ft)
- Population (2023): 2,388
  - Density: 244/km^{2} (632/sq mi)
- Time zone: UTC+01:00 (CET)
  - Summer (DST): UTC+02:00 (CEST)
- INSEE/Postal code: 44100 /44690
- ^{1} French Land Register data, which excludes lakes, ponds, glaciers > 1 km^{2} (0.386 sq mi or 247 acres) and river estuaries.

Monnières (French pronunciation: [mɔnjɛʁ]; Gallo: Monierr, Breton: Meliner) is a commune in the Loire-Atlantique department in western France.

== Population ==
Historical population

Year	Pop.	±% p.a.
1793	1,100	—
1821	978	−0.42%
1846	1,024	+0.18%
1872	1,042	+0.07%
1901	901	−0.50%
1926	988	+0.37%
1946	893	−0.50%
1962	953	+0.41%
1968	941	−0.21%

Year	Pop.	±% p.a.
1975	1,019	+1.14%
1982	1,235	+2.78%
1990	1,379	+1.39%
1999	1,541	+1.24%
2007	1,757	+1.65%
2012	1,933	+1.93%
2017	2,239	+2.98%
2023	2,388	+1.08%

Source: EHESS and INSEE (1968-2023)

== See also ==
- Communes of the Loire-Atlantique department
