= Les Sorinières =

Les Sorinières Kersoren (Breton)
- Commune
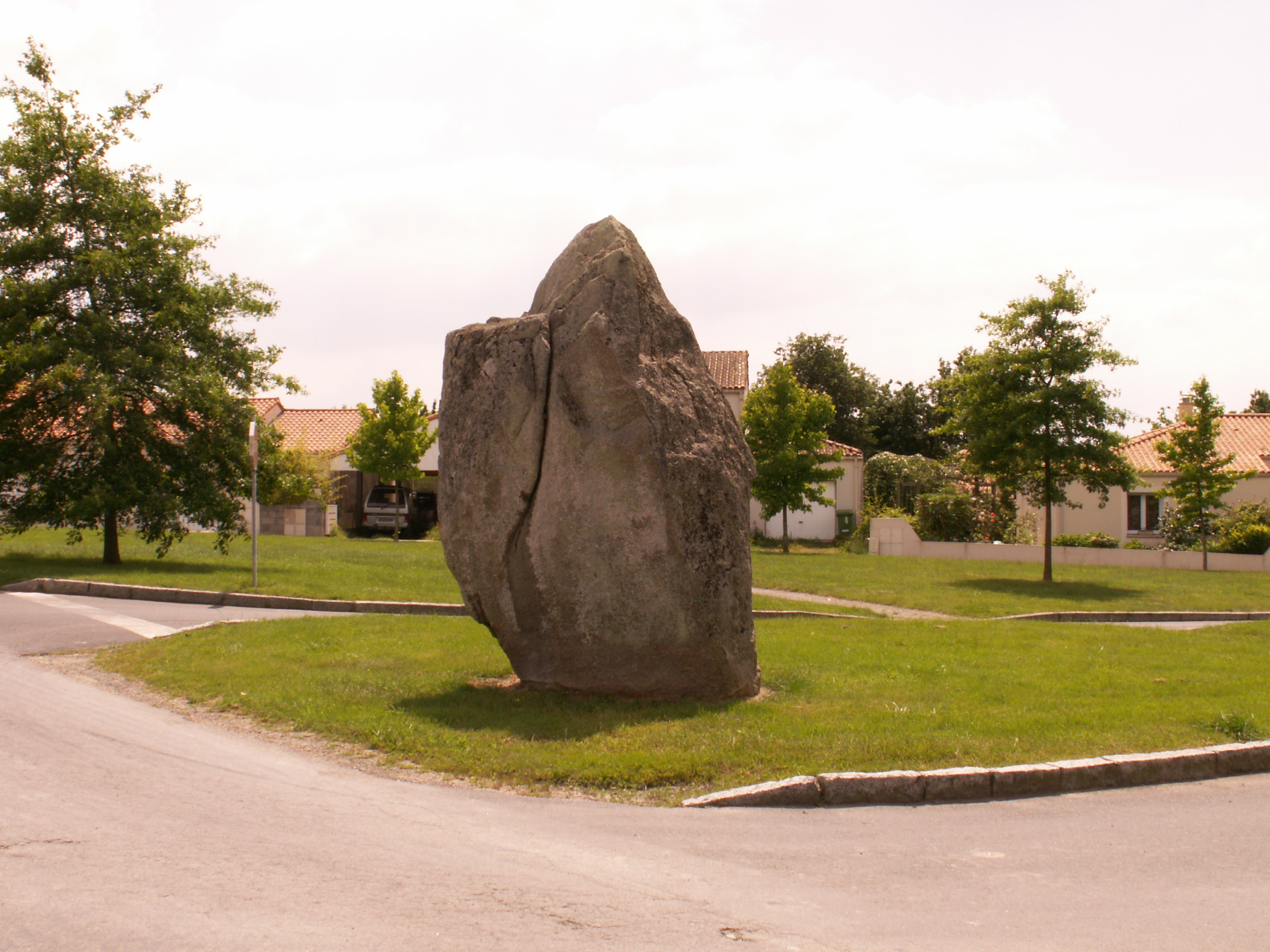
- The menhir of Haute-Lande

- Coat of arms
- Location of Les Sorinières
- Location within France Location within Pays de la Loire
- Coordinates: 47°08′50″N 1°31′43″W
- Country: France
- Region: Pays de la Loire
- Department: Loire-Atlantique
- Arrondissement: Nantes
- Canton: Vertou
- Intercommunality: Nantes Métropole

Government
  - Mayor (2020–2026): Christelle Scuotto
- Area^{1}: 13.02 km^{2} (5.03 sq mi)
- Highest elevation: 44 m (144 ft)
- Lowest elevation: 3 m (9.8 ft)
- Population (2023): 9,275
  - Density: 712.4/km^{2} (1,845/sq mi)
- Demonym(s): Sorinièroise, Sorinièrois
- Time zone: UTC+01:00 (CET)
  - Summer (DST): UTC+02:00 (CEST)
- INSEE/Postal code: 44198 /44840
- Website: www.ville-sorinieres.fr
- ^{1} French Land Register data, which excludes lakes, ponds, glaciers > 1 km^{2} (0.386 sq mi or 247 acres) and river estuaries.

Les Sorinières (French pronunciation: [le sɔʁinjɛʁ]; Breton: Kersoren) is a commune in the Loire-Atlantique department in western France.

It is the location of Villeneuve Abbey, where the tomb of Constance, Duchess of Brittany, her husband Guy of Thouars, and others can be found.

== Population ==
Historical population
Year	Pop.	±% p.a.
1968	2,194	—
1975	3,149	+5.30%
1982	4,299	+4.55%
1990	5,174	+2.34%
1999	6,239	+2.10%
2007	7,259	+1.91%
2012	7,648	+1.05%
2017	8,541	+2.23%
2023	9,275	+1.38%
Source: INSEE

== See also ==
- Communes of the Loire-Atlantique department
