= Basse-Goulaine =

Basse-Goulaine Bass-Góleinn (Gallo) Goueled-Goulen (Breton)
- Commune
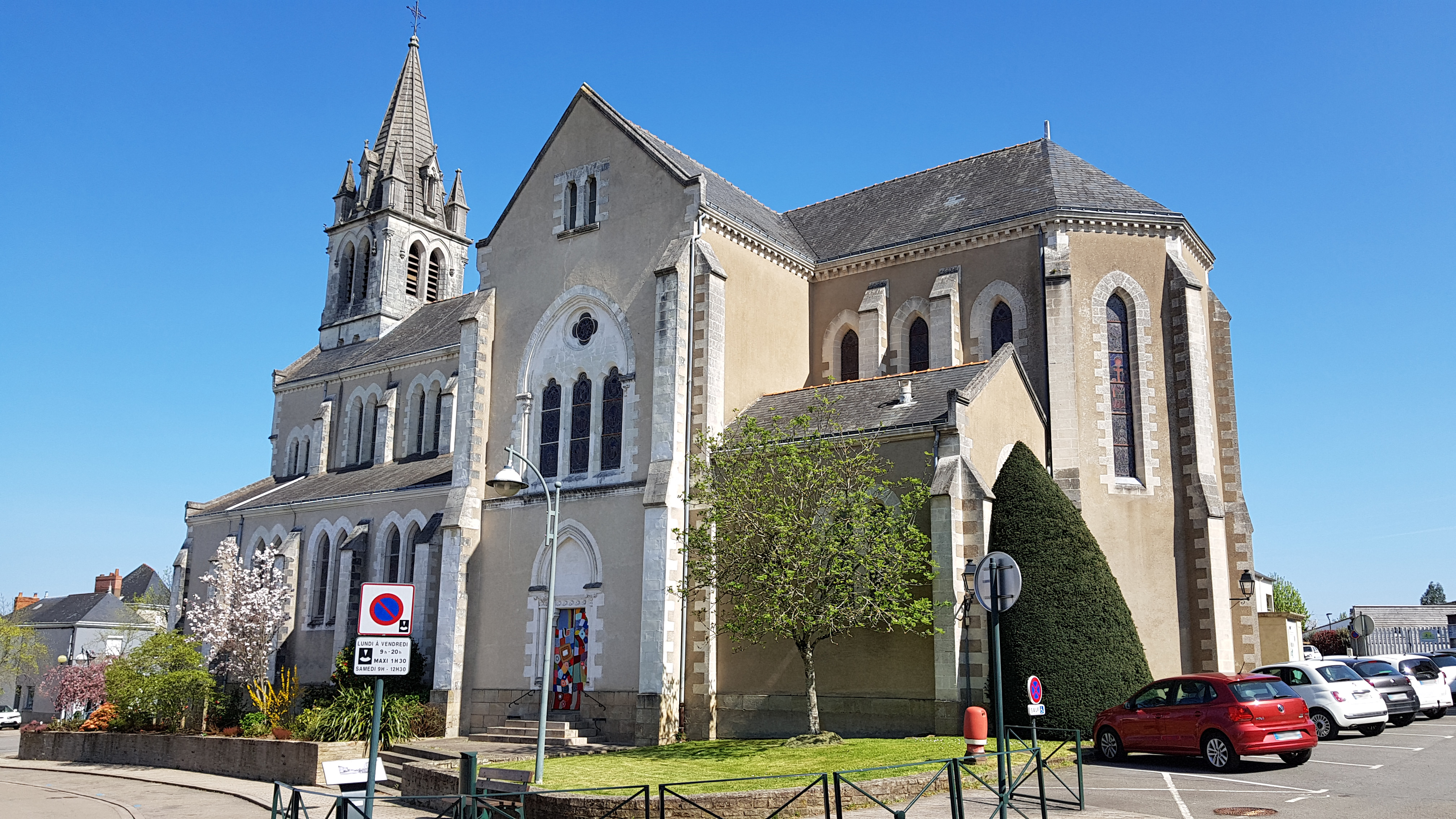

- Coat of arms
- Location of Basse-Goulaine
- Location within France Location within Pays de la Loire
- Coordinates: 47°12′58″N 1°27′51″W
- Country: France
- Region: Pays de la Loire
- Department: Loire-Atlantique
- Arrondissement: Nantes
- Canton: Saint-Sébastien-sur-Loire
- Intercommunality: Nantes Métropole

Government
  - Mayor (2020–2026): Alain Vey
- Area^{1}: 13.74 km^{2} (5.31 sq mi)
- Highest elevation: 44 m (144 ft)
- Lowest elevation: 1 m (3.3 ft)
- Population (2023): 9,679
  - Density: 704.4/km^{2} (1,824/sq mi)
- Time zone: UTC+01:00 (CET)
  - Summer (DST): UTC+02:00 (CEST)
- INSEE/Postal code: 44009 /44115
- ^{1} French Land Register data, which excludes lakes, ponds, glaciers > 1 km^{2} (0.386 sq mi or 247 acres) and river estuaries.

Basse-Goulaine (French pronunciation: [bas ɡulɛn]; Gallo: Bass-Góleinn, Breton: Goueled-Goulen) is a commune in the Loire-Atlantique department in western France.

The commune is part of historical Brittany located in the Pays nantais (historical country) and in the Vignoble nantais (traditional country).

== Population ==
Historical population

Year	Pop.	±% p.a.
1793	1,153	—
1800	776	−5.50%
1806	1,006	+4.42%
1821	1,180	+1.07%
1831	1,218	+0.32%
1841	1,168	−0.42%
1846	1,220	+0.87%
1851	1,227	+0.11%
1856	1,294	+1.07%
1861	1,287	−0.11%
1866	1,255	−0.50%
1872	1,187	−0.92%
1876	1,226	+0.81%
1881	1,182	−0.73%
1886	1,189	+0.12%
1891	1,234	+0.75%
1896	1,259	+0.40%
1901	1,250	−0.14%

Year	Pop.	±% p.a.
1906	1,264	+0.22%
1911	1,170	−1.53%
1921	1,105	−0.57%
1926	1,176	+1.25%
1931	1,103	−1.27%
1936	1,185	+1.44%
1946	1,333	+1.18%
1954	1,539	+1.81%
1962	1,853	+2.35%
1968	2,160	+2.59%
1975	3,036	+4.98%
1982	4,099	+4.38%
1990	5,910	+4.68%
1999	7,499	+2.68%
2007	7,927	+0.70%
2012	8,244	+0.79%
2017	9,036	+1.85%
2023	9,679	+1.15%

Source: EHESS and INSEE (1968-2023)

== See also ==
- Communes of the Loire-Atlantique department
