= Clisson Sèvre et Maine Agglo =

- Communauté d'agglomération
- Interactive map of Clisson Sèvre et Maine Agglo
- Coordinates: 47°05′N 01°20′W
- Country: France
- Region: Pays de la Loire
- Department: Loire-Atlantique
- No. of communes: {{{nbcomm}}}
- Established: 2017
- Area: 309.6 km^{2} (119.5 sq mi)
- Population (2019): 56,135
  - Density: 181.3/km^{2} (469.6/sq mi)
- Website: www.clissonsevremaine.fr

Clisson Sèvre et Maine Agglo is the communauté d'agglomération, an intercommunal structure, centred on the town of Clisson. It is located in the Loire-Atlantique department, in the Pays de la Loire region, western France. Created in 2017, its seat is in Clisson. Its area is 309.6 km^{2}. Its population was 56,135 in 2019, of which 7,435 in Clisson proper.

== Composition ==
The communauté d'agglomération consists of the following 16 communes:

1. Aigrefeuille-sur-Maine
2. Boussay
3. Château-Thébaud
4. Clisson
5. Gétigné
6. Gorges
7. La Haie-Fouassière
8. Haute-Goulaine
9. Maisdon-sur-Sèvre
10. Monnières
11. La Planche
12. Remouillé
13. Saint-Fiacre-sur-Maine
14. Saint-Hilaire-de-Clisson
15. Saint-Lumine-de-Clisson
16. Vieillevigne
