= Canton of Clisson =

Coordinates: 47.09°N 1.29°W

The canton of Clisson is an administrative division of the Loire-Atlantique department, western France. Its borders were modified at the French canton reorganisation which came into effect in March 2015. Its seat is in Clisson.

It consists of the following communes:

1. Aigrefeuille-sur-Maine
2. Boussay
3. Clisson
4. Gétigné
5. Gorges
6. Maisdon-sur-Sèvre
7. Monnières
8. La Planche
9. Remouillé
10. Saint-Hilaire-de-Clisson
11. Saint-Lumine-de-Clisson
12. Vieillevigne
