= Sèvre Nantaise =

River in France

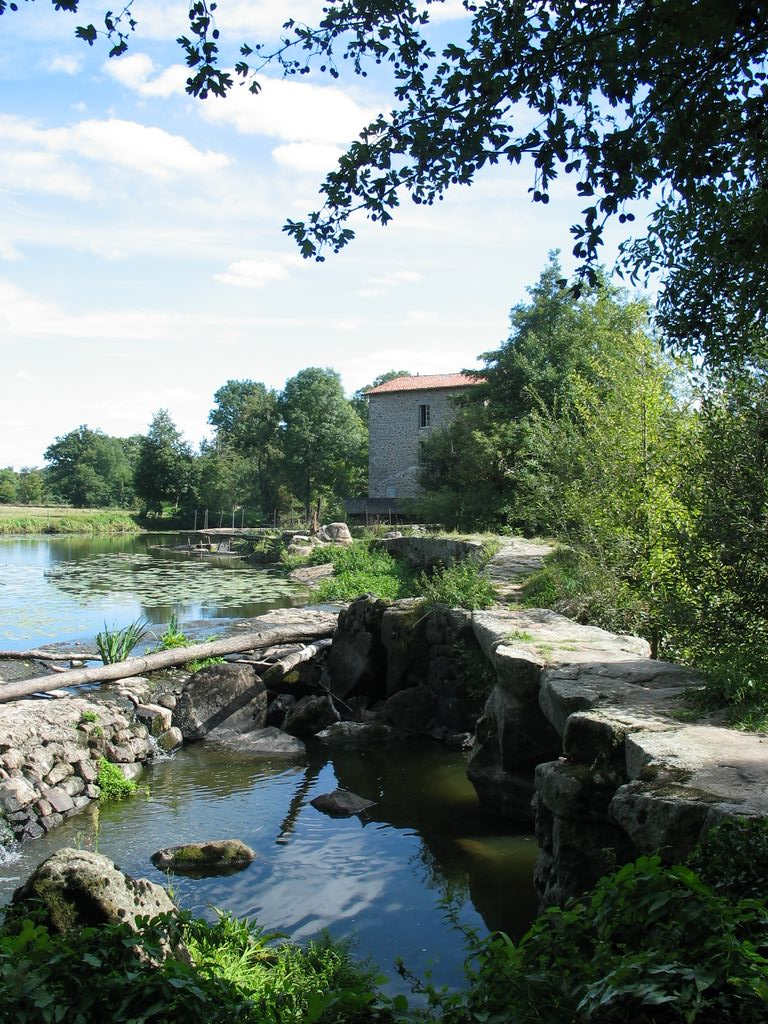
- The Sèvre Nantaise, near Tiffauges

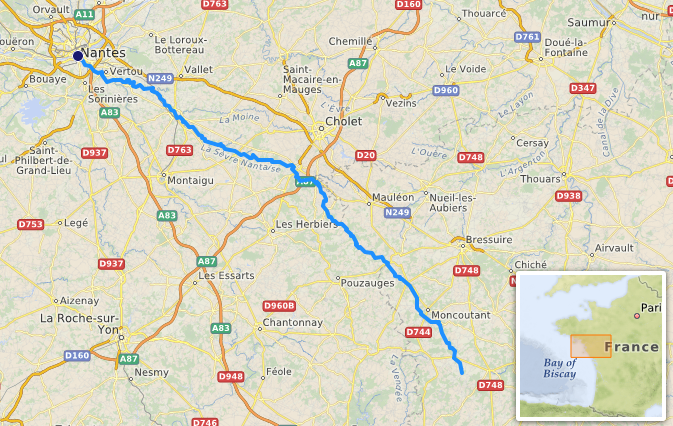
- Native name: La Sèvre nantaise (French)

Location
- Country: France

Physical characteristics
- Source
  - location: Deux-Sèvres
  - elevation: 215 m (705 ft)
- Mouth
  - location: Loire
  - coordinates: 47°11′46″N 1°32′49″W
- Length: 141.8 km (88.1 mi)
- Basin size: 2,356 km^{2} (910 sq mi)
- Discharge
  - average: 9.5 m^{3}/s (340 cu ft/s)

Basin features
- Progression: Loire→ Atlantic Ocean

The Sèvre Nantaise (French pronunciation: [sɛvʁ nɑ̃tɛz]) is a river in the Pays de la Loire regions in western France. It is a left-bank tributary of the Loire. Its total length is 141.8 km (88.1 mi). Its source is in the Deux-Sèvres department, near Secondigny. It flows from south to north through the departments and towns listed here, reaching the river Loire in the city of Nantes. That city gives it the name Sèvre Nantaise, distinguishing it from the Sèvre Niortaise further south. Its longest tributaries are the Moine and the Petite Maine.

== Departments and communes along its course ==
This list is ordered from source to mouth:

- Deux-Sèvres: Moncoutant, La Forêt-sur-Sèvre
- Vendée: Saint-Laurent-sur-Sèvre, Mortagne-sur-Sèvre, Tiffauges
- Maine-et-Loire: Sèvremoine
- Loire-Atlantique: Clisson, Le Pallet, Vertou, Rezé, Nantes

The complete list is on the French page for this river.

== Navigation ==
The river is navigable over a length of 21.5 km (13.4 mi) from the village of Monnières to the confluence. It has a horseshoe weir (Chaussée Des Moines) and lock at Vertou, and a tidal sluice open to boats an hour before and after high tide at Pont-Rousseau, in the suburbs of Nantes. The river is an important resource for tourism in the region. Beyond the navigable section, the river is a popular destination for canoeists.

Its left-bank tributary the Petite Maine is also navigable over a length of 6 km (3.7 mi), up to the first disused lock and weir.
