= Saint-Hilaire-de-Clisson =

- Commune
- Location of Saint-Hilaire-de-Clisson
- Location within France Location within Pays de la Loire
- Coordinates: 47°03′47″N 1°18′30″W
- Country: France
- Region: Pays de la Loire
- Department: Loire-Atlantique
- Arrondissement: Nantes
- Canton: Clisson
- Intercommunality: CA Clisson Sèvre et Maine Agglo

Government
  - Mayor (2020–2026): Denis Thibaud
- Area^{1}: 18.43 km^{2} (7.12 sq mi)
- Elevation: 74 m (243 ft)
- Highest elevation: 54 m (177 ft)
- Lowest elevation: 22 m (72 ft)
- Population (2023): 2,423
  - Density: 131.5/km^{2} (340.5/sq mi)
- Time zone: UTC+01:00 (CET)
  - Summer (DST): UTC+02:00 (CEST)
- INSEE/Postal code: 44165 /44190
- ^{1} French Land Register data, which excludes lakes, ponds, glaciers > 1 km^{2} (0.386 sq mi or 247 acres) and river estuaries.

Saint-Hilaire-de-Clisson (French pronunciation: [sɛ̃.t‿ilɛʁ də klisɔ̃], literally Saint-Hilaire of Clisson; Breton: Sant-Eler-Neved) is a commune in the Loire-Atlantique department in western France.

== Population ==
Historical population
Year	Pop.	±% p.a.
1968	991	—
1975	964	−0.39%
1982	1,173	+2.84%
1990	1,334	+1.62%
1999	1,475	+1.12%
2007	1,840	+2.80%
2012	2,112	+2.80%
2017	2,285	+1.59%
2023	2,423	+0.98%
Source: INSEE

== See also ==
- Communes of the Loire-Atlantique department
