= Boussay, Loire-Atlantique =

Boussay Bóczaè (Gallo) Beuzid-Klison (Breton)
- Commune
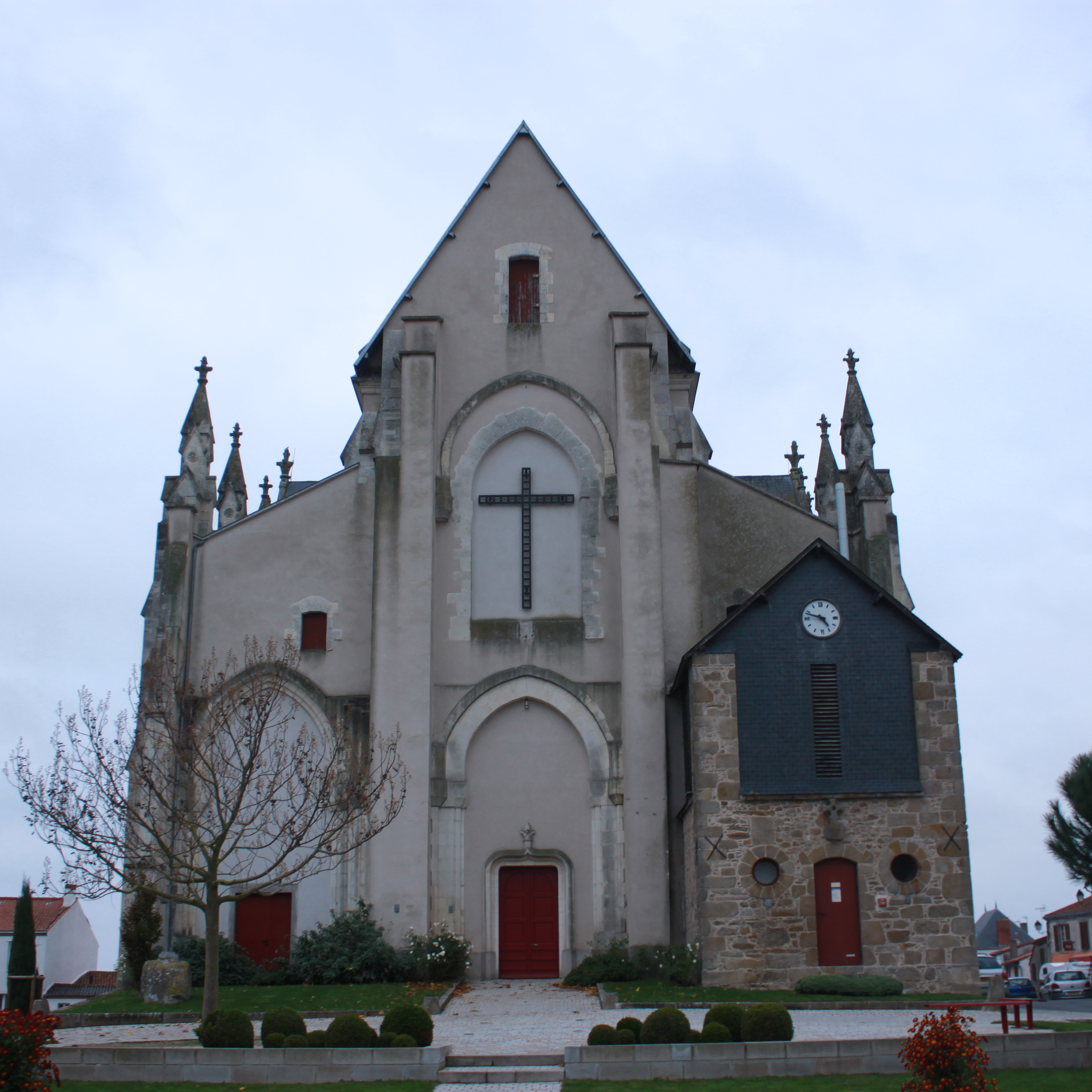

- Coat of arms
- Location of Boussay
- Location within France Location within Pays de la Loire
- Coordinates: 47°02′42″N 1°11′07″W
- Country: France
- Region: Pays de la Loire
- Department: Loire-Atlantique
- Arrondissement: Nantes
- Canton: Clisson
- Intercommunality: CA Clisson Sèvre et Maine Agglo

Government
  - Mayor (2020–2026): Véronique Neau-Redois
- Area^{1}: 26.45 km^{2} (10.21 sq mi)
- Highest elevation: 111 m (364 ft)
- Lowest elevation: 27 m (89 ft)
- Population (2023): 2,884
  - Density: 109.0/km^{2} (282.4/sq mi)
- Time zone: UTC+01:00 (CET)
  - Summer (DST): UTC+02:00 (CEST)
- INSEE/Postal code: 44022 /44190
- ^{1} French Land Register data, which excludes lakes, ponds, glaciers > 1 km^{2} (0.386 sq mi or 247 acres) and river estuaries.

Boussay (French pronunciation: [busɛ]; Gallo: Bóczaè, Breton: Beuzid-Klison) is a commune in the Loire-Atlantique department in western France.

== Population ==
Historical population

Year	Pop.	±% p.a.
1793	4,000	—
1821	1,651	−3.11%
1846	1,942	+0.65%
1872	2,047	+0.20%
1901	1,811	−0.42%
1926	1,637	−0.40%
1946	1,647	+0.03%
1962	2,061	+1.41%
1968	2,106	+0.36%

Year	Pop.	±% p.a.
1975	2,040	−0.45%
1982	2,161	+0.83%
1990	2,316	+0.87%
1999	2,361	+0.21%
2007	2,574	+1.09%
2012	2,692	+0.90%
2017	2,621	−0.53%
2023	2,884	+1.61%

Source: EHESS and INSEE (1968-2023)

== See also ==
- Communes of the Loire-Atlantique department
