= La Haie-Fouassière =

La Haie-Fouassière La Haè-Fóacierr (Gallo) An Hae-Foazer (Breton)
- Commune
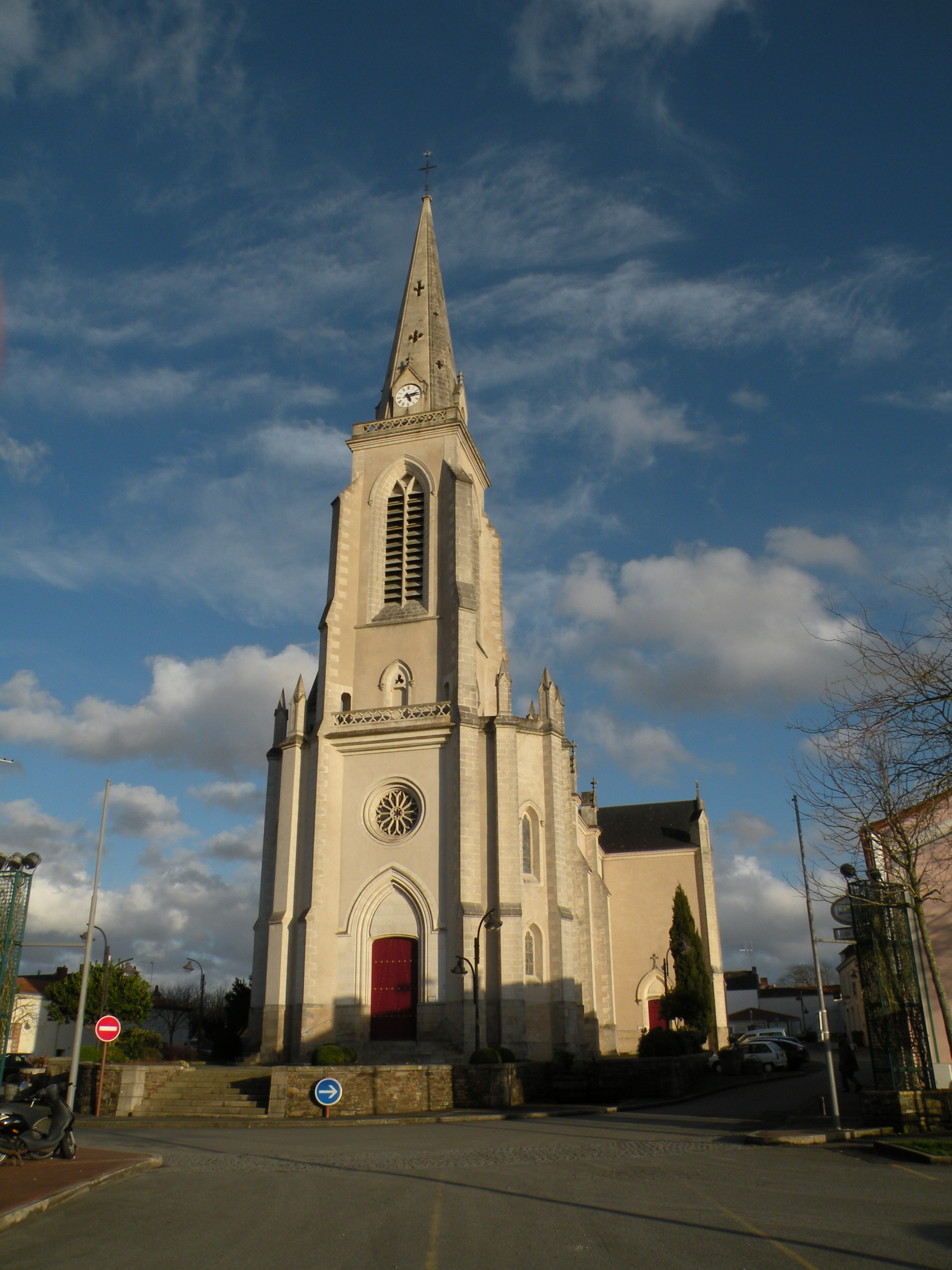

- Coat of arms
- Location of La Haie-Fouassière
- Location within France Location within Pays de la Loire
- Coordinates: 47°09′23″N 1°23′53″W
- Country: France
- Region: Pays de la Loire
- Department: Loire-Atlantique
- Arrondissement: Nantes
- Canton: Vertou
- Intercommunality: CA Clisson Sèvre et Maine Agglo

Government
  - Mayor (2020–2026): Vincent Magré
- Area^{1}: 11.81 km^{2} (4.56 sq mi)
- Highest elevation: 62 m (203 ft)
- Lowest elevation: 2 m (6.6 ft)
- Population (2023): 4,775
  - Density: 404.3/km^{2} (1,047/sq mi)
- Time zone: UTC+01:00 (CET)
  - Summer (DST): UTC+02:00 (CEST)
- INSEE/Postal code: 44070 /44690
- ^{1} French Land Register data, which excludes lakes, ponds, glaciers > 1 km^{2} (0.386 sq mi or 247 acres) and river estuaries.

La Haie-Fouassière (also spelled: La Haye-Fouassière, French pronunciation: [la ɛ fwasjɛʁ]; Gallo: La Haè-Fóacierr, Breton: An Hae-Foazer) is a commune in the Loire-Atlantique department in western France. La Haie-Fouassière station has rail connections to Clisson and Nantes.

== Population ==
Historical population

Year	Pop.	±% p.a.
1793	1,550	—
1821	1,566	+0.04%
1846	1,709	+0.35%
1872	1,796	+0.19%
1901	1,608	−0.38%
1926	1,555	−0.13%
1946	1,564	+0.03%
1962	1,813	+0.93%
1968	1,919	+0.95%

Year	Pop.	±% p.a.
1975	2,157	+1.68%
1982	2,674	+3.12%
1990	2,911	+1.07%
1999	3,337	+1.53%
2007	4,147	+2.75%
2012	4,399	+1.19%
2017	4,659	+1.16%
2023	4,775	+0.41%

Source: EHESS and INSEE (1968-2023)

== See also ==
- Communes of the Loire-Atlantique department
