= Vertou =

Vertou Vertou (Gallo) Gwerzhav (Breton)
- Commune
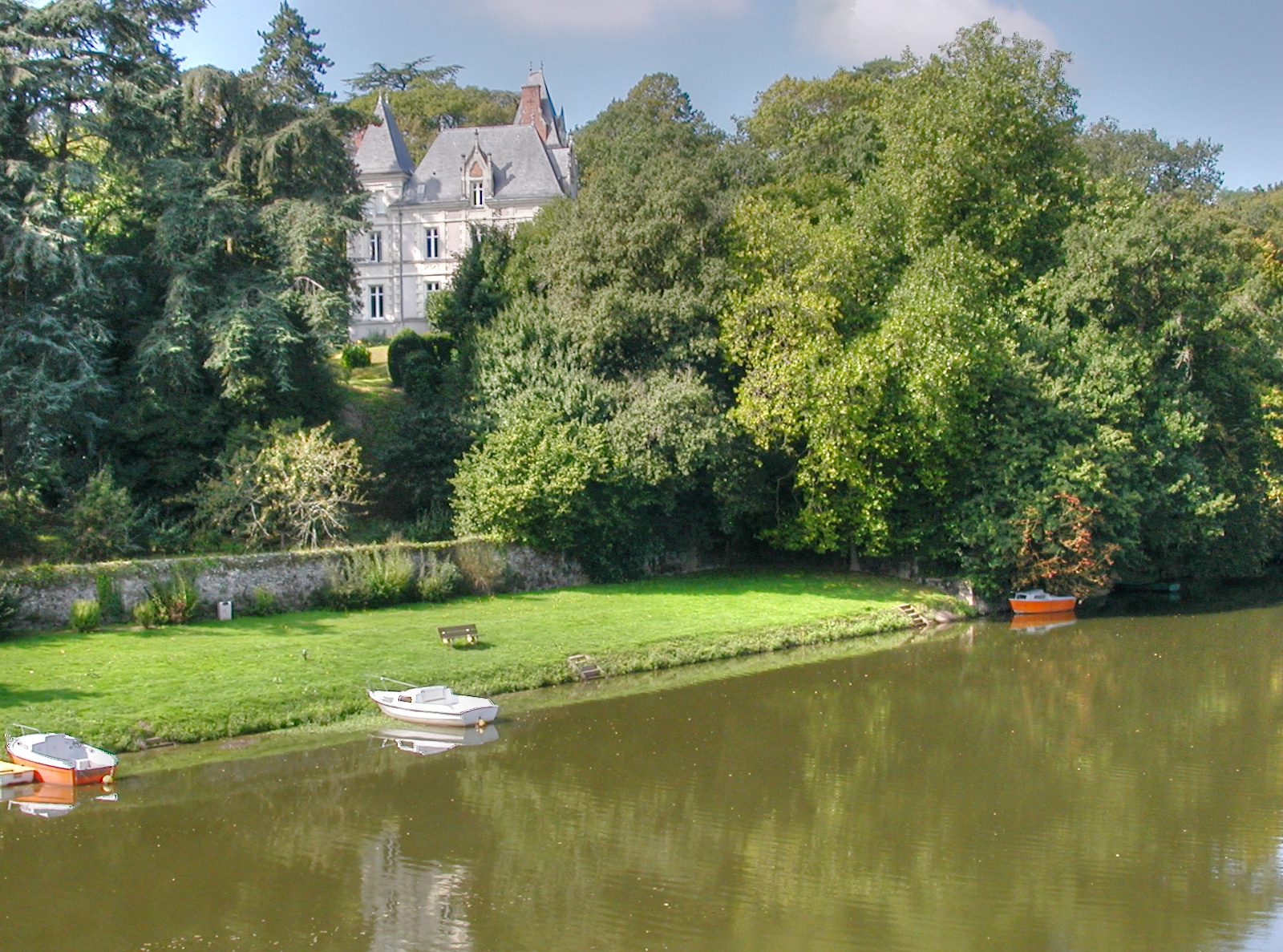
- The château du Portillon and the edge of the Sèvre Nantaise

- Coat of arms
- Location of Vertou
- Location within France Location within Pays de la Loire
- Coordinates: 47°10′08″N 1°28′11″W
- Country: France
- Region: Pays de la Loire
- Department: Loire-Atlantique
- Arrondissement: Nantes
- Canton: Vertou
- Intercommunality: Nantes Métropole

Government
  - Mayor (2020–2026): Rodolphe Amailland
- Area^{1}: 35.68 km^{2} (13.78 sq mi)
- Highest elevation: 56 m (184 ft)
- Lowest elevation: 1 m (3.3 ft)
- Population (2023): 26,227
  - Density: 735.1/km^{2} (1,904/sq mi)
- Time zone: UTC+01:00 (CET)
  - Summer (DST): UTC+02:00 (CEST)
- INSEE/Postal code: 44215 /44120
- ^{1} French Land Register data, which excludes lakes, ponds, glaciers > 1 km^{2} (0.386 sq mi or 247 acres) and river estuaries.

Vertou (French pronunciation: [vɛʁtu]; Breton: Gwerzhav) is a commune in the Loire-Atlantique department in western France.

It is located on the river Sèvre Nantaise, and was a historical town of Brittany.

Today, Vertou is a component of the Nantes Métropole and is the fifth-largest suburb of the city of Nantes, lying just southeast of Nantes. Vertou station has rail connections to Clisson and Nantes.

== History ==
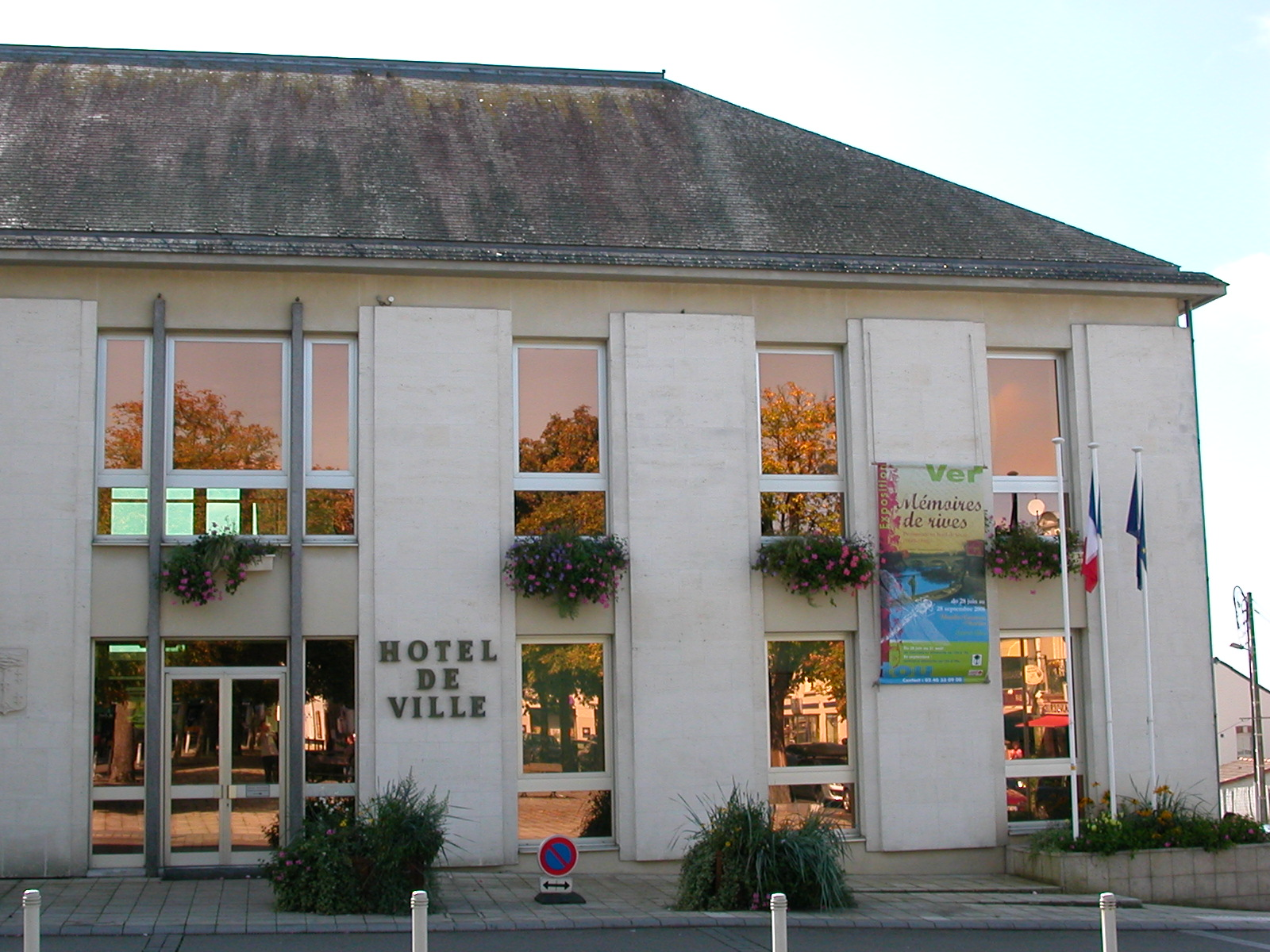
The Hôtel de Ville

The Hôtel de Ville was completed in 1974.

== Population ==
Historical population

| Year | Pop. | ±% p.a. |
|---|---|---|
| 1793 | 5,200 | — |
| 1800 | 3,260 | −6.45% |
| 1806 | 4,461 | +5.37% |
| 1821 | 5,773 | +1.73% |
| 1831 | 5,686 | −0.15% |
| 1841 | 5,635 | −0.09% |
| 1846 | 5,635 | +0.00% |
| 1851 | 5,949 | +1.09% |
| 1856 | 6,015 | +0.22% |
| 1861 | 6,313 | +0.97% |
| 1866 | 5,706 | −2.00% |
| 1872 | 5,588 | −0.35% |
| 1876 | 5,471 | −0.53% |
| 1881 | 5,376 | −0.35% |
| 1886 | 5,455 | +0.29% |
| 1891 | 5,602 | +0.53% |
| 1896 | 5,321 | −1.02% |
| 1901 | 5,388 | +0.25% |

| Year | Pop. | ±% p.a. |
|---|---|---|
| 1906 | 5,464 | +0.28% |
| 1911 | 5,490 | +0.09% |
| 1921 | 5,716 | +0.40% |
| 1926 | 6,142 | +1.45% |
| 1931 | 6,330 | +0.60% |
| 1936 | 6,877 | +1.67% |
| 1946 | 7,985 | +1.51% |
| 1954 | 9,223 | +1.82% |
| 1962 | 11,100 | +2.34% |
| 1968 | 12,089 | +1.43% |
| 1975 | 13,853 | +1.96% |
| 1982 | 15,631 | +1.74% |
| 1990 | 18,235 | +1.94% |
| 1999 | 20,268 | +1.18% |
| 2007 | 21,199 | +0.56% |
| 2012 | 22,307 | +1.02% |
| 2017 | 24,219 | +1.66% |
| 2023 | 26,227 | +1.34% |

Source: EHESS and INSEE (1968-2023)

== Twin towns – sister cities ==
Vertou is twinned with:

- Morges, Switzerland
- Poděbrady, Czech Republic

== See also ==
- Communes of the Loire-Atlantique department
