= Château-Thébaud =

Château-Thébaud Kastell-Tepaod (Breton)
- Commune
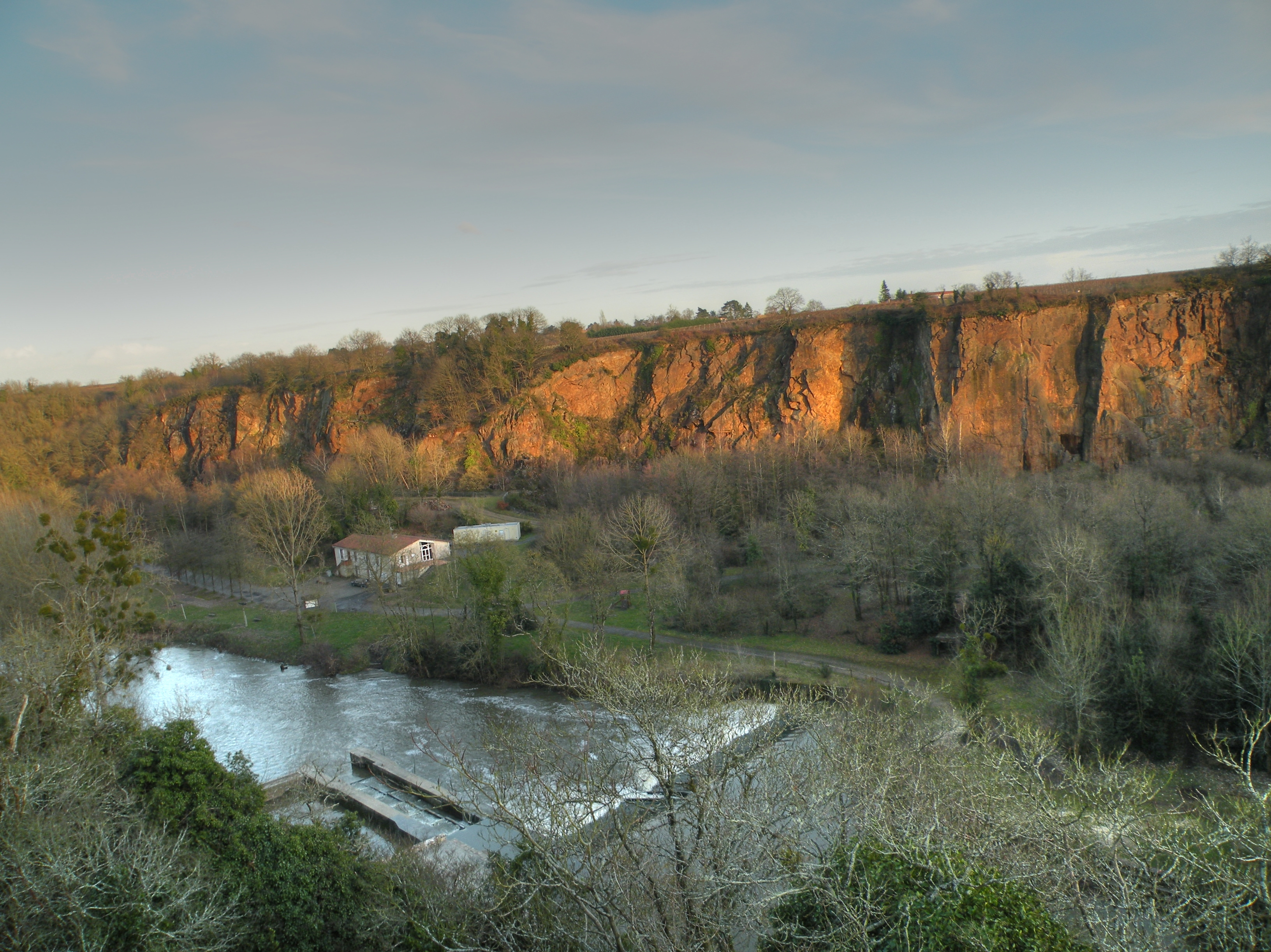
- Maine River at Pont-Caffino.

- Coat of arms
- Location of Château-Thébaud
- Location within France Location within Pays de la Loire
- Coordinates: 47°07′33″N 1°25′07″W
- Country: France
- Region: Pays de la Loire
- Department: Loire-Atlantique
- Arrondissement: Nantes
- Canton: Vertou
- Intercommunality: CA Clisson Sèvre et Maine Agglo

Government
  - Mayor (2020–2026): Alain Blaise
- Area^{1}: 17.64 km^{2} (6.81 sq mi)
- Highest elevation: 60 m (200 ft)
- Lowest elevation: 2 m (6.6 ft)
- Population (2023): 3,129
  - Density: 177.4/km^{2} (459.4/sq mi)
- Time zone: UTC+01:00 (CET)
  - Summer (DST): UTC+02:00 (CEST)
- INSEE/Postal code: 44037 /44690
- ^{1} French Land Register data, which excludes lakes, ponds, glaciers > 1 km^{2} (0.386 sq mi or 247 acres) and river estuaries.

Château-Thébaud (French: [ʃɑto tebo]; Breton: Kastell-Tepaod, before 1992: Châteauthébaud) is a commune in the Loire-Atlantique department in western France.

== Population ==
Historical population

Year	Pop.	±% p.a.
1793	1,610	—
1821	1,631	+0.05%
1846	1,793	+0.38%
1872	1,687	−0.23%
1901	1,489	−0.43%
1926	1,394	−0.26%
1946	1,330	−0.23%
1962	1,461	+0.59%
1968	1,377	−0.98%

Year	Pop.	±% p.a.
1975	1,573	+1.92%
1982	2,144	+4.52%
1990	2,357	+1.19%
1999	2,484	+0.58%
2007	2,771	+1.38%
2012	2,926	+1.09%
2017	3,026	+0.67%
2023	3,129	+0.56%

Source: EHESS and INSEE (1968-2023)

== See also ==
- Communes of the Loire-Atlantique department
