= Pont-Saint-Martin =

Pont-Saint-Martin may refer to:

- Pont Saint-Martin, a Roman bridge in the Aosta Valley, Italy
- Pont-Saint-Martin, Aosta Valley, a commune in the Aosta Valley, Italy
- Pont-Saint-Martin, Loire-Atlantique, a commune in the Loire-Atlantique department, France
