= Pont d'Aël =

Roman aqueduct in Aosta Valley, Italy

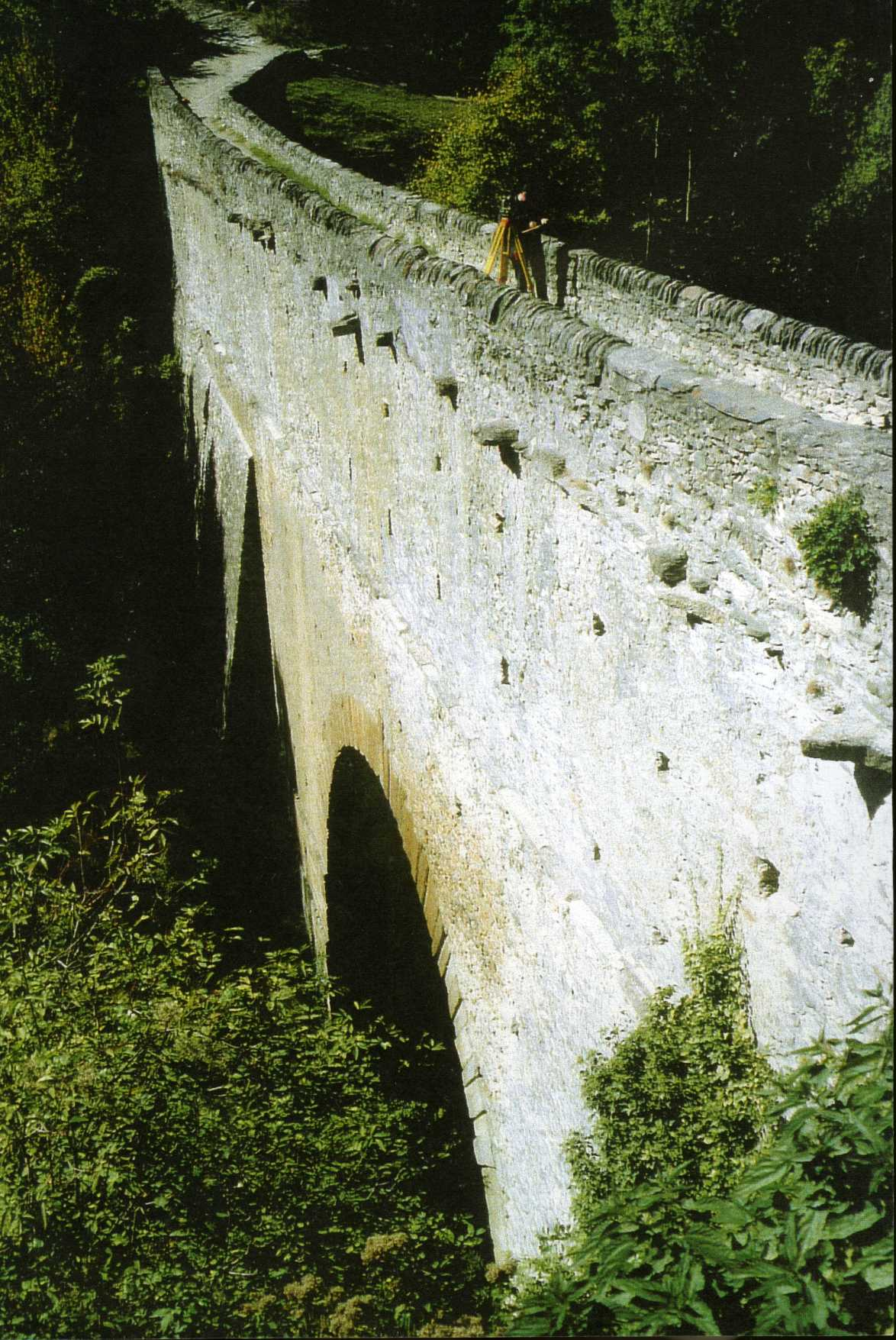
- Coordinates: 45.676667°N 7.222309°E
- Carries: Aqueduct to Augusta Prætoria Salassorum (Aosta)
- Crosses: Grand Eyvia
- Locale: Pont d'Aël, Aymavilles, Aosta Valley, Italy

Characteristics
- Design: Arch bridge
- Material: Stone
- Total length: 60.46 m
- Width: 2.26 m
- Height: 22.15 m
- Longest span: 14.24 m
- No. of spans: 1
- Clearance below: 66 m (from bridge deck to torrent)

History
- Construction end: 3 BC

Location
- Interactive map of Pont d'Aël

The Pont d'Aël (French pronunciation: [pɔ̃ dɛl]) is a Roman aqueduct located in a village of the same name in the comune of Aymavilles in Aosta Valley, northern Italy. It was built in the year 3 BC for irrigation purposes and supplying water for the newly founded colony of Augusta Praetoria, which is now known as Aosta. The water was directed through a neighbouring valley 66 m above the floor of the Aosta valley, through a sophisticated system. The aqueduct is 6 km long in total. In addition to its unusual position, the construction, which was originally thought to be a three-story structure, shows more unique features such as a control corridor below the water line, as well as explicit private funding. Today, the water channel of the aqueduct serves as a public walking trail.

Besides the Pont d'Aël, two other Roman bridges in the Aosta valley are still intact: the Pont Saint-Martin in the town of the same name and the Pont de Pierre in Aosta.

== Research and function ==
The bridge traverses the Grand Eyvia river at Pont d’Aël next to the entrance to the Cogne Valley, 8 km West of Aosta. Pingone recorded the first description, along with a sketch in the year 1550. Further illustrations were contributed by Baron de Malzen in 1826 and Aubert in 1860, which already showed the construction in its present form. Barocelli added measurements from 1864 after excavations on the eastern edge of the bridge in 1930.

A complete survey and documentation was first carried out in 1996 by Mathias Döring. Here it was discovered that the bridge was used to transport iron ore, as previously thought, but belonged to the growing colony of Augusta Praetoria Salassorum (modern Aosta), used as an irrigation pipeline for agricultural land and a washery for the iron ore in Cogne. The idea of it being a water supply for Augusta Praetoria was ruled out, because the town itself is supplied from the nearby river Buthier. Nevertheless, the water may have also been used, in addition to its main economic function, to meet local drinking water needs.

== Irrigation line ==
One end of the 6 km long pipeline opened onto a 200 hectare farm situated in west Aosta, 50 to 150 m above the main river Dora Baltea using a gradient line from the neighbouring valley. On the way the water was diverted for ore washing, probably located near the village of Aymavilles. The technical difficulties in laying the pipeline along the steep rock faces of the Cogne valley were solved by the Roman engineers by using a gravity pipeline. The water from the Grand Eyvia, which is diverted 2.9 km above the Pont d’Aël, was directed downhill onto the steep slopes of the Cogne valley in open channels with an average gradient of 6.6 per mille. Tunnels or qanats were formed due to the hard rockface. The 1.20-metre-wide (3.9 ft) line was cut as a half-gallery in the rocky slope, so that a parapet, up to 3 m high, was formed that ended in the bedrock on the valley side. The advantage of this method was that unlike a normal tunneling process, the tunneling work could start at any number of points because it was easily visible. This meant there was a significant decrease in the construction time. Such half-galleries in Roman engineering can only be found rarely in particularly rough terrain, such as at the water line of Side in Turkey.

In the flatter areas they decided on a two to four meter wide terrace, through which the line ran as a rectangular brick canal with cover tiles. Overall the line traverses 2.25 km down a slope and then 0.6 km down a rocky path to Pont d'Aël. The other pipeline underneath the bridge could not be investigated because of construction and agricultural use; the end point could possibly be situated in the said irrigation zone in what is today known as the village of Aymavilles.

== Construction ==
The 60.46-metre-long (198.4 ft) and 2.26-metre-wide (7.4 ft) bridge is the only possible crossing point over the 4-kilometre-long (2.5 mi) and up to 150-metre-deep (490 ft) canyon of the Grand Eyvia. Its only arch spans the gorge, which here is only 12 m wide but 66 m deep, with a span of 14.24 m. The bridge arch consists of a single key stone. On the lower floor of the bridge, which was once probably three stories high, a 50.35-metre-long (165.2 ft) corridor served to verify the density of the overlying water pipe in antiquity. On both sides of this 3.88-meter-high (12.7 ft) control corridor there are two rows of small windows from which the lower floor and the upper ceiling are illuminated so that the bridge keeper could quickly identify leaking water, which could have damaged the stonework with frost. Döring was able to prove beyond reasonable doubt the existence of the ancient aqueduct, where the trail runs today, on the basis of the altitude and course of the preserved remains of the walls, as well as a subsequent tunnel west of the bridge. It was 1.90 m high and 1.0 m wide. At the time the third floor was possibly an open walkway, which gave the building a total height of 22.15 m.

== Bridge inscription ==
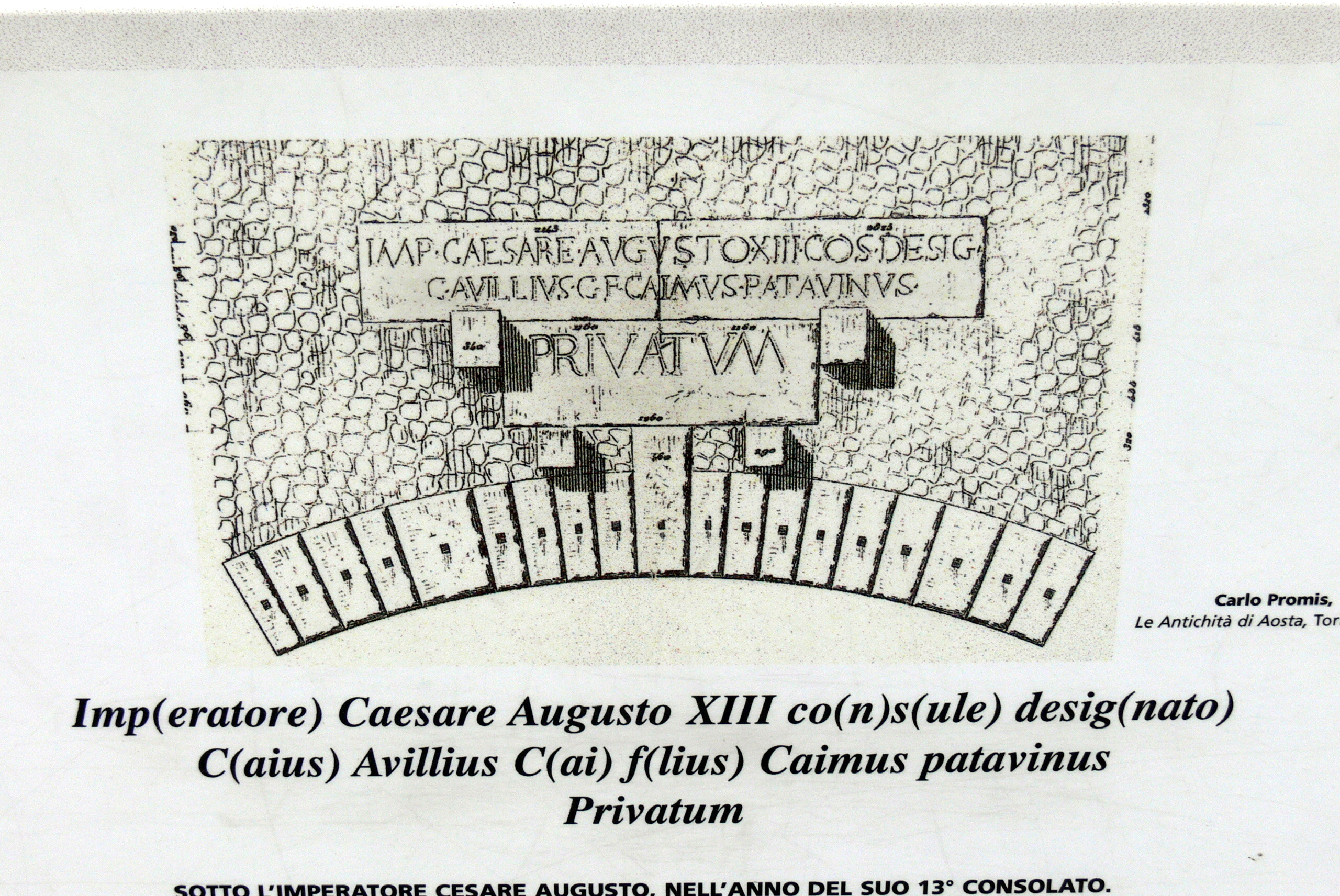

IMP CAESARE AVGVSTO XIII COS DESIG
C AVILLIVS C F CAIMVS PATAVINVS
PRIVATVM

Completed:

Imperatore Caesare Augusto XIII consule designato
Caius Avillius Cai filius Caimus Patavinus
Privatum

Translated:

"When emperor Caesar Augustus was consul for the 13th time
Caius Avillius Caimus son of Caius from Padua [built this bridge]"
"using private funds"

== Sources ==
- Döring, Mathias (1997), "Die römische Wasserleitung von Pondel im Val d'Aosta/Italien. Bestandsaufnahme des Bauwerks aus dem Jahre 3 v. Chr.", Mitteilungen des Instituts für Wasserbau und Wasserwirtschaft, Technische Universität Darmstadt, vol. 101
- Döring, Mathias (1998), "Die römische Wasserleitung von Pondel (Aostatal)", Antike Welt, vol. 29, no. 2, pp. 127–134

== See also ==
- Roman bridge
- List of Roman bridges
- Roman architecture
- Roman engineering
