= Saint-Colomban =

Saint-Colomban may refer to:

- Saint-Colomban, Loire-Atlantique, commune in the Loire-Atlantique department in western France
- Saint-Colomban, Quebec, city in the regional county municipality of La Rivière-du-Nord in Québec, Canada
- Saint-Colomban-des-Villards, commune in the Savoie department in the Auvergne-Rhône-Alpes region in south-eastern France
