= Chase County National Bank =

Historic building in Kansas, United States

- U.S. National Register of Historic Places
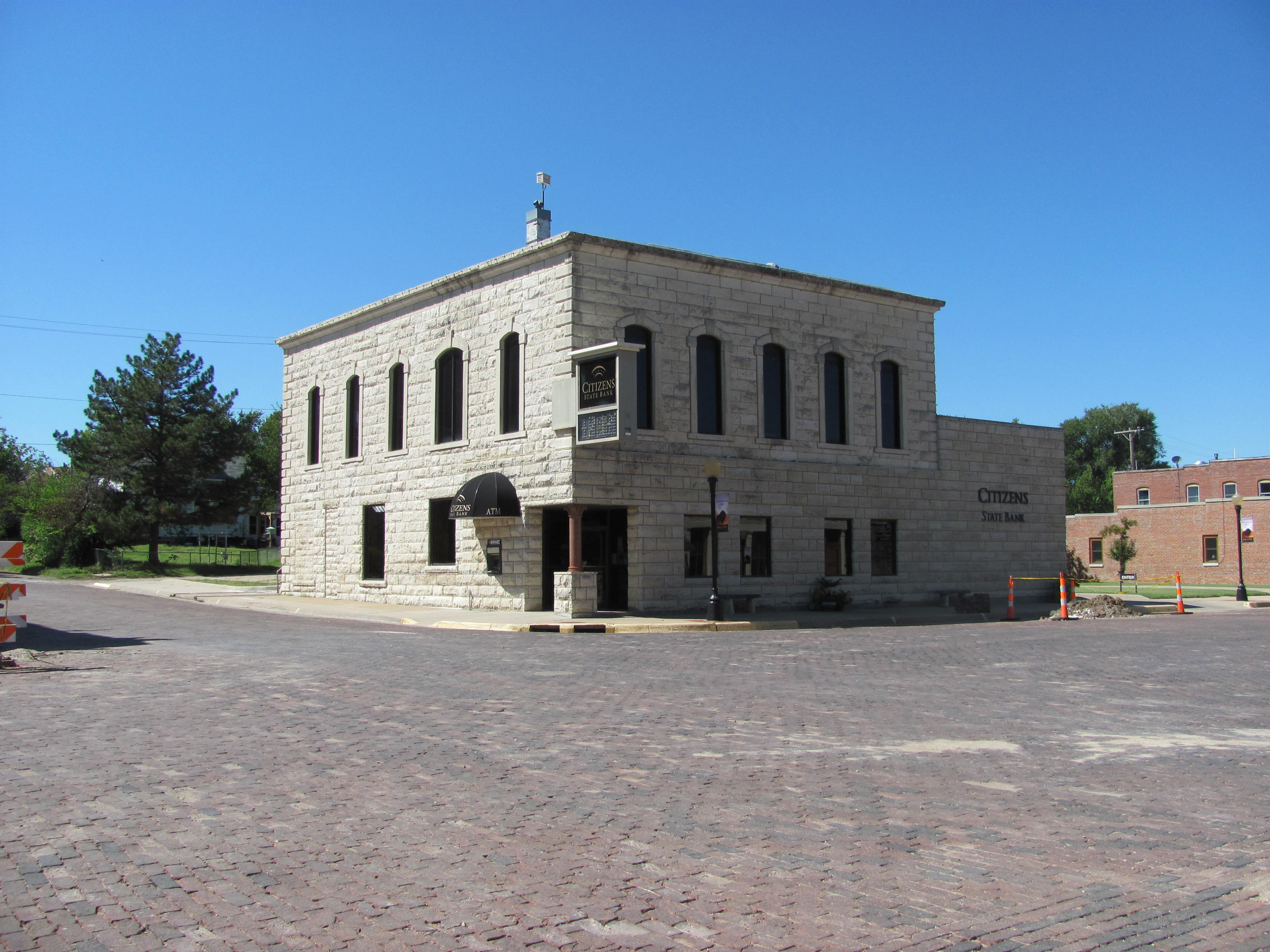

- Location within Kansas
- Location: 301 Broadway, Cottonwood Falls, Kansas
- Coordinates: 38°22′19″N 96°32′30″W
- Area: less than one acre
- Built: 1882
- Built by: David Rettiger
- NRHP reference No.: 77000572
- Added to NRHP: November 9, 1977

The Chase County National Bank is a historic bank building at 301 Broadway in Cottonwood Falls, Chase County, Kansas. The bank was established in 1882 by a group of local businessmen; A. S. Howard was its first president, and eight others sat on its initial board of directors. While the bank took up temporary residence in a drugstore for its first few months of operation, its directors began construction on a dedicated building shortly after forming, and the bank building opened on December 10, 1882. Local stonemason David Rettiger designed the two-story building, which features segmental arched windows, stone stringcourses, and a cornice at the roof line. Rettiger used a matching design for the 1888 Cartter Building, which is across the street from the bank. The bank failed in 1928 due to an embezzlement case against its president and poor management, leading to a bank run. The building has since housed insurance and real estate companies, the Farm Bureau, a World War II ration office, the Chase County Historical Society, and a second bank.

The building was added to the National Register of Historic Places on November 9, 1977.
