= Building at 1929–1931 Sherman Avenue =

- U.S. National Register of Historic Places
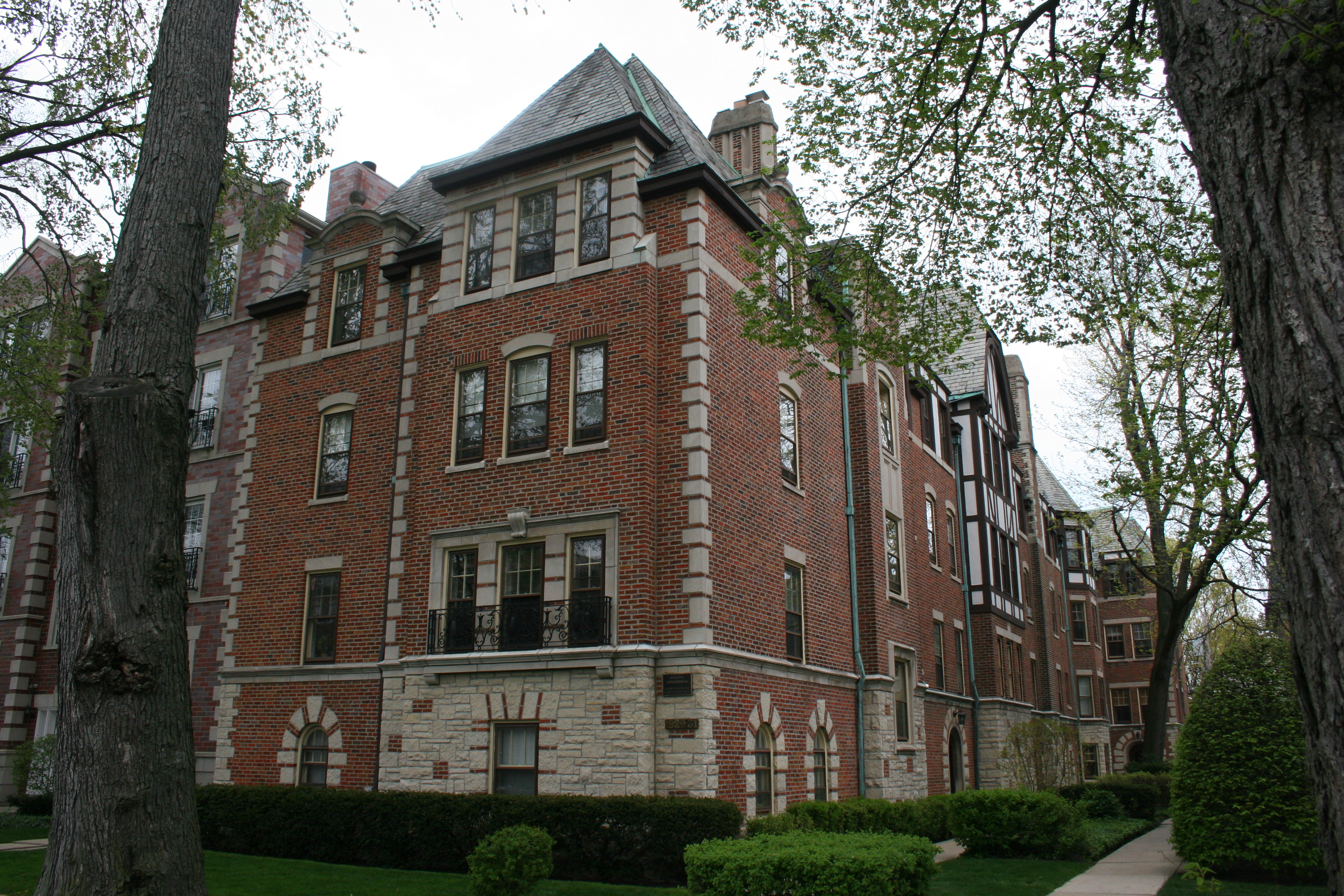
- Building at 1929-1931 Sherman Ave. in 2012

- Location within Chicago metropolitan area Location within Illinois Location within the United States
- Location: 1929–1931 Sherman Ave., Evanston, Illinois
- Coordinates: 42°03′12″N 87°40′54″W
- Area: 0.5 acres (0.20 ha)
- Built: 1928
- Architect: Maher & McGrew
- Architectural style: Tudor Revival
- MPS: Suburban Apartment Buildings in Evanston TR
- NRHP reference No.: 84000978
- Added to NRHP: March 15, 1984

The Building at 1929–1931 Sherman Avenue is a historic apartment building in Evanston, Illinois. The three-story brick building was built in 1928. The building has an L-shaped layout with a half courtyard, a relatively common layout for Evanston's apartments. Architects Maher and McGrew, who designed several other buildings in Evanston, designed the building in the Tudor Revival style. The building's design features large sections of rough limestone on the basement level, limestone quoins, segmental arched windows, half-timbering, and a series of gables and dormers at the roof line.

The building was added to the National Register of Historic Places on March 15, 1984.
