= Carcassonne Airport =

Airport in southern France

Carcassonne Airport Aéroport de Carcassonne
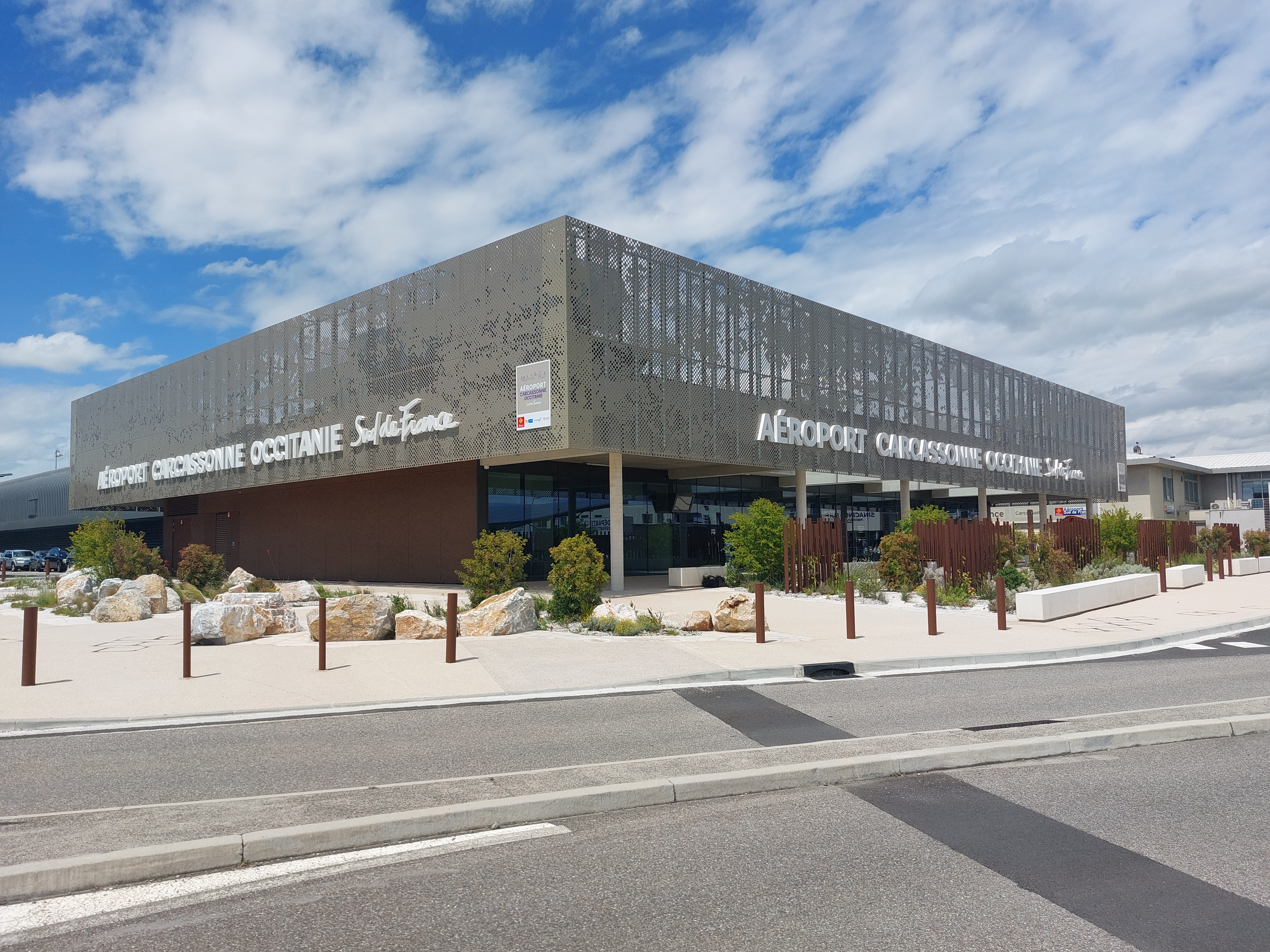
- IATA: CCF; ICAO: LFMK

Summary
- Airport type: Public
- Operator: Transdev
- Serves: Carcassonne, France
- Elevation AMSL: 434 ft (132 m)
- Coordinates: 43°12′57″N 002°18′31″E
- Website: Carcassonne Airport

Map
- Location of airport in Occitanie region LFMK (France)

Runways
Direction	Length		Surface
Direction	m	ft	Surface
09/27	2,050	6,726	Asphalt
09L/27R	800	2,625	Grass

Statistics (2014)
- Passengers: 413,724
- Passenger change 13-14: ▼4.4%
- Sources: French AIP, UAF, DAFIF

Carcassonne Airport (French: Aéroport de Carcassonne, IATA: CCF, ICAO: LFMK) serves Carcassonne and southern Languedoc and is in the Aude department of the Occitanie region in France. It is 3 km (2 nautical miles) west of the city and is also known as Salvaza Airport, Carcassonne Salvaza Airport or Carcassonne Airport in Pays Cathare (Aéroport de Carcassonne en Pays Cathare). The airport handles commercial national and international flights as well as private, non-regular air traffic.

== History ==
In 1993, according to the Official Airline Guide (OAG) Carcassonne was served by Aigle Azur airlines with nonstop service to Paris Orly Airport operated with Saab 340 regional turboprop airliners. During the late 1990s, the airport was being served with budget flights to and from European airports, and by 2006 had regular flight connections with Dublin, London Stansted, Liverpool, East Midlands and Charleroi. In 2011, the airport served 368,000 passengers.

Atlas Atlantique Airlines operated from the airport briefly to Oran in Algeria from 2016 to 2017; however, the airline ceased operations in late November 2017. Ryanair is the only airline currently operating scheduled passenger service into the airport.

== Facilities ==
The airport sits at an elevation of 434 feet (132 m) above mean sea level. It has one paved runway designated, which measures 2,050 by 45 metres (6,726 ft × 148 ft). It also has a parallel unpaved runway with a grass surface measuring 800 by 30 metres (2,625 ft × 98 ft). It can cater to aircraft operating under VFR. Inside the terminal building there are two departure gates. A small shop is land-side in the terminal.

A campus of the École nationale de l'aviation civile is also at the airport.

== Airlines and destinations ==
The following airlines operate regular scheduled and charter flights at Carcassonne Airport:

Airlines	Destinations
Ryanair	Brussels–Charleroi, London–Stansted, Manchester; Seasonal: Bournemouth, Cagliari, Cork, Dublin, East Midlands, Porto, Tangier

== Ground transportation ==
There is a shuttle bus service from the airport to the centre of Carcassonne and Carcassonne Station, which runs to coincide with the arrivals of flights.
