= Raymond Vautherin =

Italian linguist, poet and playwright

- Born: 18 September 1935; La Thuile, Italy
- Died: 11 February 2018 (aged 82); Aymavilles, Italy
- Occupations: Linguist, poet, playwright

Raymond Vautherin (La Thuile, 18 September 1935 – Aymavilles, 11 February 2018) was a French-speaking Italian linguist, poet and playwright. He wrote plays and poetry in Valdôtain dialect.

== Early life ==
Raymond Vautherin was born on 18 September 1935 in La Thuile. After his father died, he moved to Pont d'Aël, Aymavilles.

== Career ==
Vautherin wrote poetry in Valdôtain dialect, locally called patois, from the Aosta Valley. As a member of the Comité des Traditions Valdôtaines, he authored several plays in this patois and revived Charaban, the local theatre company in patois. He also translated the Book of Proverbs and The Little Prince into patois. From 1975 to his death, he was the editor-in-chief of Lo Flambò, the official magazine of the committee.

He was also a member of the Valdotainian academic society Académie Saint-Anselme.

== Death ==
Vautherin died on 11 February 2018 in Aymavilles.

== Selected works ==
- Adjeu poésia (1957)
- Lo Cardeleun (1959)
