= Cartter Building =

- U.S. National Register of Historic Places
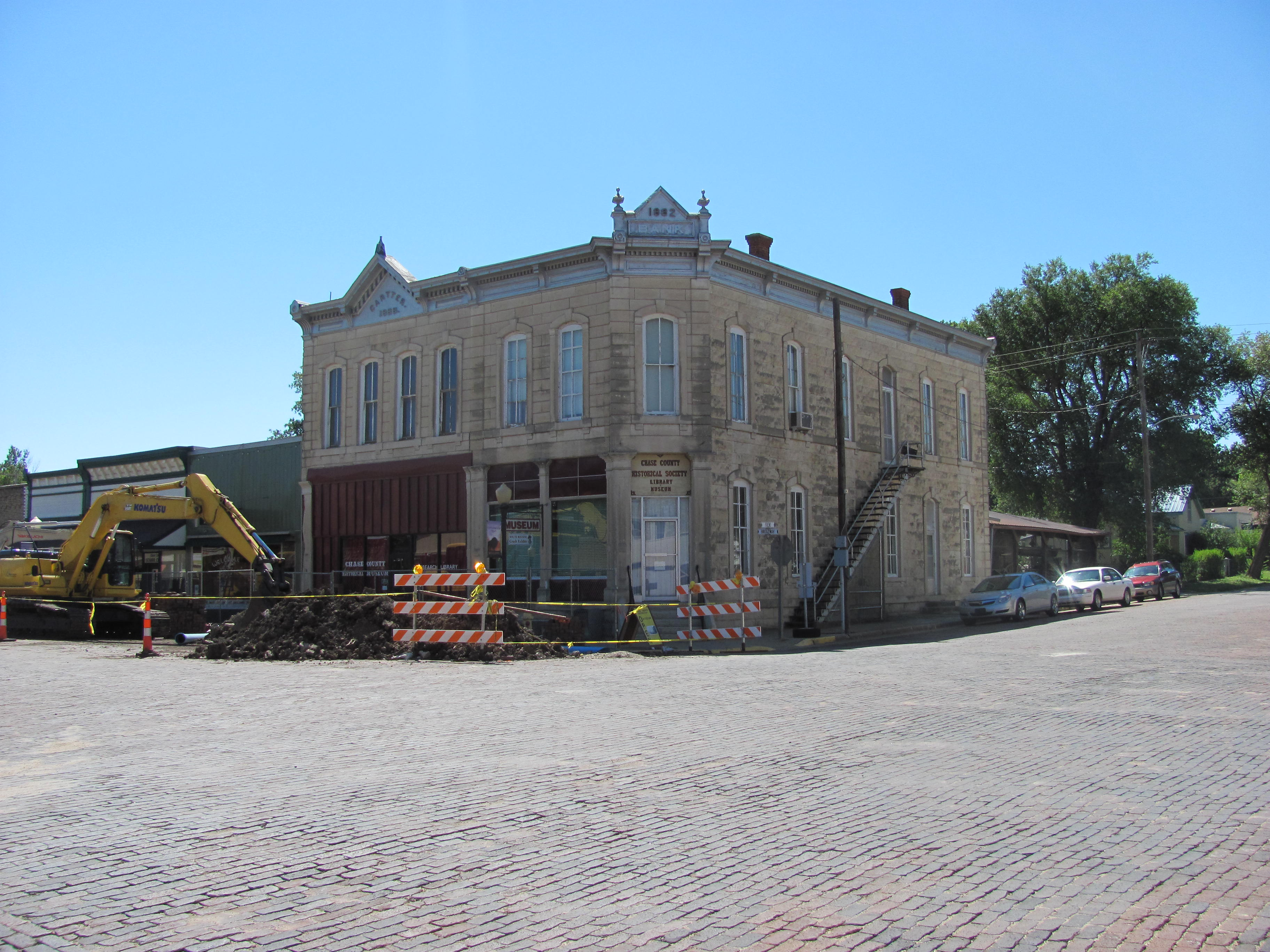

- Location within Kansas
- Location: 303 Broadway, Cottonwood Falls, Kansas
- Coordinates: 38°22′19″N 96°32′30″W
- Area: less than one acre
- Built: 1888
- Built by: David Rettiger
- NRHP reference No.: 77000573
- Added to NRHP: November 23, 1977

The Cartter Building is a historic commercial building at 303 Broadway in Cottonwood Falls, Kansas. Local businessman and rancher Dr. William H. Cartter had the building constructed in 1888. The two-story building housed Cartter's grocery store on the first floor and had a meeting hall, which was used by the local Freemasons and Odd Fellows, on the second floor. Builder David Rettiger designed the stone building to match the neighboring Chase County National Bank, which he had built six years earlier. The building's design includes a pedimented metal cornice, segmental arched windows, and stone banding; it originally featured an arcade along the storefront as well.

The building was added to the National Register of Historic Places on November 23, 1977.
