= Segmented arch =

Segmented arch can mean:

- Arch bridge, a type of bridge having one or more arches
- Segmental arch, in architecture, a type of arch that is struck from one or more centers below the springer, resulting in an arch that is less than a semicircle
