= Saint-Lumine-de-Coutais =

- Commune
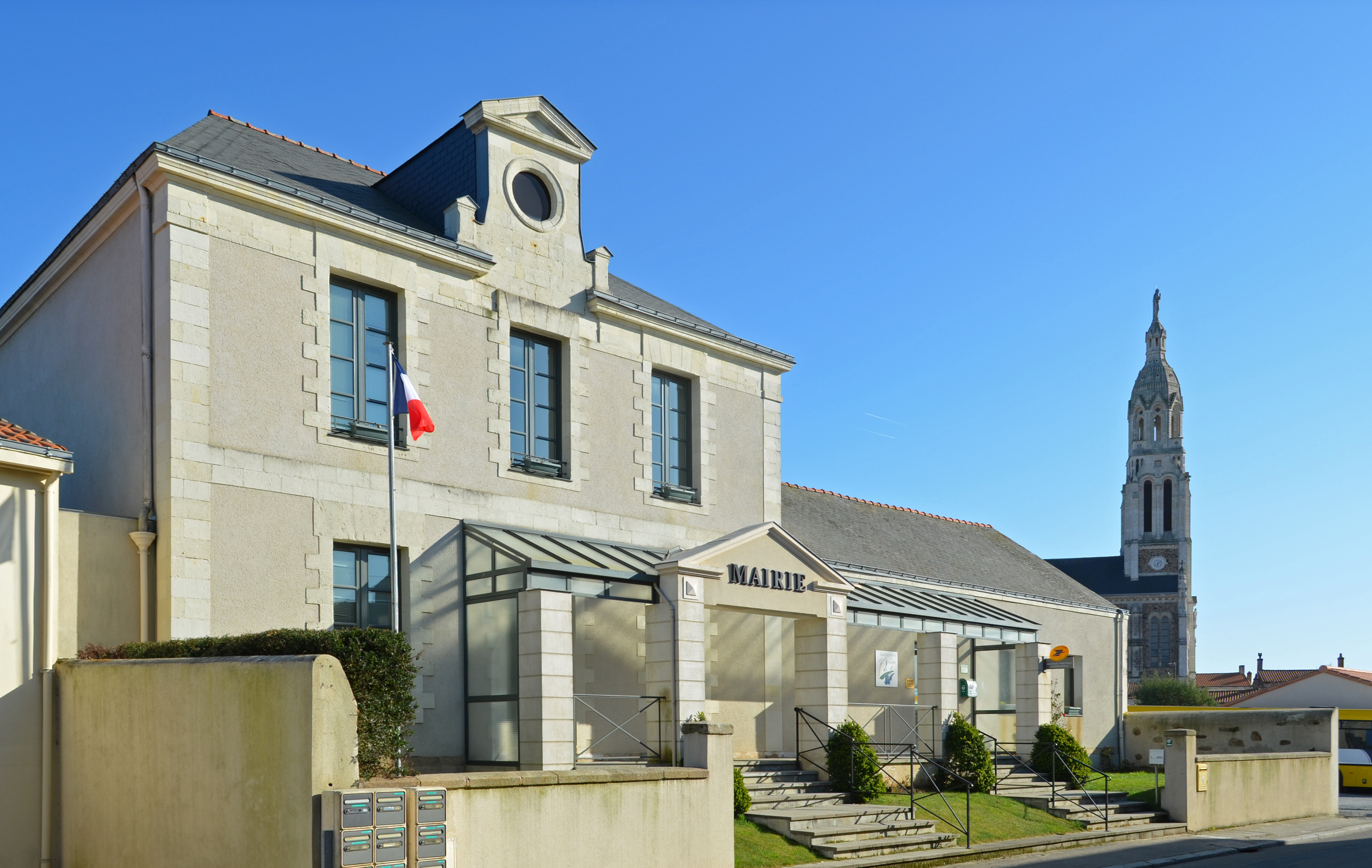
- The town hall in Saint-Lumine-de-Coutais

- Coat of arms
- Location of Saint-Lumine-de-Coutais
- Location within France Location within Pays de la Loire
- Coordinates: 47°03′19″N 1°43′31″W
- Country: France
- Region: Pays de la Loire
- Department: Loire-Atlantique
- Arrondissement: Nantes
- Canton: Saint-Philbert-de-Grand-Lieu
- Intercommunality: Grand Lieu

Government
  - Mayor (2020–2026): Bernard Coudriau
- Area^{1}: 17.64 km^{2} (6.81 sq mi)
- Elevation: 22 m (72 ft)
- Highest elevation: 48 m (157 ft)
- Lowest elevation: 1 m (3.3 ft)
- Population (2023): 2,396
  - Density: 135.8/km^{2} (351.8/sq mi)
- Time zone: UTC+01:00 (CET)
  - Summer (DST): UTC+02:00 (CEST)
- INSEE/Postal code: 44174 /44310
- ^{1} French Land Register data, which excludes lakes, ponds, glaciers > 1 km^{2} (0.386 sq mi or 247 acres) and river estuaries.

Saint-Lumine-de-Coutais (French pronunciation: [sɛ̃ lymin də kutɛ]; Breton: Sant-Leven-ar-C'hoad) is a commune in the Loire-Atlantique department in western France.

== Population ==
Historical population
Year	Pop.	±% p.a.
1968	954	—
1975	1,015	+0.89%
1982	1,080	+0.89%
1990	1,175	+1.06%
1999	1,335	+1.43%
2007	1,778	+3.65%
2012	1,969	+2.06%
2017	2,162	+1.89%
2023	2,396	+1.73%
Source: INSEE

== See also ==
- Communes of the Loire-Atlantique department
