= Canton of Saint-Philbert-de-Grand-Lieu =

Coordinates: 47.04°N 1.64°W

The canton of Saint-Philbert-de-Grand-Lieu is an administrative division of the Loire-Atlantique department, western France. Its borders were modified at the French canton reorganisation which came into effect in March 2015. Its seat is in Saint-Philbert-de-Grand-Lieu.

It consists of the following communes:

1. Le Bignon
2. La Chevrolière
3. Corcoué-sur-Logne
4. Geneston
5. Legé
6. La Limouzinière
7. Montbert
8. Pont-Saint-Martin
9. Saint-Colomban
10. Saint-Lumine-de-Coutais
11. Saint-Philbert-de-Grand-Lieu
12. Touvois
