= Montbert =

Montbert Montebèrt (Gallo) Monteverzh (Breton)
- Commune
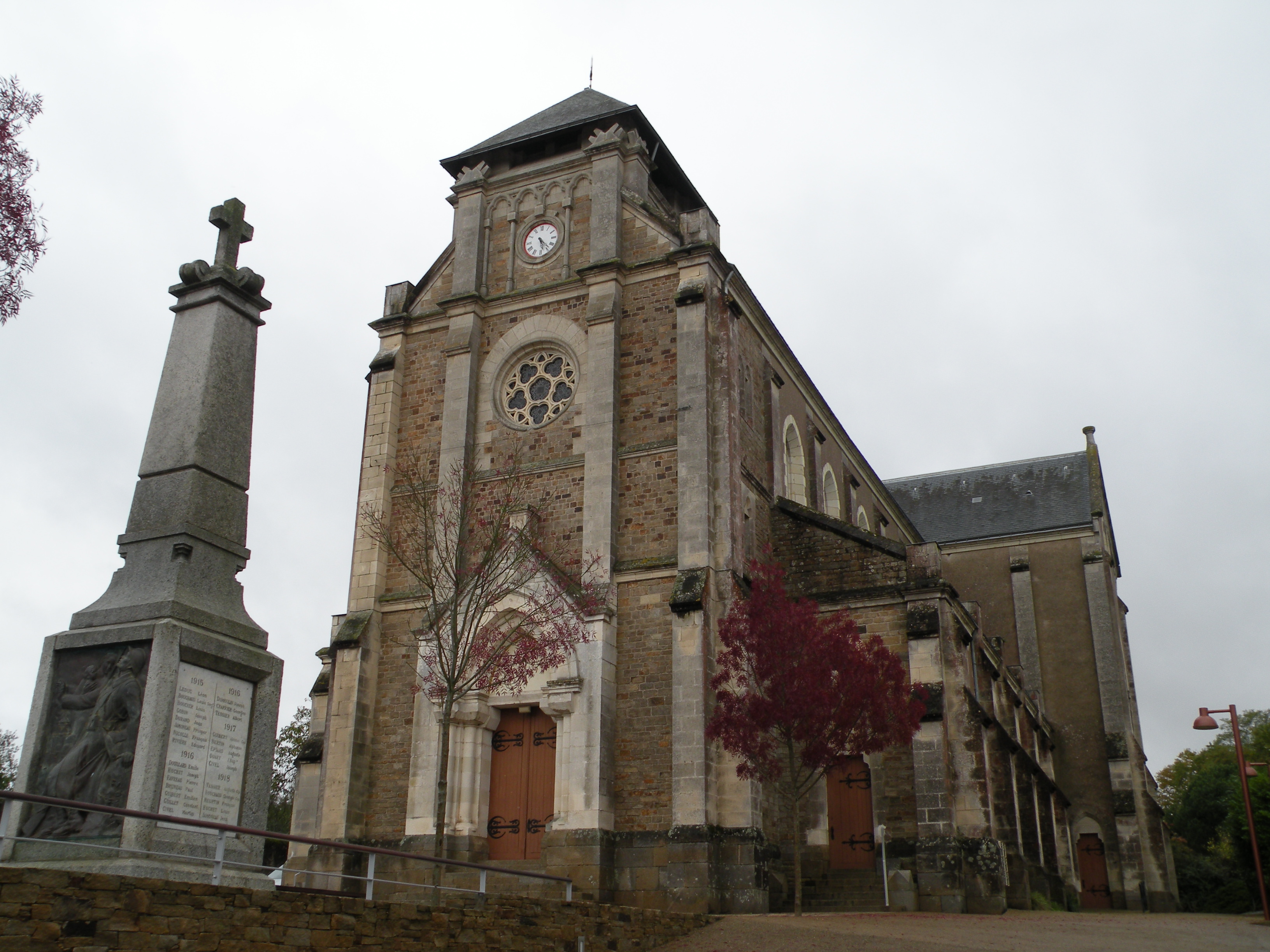

- Coat of arms
- Location of Montbert
- Location within France Location within Pays de la Loire
- Coordinates: 47°03′31″N 1°29′16″W
- Country: France
- Region: Pays de la Loire
- Department: Loire-Atlantique
- Arrondissement: Nantes
- Canton: Saint-Philbert-de-Grand-Lieu
- Intercommunality: Grand Lieu

Government
  - Mayor (2020–2026): Jean-Jacques Mirallié
- Area^{1}: 28.24 km^{2} (10.90 sq mi)
- Highest elevation: 51 m (167 ft)
- Lowest elevation: 7 m (23 ft)
- Population (2023): 3,388
  - Density: 120.0/km^{2} (310.7/sq mi)
- Time zone: UTC+01:00 (CET)
  - Summer (DST): UTC+02:00 (CEST)
- INSEE/Postal code: 44102 /44140
- ^{1} French Land Register data, which excludes lakes, ponds, glaciers > 1 km^{2} (0.386 sq mi or 247 acres) and river estuaries.

Montbert (French pronunciation: [mɔ̃bɛʁ]; Gallo: Montebèrt, Breton: Monteverzh) is a commune in the Loire-Atlantique department in western France. In 1954 it ceded part of its territory to the new commune of Geneston.

== Population ==
Historical population

Year	Pop.	±% p.a.
1806	1,528	—
1821	2,265	+2.66%
1846	2,430	+0.28%
1872	2,509	+0.12%
1901	2,557	+0.07%
1926	2,211	−0.58%
1946	2,205	−0.01%
1962	1,585	−2.04%
1968	1,614	+0.30%

Year	Pop.	±% p.a.
1975	1,734	+1.03%
1982	2,249	+3.78%
1990	2,246	−0.02%
1999	2,296	+0.24%
2007	2,874	+2.85%
2012	2,986	+0.77%
2017	3,125	+0.91%
2023	3,388	+1.36%

Source: EHESS and INSEE (1968-2023)

== See also ==
- Communes of the Loire-Atlantique department
