= Covelo, Pontevedra =

Municipality in Galicia, Spain

Concello de Covelo
- municipality
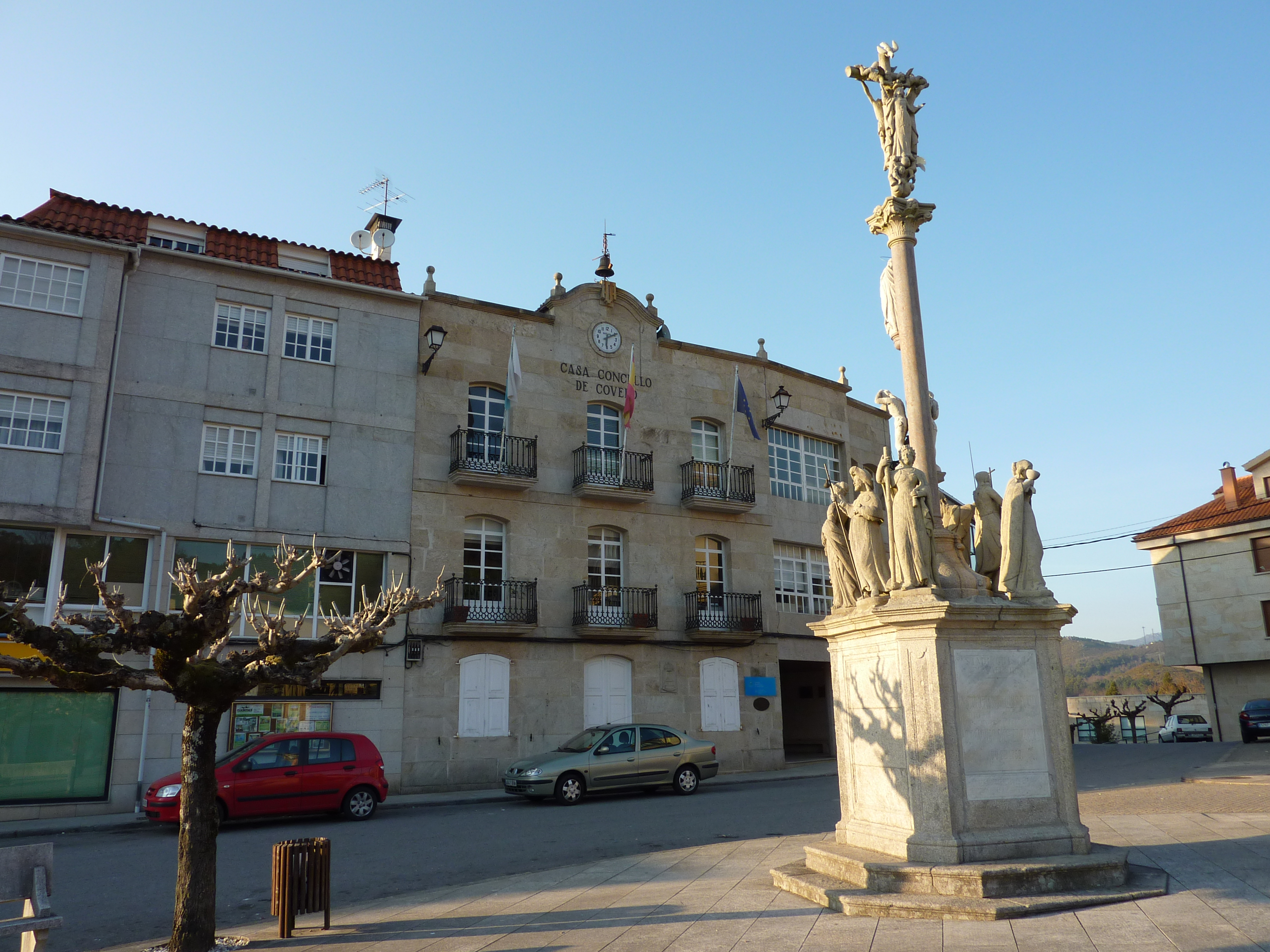

- Coat of arms

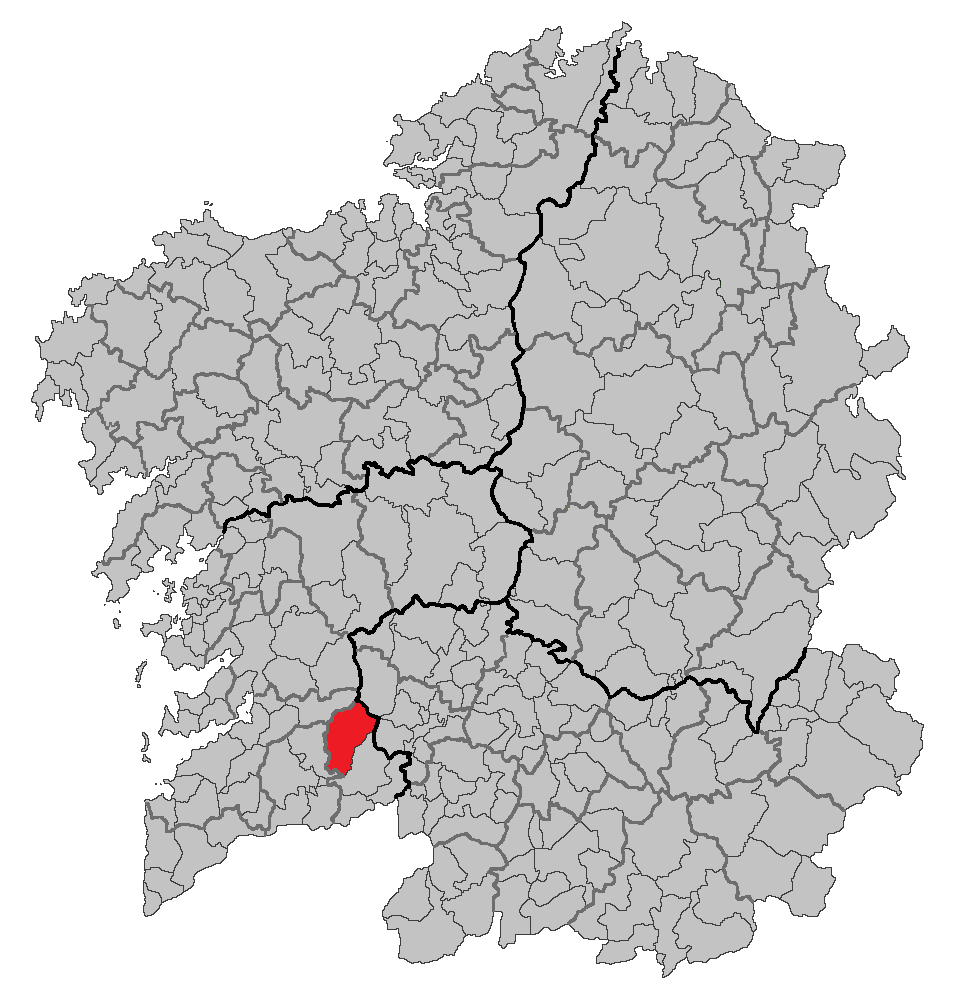
- Location of Covelo within Galicia
- Coordinates: 42°13′54″N 8°21′48″W
- Country: Spain
- Autonomous community: Galicia
- Province: Pontevedra
- Comarca: A Paradanta

Population (2025-01-01)
  - Total: 2,472
- (INE)
- Time zone: UTC+1 (CET)
  - Summer (DST): UTC+2 (CET)

Covelo is a municipality in Galicia, Spain, in the province of Pontevedra. It is part of the Galician comarca of A Paradanta.

== Twin towns - Sister cities ==
Geneston is twinned with:

- Geneston, Loire-Atlantique, France

== See also ==
- List of municipalities in Pontevedra
