= Pont de Pierre (Aosta) =

Roman segmental arch bridge

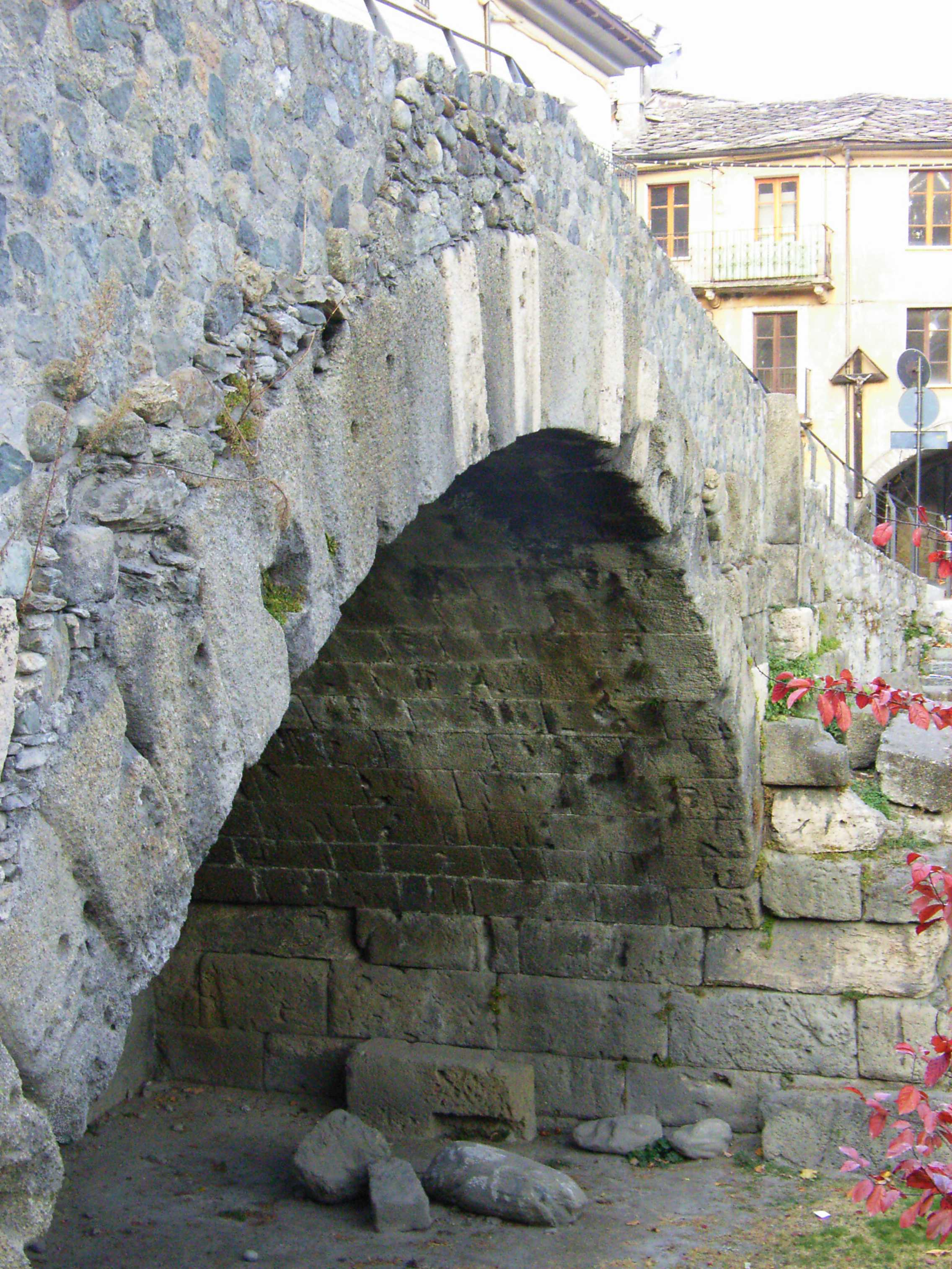
- The single arched Pont de Pierre
- Coordinates: 45.739675°N 7.329984°E
- Carries: Connection Po Valley-Gaul
- Crosses: Buthier
- Locale: Aosta, Aosta Valley, Italy

Characteristics
- Design: Segmental arch bridge
- Material: Puddingstone, Roman concrete
- Width: 5.9 m (19 ft)
- Longest span: 17.1 m (56 ft)
- No. of spans: 1

History
- Construction end: Reign of Augustus (30 BC–14 AD)

Location
- Interactive map of Pont de Pierre

The Pont de Pierre (French; Italian: Ponte di pietra), meaning "Stone Bridge", is a Roman bridge in the Italian city of Aosta in the Aosta Valley. The bridge crossed the Buthier about 600 m (2,000 ft) from the eastern exit of the Roman colony Augusta Praetoria; in later times the torrente changed its course, leaving the ancient bridge today without water.

The single-arch bridge has a span of 17.1 m (56 ft) and a width of 5.9 m (19 ft). The arch vault consists of large voussoirs and shows a comparatively flat profile (span to rise ratio 3:1). The facing was built of pudding stone, the spandrels filled with Roman concrete.

The structure is dated to the second half of the reign of Augustus (30 BC–14 AD), who had earlier founded the military colony Augusta Praetoria at an important road junction (24 BC). The Pont de Pierre was of particularly strategic importance, since in Aosta the transalpine routes to Gaul branched off into the Little St Bernard and the Great St Bernard Pass. In a southeasterly direction towards the Po Valley, the road led over another segmental arch bridge, the excellently preserved Pont-Saint-Martin Bridge, located at the exit of the Aosta valley.

== See also ==
- Roman bridge
- List of Roman bridges
- Pont d'Aël

== Sources ==
- O’Connor, Colin (1993), Roman Bridges, Cambridge University Press, pp. 90 (I158), 171, ISBN 0-521-39326-4
