= Atlas Atlantique Airlines =

French regional airline

Atlantique Air Assistance - Atlantic Air Lines - Atlas Atlantique Airlines
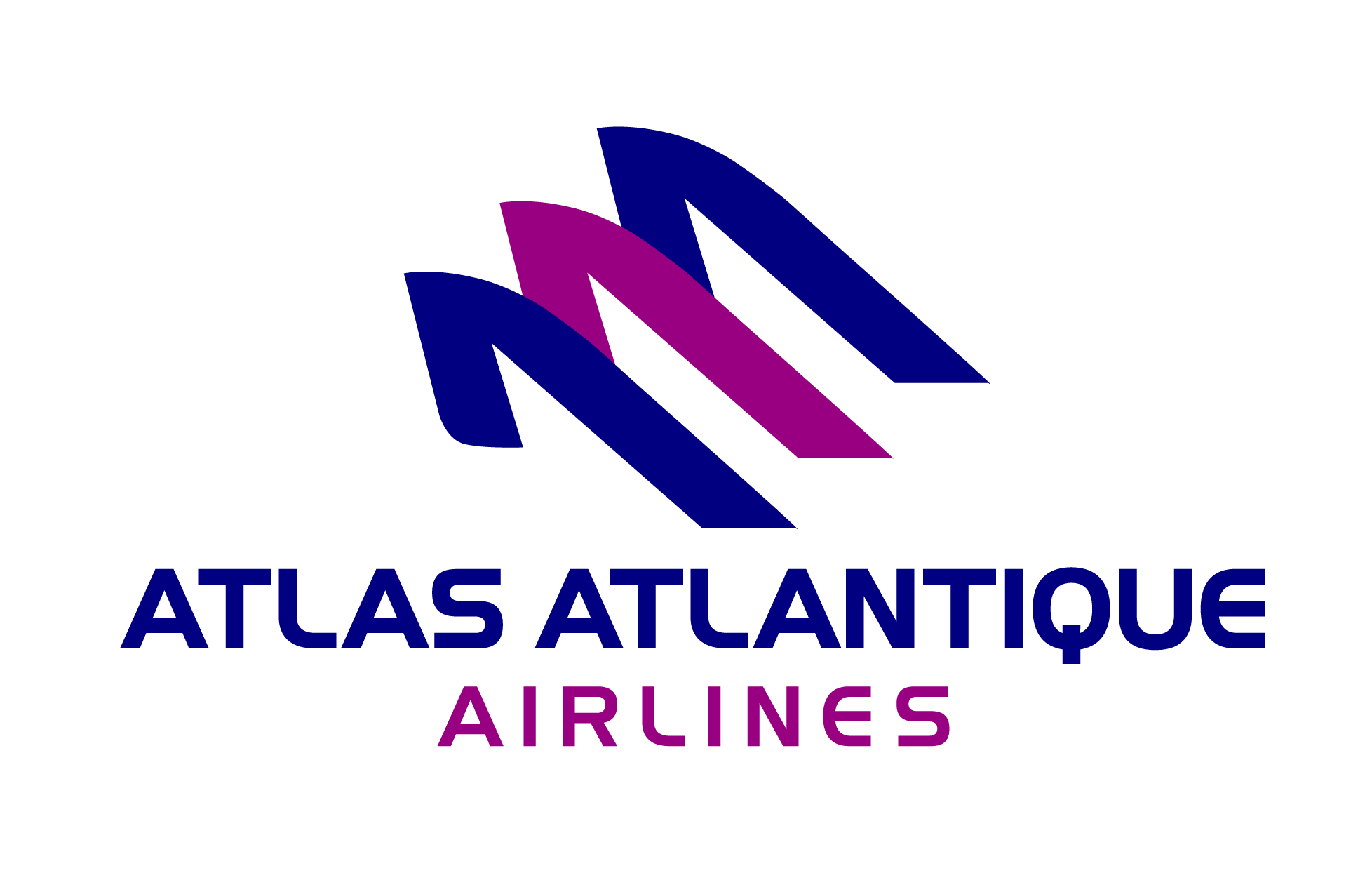

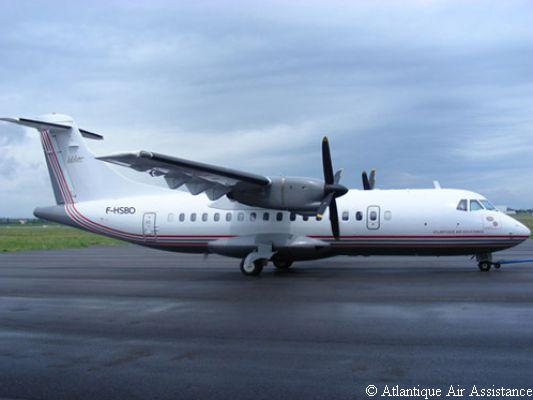
- ATR 42-320
IATA	ICAO	Call sign
L5	TLB	TRIPLE ALPHA
- Founded: 1989
- Ceased operations: October 2017
- Hubs: Nantes Atlantique Airport
- Secondary hubs: Châlons Vatry Airport
- Fleet size: 6
- Destinations: 9
- Headquarters: La Chevrolière, France
- Key people: André Besseau (CEO)
- Website: atlasatlantiqueairlines.com

Atlas Atlantique Airlines, formerly Atlantique Air Assistance, was a French airline headquartered in La Chevrolière. The airline's operating base was at Nantes Atlantique Airport with an office at Paris - Le Bourget Airport.

== History ==
=== 1989-2015 - business and health care transport ===
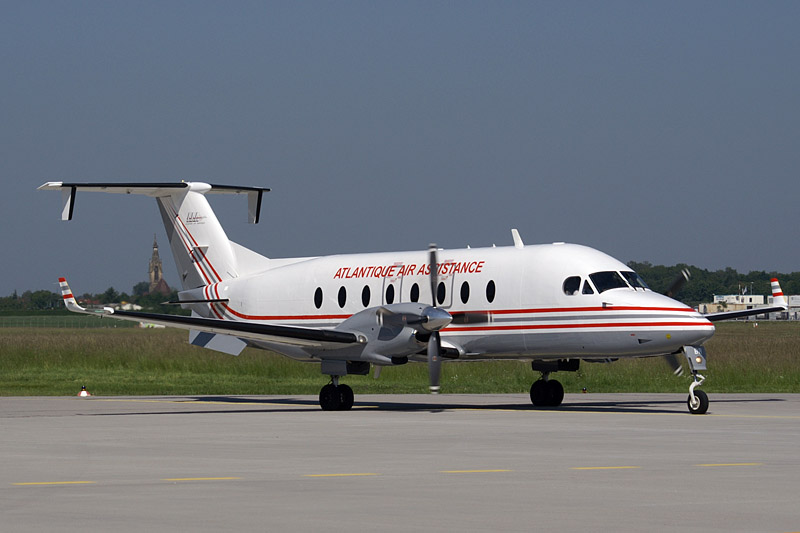
Beechcraft King Air 90

Atlantique Air Assistance was created in 1989 by André Besseau. It offered ad hoc services such as corporate transport, charter flights, air ambulance, non-emergency medical transportation, cargo flights and international funeral transport in France and Europe, mostly on behalf of large French companies. The air carrier had a Global Operating License, as well as an Air Transport certification (CTA N°F-O-002) granted by the French civil aviation authority. The company was also ISO 9001-2000 certified.

By 2008 the fleet had grown to include a pair of Beechcraft 1900s and as many Embraer 120s. In the following years Atlantique Air Assistance became a partner of Atlas Tour, a tour operator based in Lille. In July 2014, the air carrier was acquired by the Lille-based BNA Holding.

=== 2015-2017 - medium-haul airline ===
On December 17, 2015, the company adopted Atlas Atlantique Airlines brand and expanded its operations to include medium-haul flights between France and Algeria. It used a leased Airbus A320-200. In 2017, the company also leased an Airbus A319-100. The growth has been too fast and too reckless and in that same year, the company started experiencing serious financial problems, having difficulty in stabilizing its pattern. The air carrier was placed under court-ordered receivership and ceased operations in October, losing the operating license (AOC) on 13 November. Lacking a buyer, the airline was placed into liquidation on 6 December and will never restart operations.

== Subsidiary ==
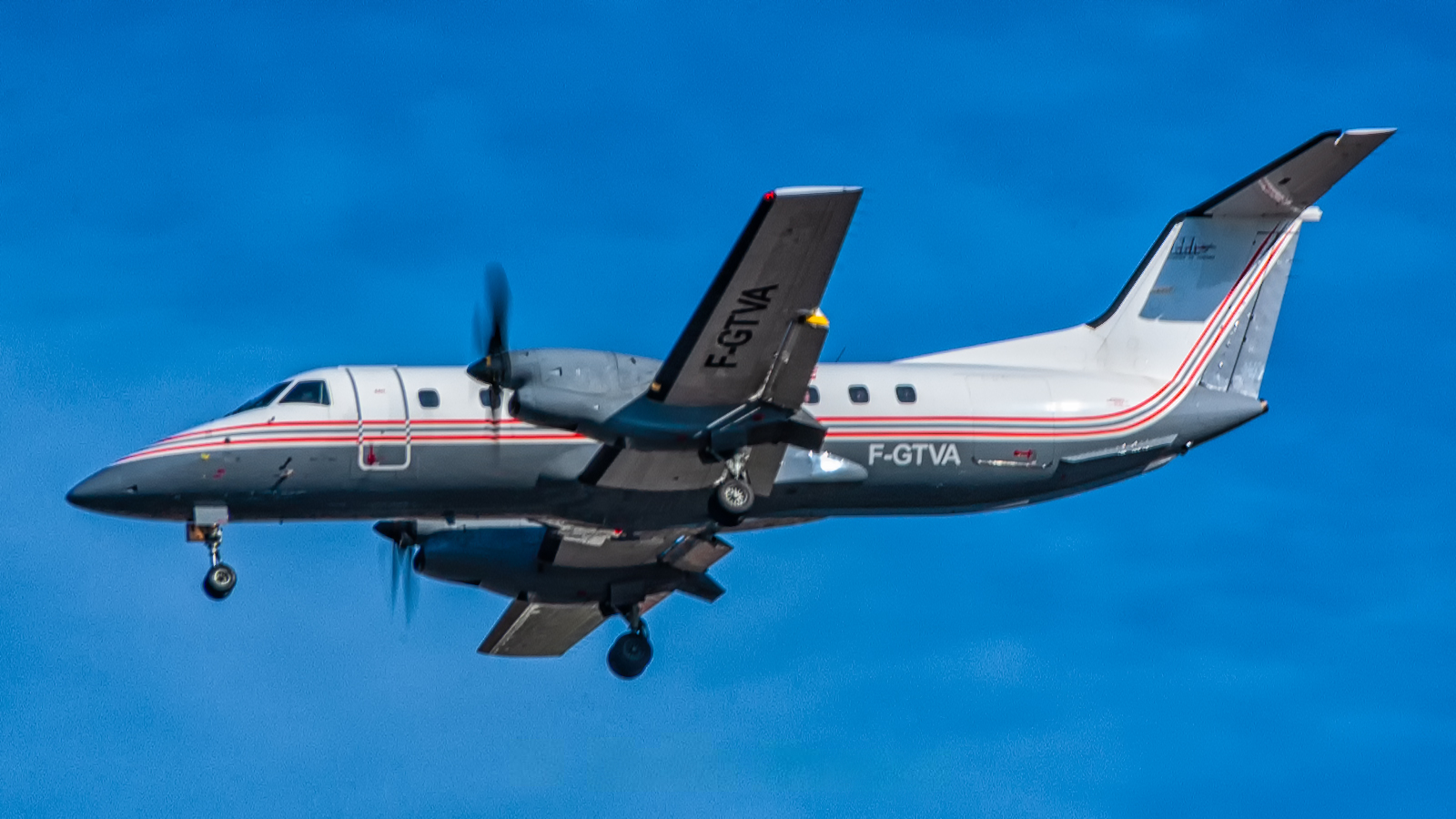
Embraer EMB 120 Brasilia landing at London-Heathrow airport

In 2006, a subsidiary named Atlantic Air Lines was established to operate aircraft with more than 19 seats. Two Embraer EMB 120 Brasilia (30 passengers) were selected. The company was the last French customer to operate the Brazilian turboprop aircraft. In 2008 the air carrier replaced one of them with a larger ATR 42 (46 passengers) which was instrumental for its charter flights between France and Algeria. In December 2015 the company merged into the parent concern.

== Fleet ==
As of January 2015 the Atlas Atlantique Airlines fleet included the following aircraft:

- 1 Airbus A320-200
- 2 ATR 42-320
- 1 Beechcraft King Air 90
- 2 Beechcraft 1900
