= Geneston =

Geneston Jeneston/Jnéton (Gallo) Banaleg-ar-Gevred (Breton)
- Commune
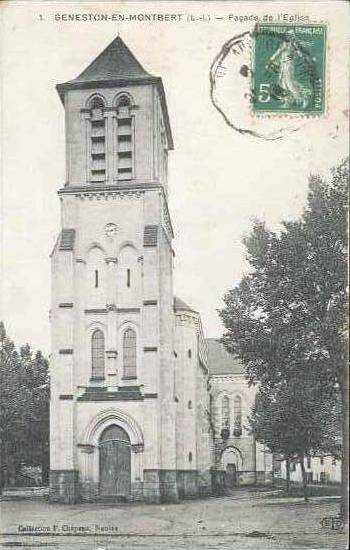

- Coat of arms
- Location of Geneston
- Location within France Location within Pays de la Loire
- Coordinates: 47°03′23″N 1°30′41″W
- Country: France
- Region: Pays de la Loire
- Department: Loire-Atlantique
- Arrondissement: Nantes
- Canton: Saint-Philbert-de-Grand-Lieu
- Intercommunality: Grand Lieu

Government
  - Mayor (2020–2026): Karine Paviza
- Area^{1}: 8.04 km^{2} (3.10 sq mi)
- Highest elevation: 39 m (128 ft)
- Lowest elevation: 14 m (46 ft)
- Population (2023): 3,685
  - Density: 458/km^{2} (1,190/sq mi)
- Time zone: UTC+01:00 (CET)
  - Summer (DST): UTC+02:00 (CEST)
- INSEE/Postal code: 44223 /44140
- ^{1} French Land Register data, which excludes lakes, ponds, glaciers > 1 km^{2} (0.386 sq mi or 247 acres) and river estuaries.

Geneston (French pronunciation: [ʒənɛtɔ̃]; Gallo: Jeneston or Jnéton, Breton: Banaleg-ar-Gevred) is a commune in the Loire-Atlantique department in western France.

== Population ==
The commune was created in 1954 from part of the commune of Montbert.

Historical population

Year	Pop.	±% p.a.
1954	719	—
1962	821	+1.67%
1968	952	+2.50%
1975	1,252	+3.99%
1982	1,595	+3.52%
1990	1,958	+2.60%

Year	Pop.	±% p.a.
1999	2,217	+1.39%
2007	3,380	+5.41%
2012	3,592	+1.22%
2017	3,641	+0.27%
2023	3,685	+0.20%

Source: EHESS and INSEE (1968-2023)

== Twin towns - Sister cities ==
Geneston is twinned with:

- Covelo, Galicia, Spain

== Personalities ==
- Philibert Delorme (1510–1570), architect
- Rogatien Martin (1849–1912), monk in the Marquesas Islands.
- Jean-Baptiste Legeay (1897–1943), active in the Resistance during World War II

== See also ==
- Communes of the Loire-Atlantique department
