= La Limouzinière =

La Limouzinière La Limózinèrr (Gallo) Kerlouevig (Breton)
- Commune
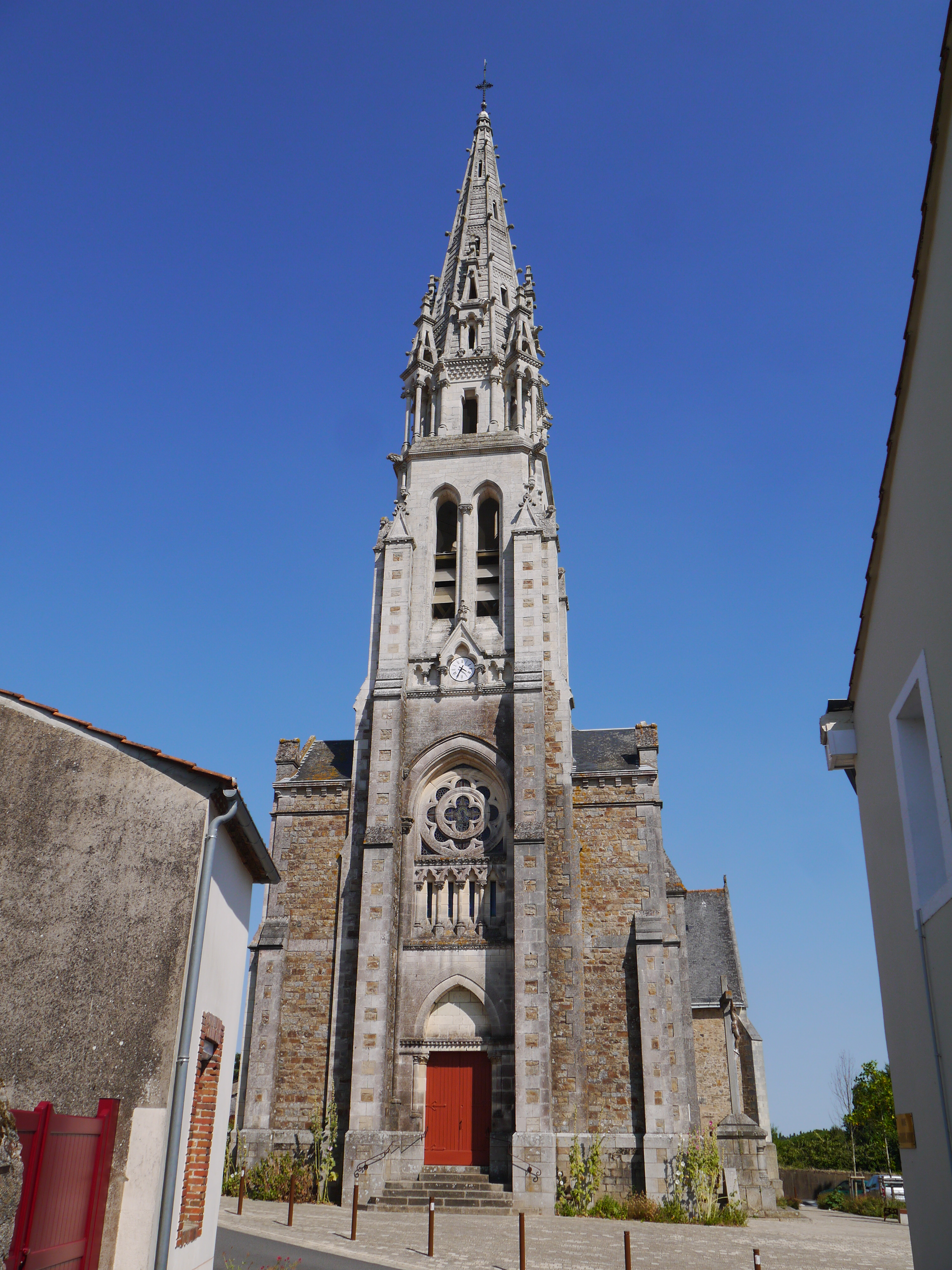

- Coat of arms
- Location of La Limouzinière
- Location within France Location within Pays de la Loire
- Coordinates: 46°59′38″N 1°35′42″W
- Country: France
- Region: Pays de la Loire
- Department: Loire-Atlantique
- Arrondissement: Nantes
- Canton: Saint-Philbert-de-Grand-Lieu
- Intercommunality: Grand Lieu

Government
  - Mayor (2020–2026): Frédéric Launay
- Area^{1}: 29.54 km^{2} (11.41 sq mi)
- Highest elevation: 50 m (160 ft)
- Lowest elevation: 8 m (26 ft)
- Population (2023): 2,459
  - Density: 83.24/km^{2} (215.6/sq mi)
- Time zone: UTC+01:00 (CET)
  - Summer (DST): UTC+02:00 (CEST)
- INSEE/Postal code: 44083 /44310
- ^{1} French Land Register data, which excludes lakes, ponds, glaciers > 1 km^{2} (0.386 sq mi or 247 acres) and river estuaries.

La Limouzinière (French pronunciation: [la limuzinjɛʁ]; Gallo: La Limózinèrr, Breton: Kerlouevig) is a commune in the Loire-Atlantique department in western France.

== Population ==
Historical population

Year	Pop.	±% p.a.
1800	1,116	—
1821	1,205	+0.37%
1846	1,228	+0.08%
1872	1,367	+0.41%
1901	1,573	+0.49%
1926	1,341	−0.64%
1946	1,219	−0.48%
1962	1,227	+0.04%
1968	1,244	+0.23%

Year	Pop.	±% p.a.
1975	1,233	−0.13%
1982	1,147	−1.03%
1990	1,279	+1.37%
1999	1,405	+1.05%
2007	2,049	+4.83%
2012	2,231	+1.72%
2017	2,414	+1.59%
2023	2,459	+0.31%

Source: EHESS and INSEE (1968-2023)

== See also ==
- Communes of the Loire-Atlantique department
