= Le Bignon =

Le Bignon Le Beugnan (Gallo) Ar Bignon (Breton)
- Commune
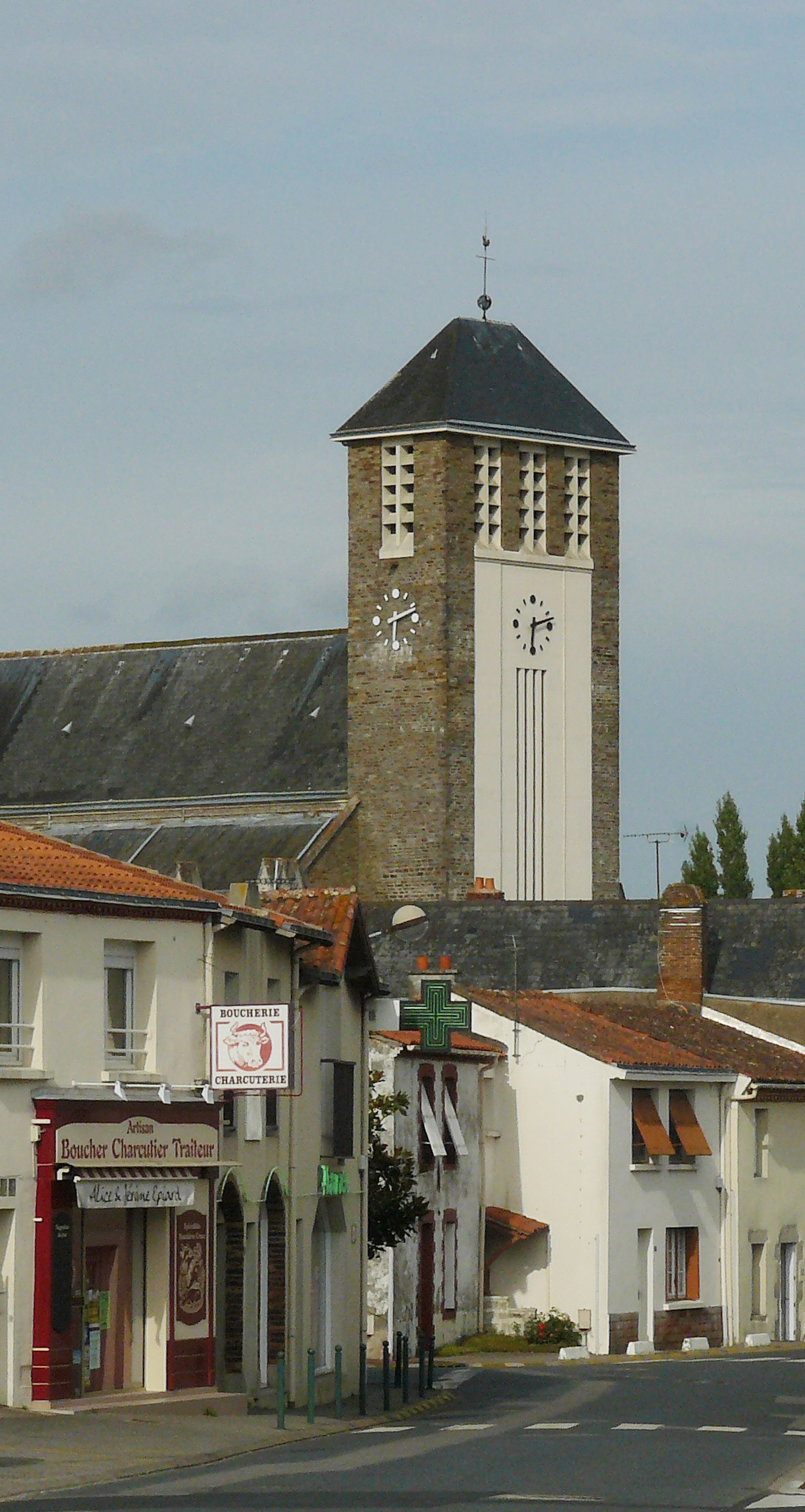

- Coat of arms
- Location of Le Bignon
- Location within France Location within Pays de la Loire
- Coordinates: 47°05′57″N 1°29′22″W
- Country: France
- Region: Pays de la Loire
- Department: Loire-Atlantique
- Arrondissement: Nantes
- Canton: Saint-Philbert-de-Grand-Lieu
- Intercommunality: Grand Lieu

Government
  - Mayor (2024–2026): Loïc Planet
- Area^{1}: 27.54 km^{2} (10.63 sq mi)
- Highest elevation: 58 m (190 ft)
- Lowest elevation: 3 m (9.8 ft)
- Population (2023): 3,976
  - Density: 144.4/km^{2} (373.9/sq mi)
- Time zone: UTC+01:00 (CET)
  - Summer (DST): UTC+02:00 (CEST)
- INSEE/Postal code: 44014 /44140
- ^{1} French Land Register data, which excludes lakes, ponds, glaciers > 1 km^{2} (0.386 sq mi or 247 acres) and river estuaries.

Le Bignon (French pronunciation: [lə biɲɔ̃]; Gallo: Le Beugnan, Breton: Ar Bignon) is a commune in the Loire-Atlantique department in western France.

== Population ==
Historical population

Year	Pop.	±% p.a.
1806	1,643	—
1821	1,833	+0.73%
1846	2,100	+0.55%
1872	1,805	−0.58%
1901	1,763	−0.08%
1926	1,501	−0.64%
1946	1,269	−0.84%
1962	1,438	+0.78%
1968	1,471	+0.38%

Year	Pop.	±% p.a.
1975	1,880	+3.57%
1982	2,279	+2.79%
1990	2,378	+0.53%
1999	2,582	+0.92%
2007	3,184	+2.65%
2012	3,454	+1.64%
2017	3,770	+1.77%
2023	3,976	+0.89%

Source: EHESS and INSEE (1968-2023)

== See also ==
- Communes of the Loire-Atlantique department
