= La Chevrolière =

La Chevrolière La Chevrolèrr (Gallo) Kerc'hevrel (Breton)
- Commune
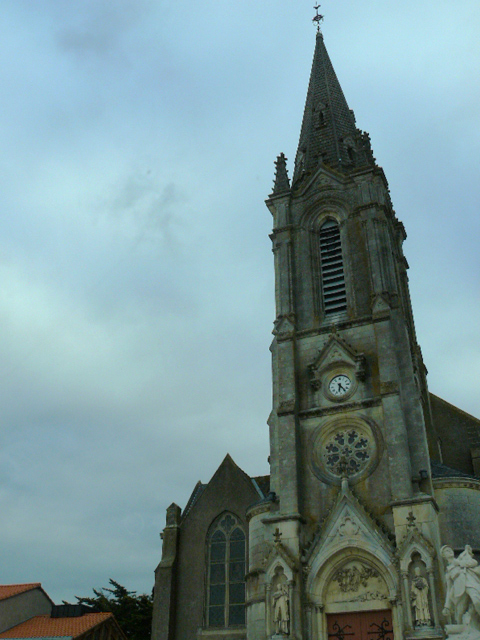
- The church in La Chevrolière

- Coat of arms
- Location of La Chevrolière
- Location within France Location within Pays de la Loire
- Coordinates: 47°05′30″N 1°36′37″W
- Country: France
- Region: Pays de la Loire
- Department: Loire-Atlantique
- Arrondissement: Nantes
- Canton: Saint-Philbert-de-Grand-Lieu
- Intercommunality: Grand Lieu

Government
  - Mayor (2020–2026): Johann Boblin
- Area^{1}: 32.56 km^{2} (12.57 sq mi)
- Highest elevation: 22 m (72 ft)
- Lowest elevation: 0 m (0 ft)
- Population (2023): 6,539
  - Density: 200.8/km^{2} (520.1/sq mi)
- Time zone: UTC+01:00 (CET)
  - Summer (DST): UTC+02:00 (CEST)
- INSEE/Postal code: 44041 /44118
- ^{1} French Land Register data, which excludes lakes, ponds, glaciers > 1 km^{2} (0.386 sq mi or 247 acres) and river estuaries.

La Chevrolière (French pronunciation: [la ʃəvʁɔljɛʁ]; Gallo: La Chevrolèrr, Breton: Kerc'hevrel) is a commune in the Loire-Atlantique department in western France.

== Population ==
Historical population

Year	Pop.	±% p.a.
1800	1,022	—
1806	1,478	+6.34%
1821	1,528	+0.22%
1831	1,655	+0.80%
1841	1,765	+0.65%
1846	1,874	+1.21%
1851	1,937	+0.66%
1856	1,900	−0.38%
1861	1,935	+0.37%
1866	1,937	+0.02%
1872	1,989	+0.44%
1876	2,075	+1.06%
1881	2,131	+0.53%
1886	2,105	−0.25%
1891	2,089	−0.15%
1896	2,073	−0.15%
1901	2,064	−0.09%
1906	2,139	+0.72%

Year	Pop.	±% p.a.
1911	2,078	−0.58%
1921	1,883	−0.98%
1926	1,912	+0.31%
1931	1,830	−0.87%
1936	1,801	−0.32%
1946	1,784	−0.09%
1954	1,849	+0.45%
1962	2,004	+1.01%
1968	2,139	+1.09%
1975	2,444	+1.92%
1982	3,368	+4.69%
1990	4,272	+3.02%
1999	4,851	+1.42%
2007	4,935	+0.21%
2012	5,164	+0.91%
2017	5,589	+1.59%
2023	6,539	+2.65%

Source: EHESS and INSEE (1968-2023)

== International relations ==
La Chevrolière is twinned with Lyndhurst, United Kingdom.

== See also ==
- Communes of the Loire-Atlantique department
