= Saint-Colomban, Loire-Atlantique =

Saint-Colomban
- Commune
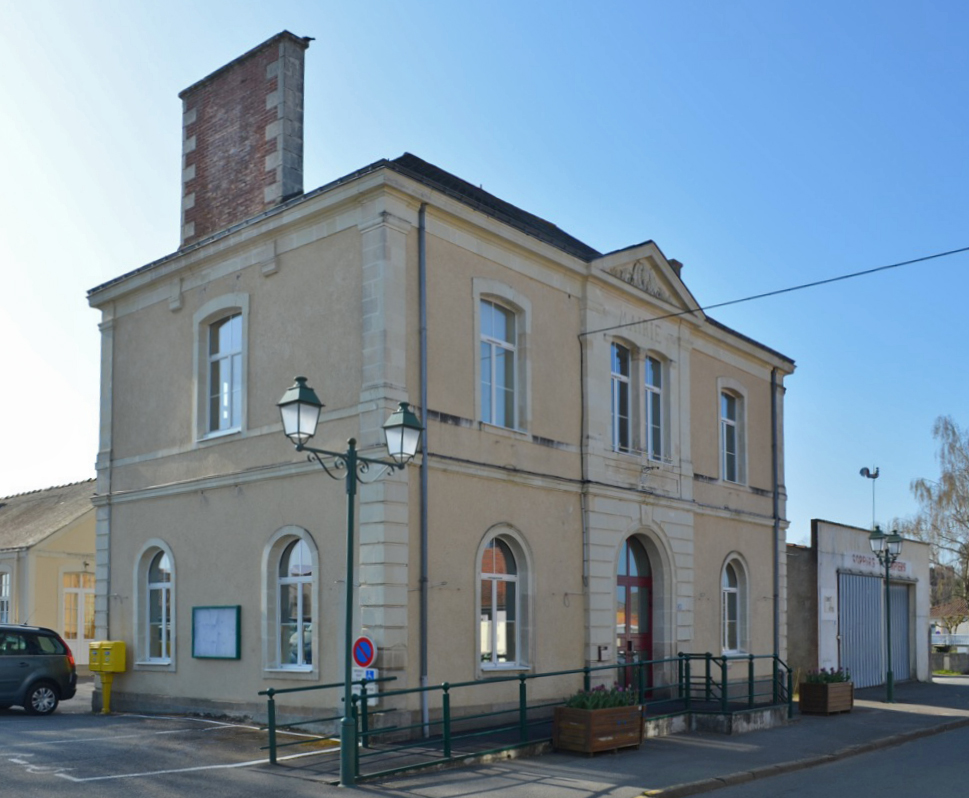
- Town hall

- Coat of arms
- Location of Saint-Colomban
- Location within France Location within Pays de la Loire
- Coordinates: 47°00′35″N 1°34′55″W
- Country: France
- Region: Pays de la Loire
- Department: Loire-Atlantique
- Arrondissement: Nantes
- Canton: Saint-Philbert-de-Grand-Lieu
- Intercommunality: Grand Lieu

Government
  - Mayor (2020–2026): Patrick Bertin
- Area^{1}: 35.72 km^{2} (13.79 sq mi)
- Elevation: 15 m (49 ft)
- Highest elevation: 37 m (121 ft)
- Lowest elevation: 2 m (6.6 ft)
- Population (2023): 3,500
  - Density: 98/km^{2} (250/sq mi)
- Time zone: UTC+01:00 (CET)
  - Summer (DST): UTC+02:00 (CEST)
- INSEE/Postal code: 44155 /44310
- ^{1} French Land Register data, which excludes lakes, ponds, glaciers > 1 km^{2} (0.386 sq mi or 247 acres) and river estuaries.

Saint-Colomban (French pronunciation: [sɛ̃ kɔlɔ̃bɑ̃]; Breton: Sant-Koulman) is a commune in the Loire-Atlantique department in western France.

== Population ==
Historical population

Year	Pop.	±% p.a.
1800	1,320	—
1821	1,965	+1.91%
1846	2,026	+0.12%
1872	2,327	+0.53%
1901	2,203	−0.19%
1926	1,747	−0.92%
1946	1,580	−0.50%
1962	1,642	+0.24%
1968	1,657	+0.15%

Year	Pop.	±% p.a.
1975	1,625	−0.28%
1982	1,817	+1.61%
1990	1,889	+0.49%
1999	2,027	+0.79%
2007	2,872	+4.45%
2012	3,191	+2.13%
2017	3,355	+1.01%
2023	3,500	+0.71%

Source: EHESS and INSEE (1968-2023)

== See also ==
- Communes of the Loire-Atlantique department
