= Buthier =

River in the Aosta Valley, Italy

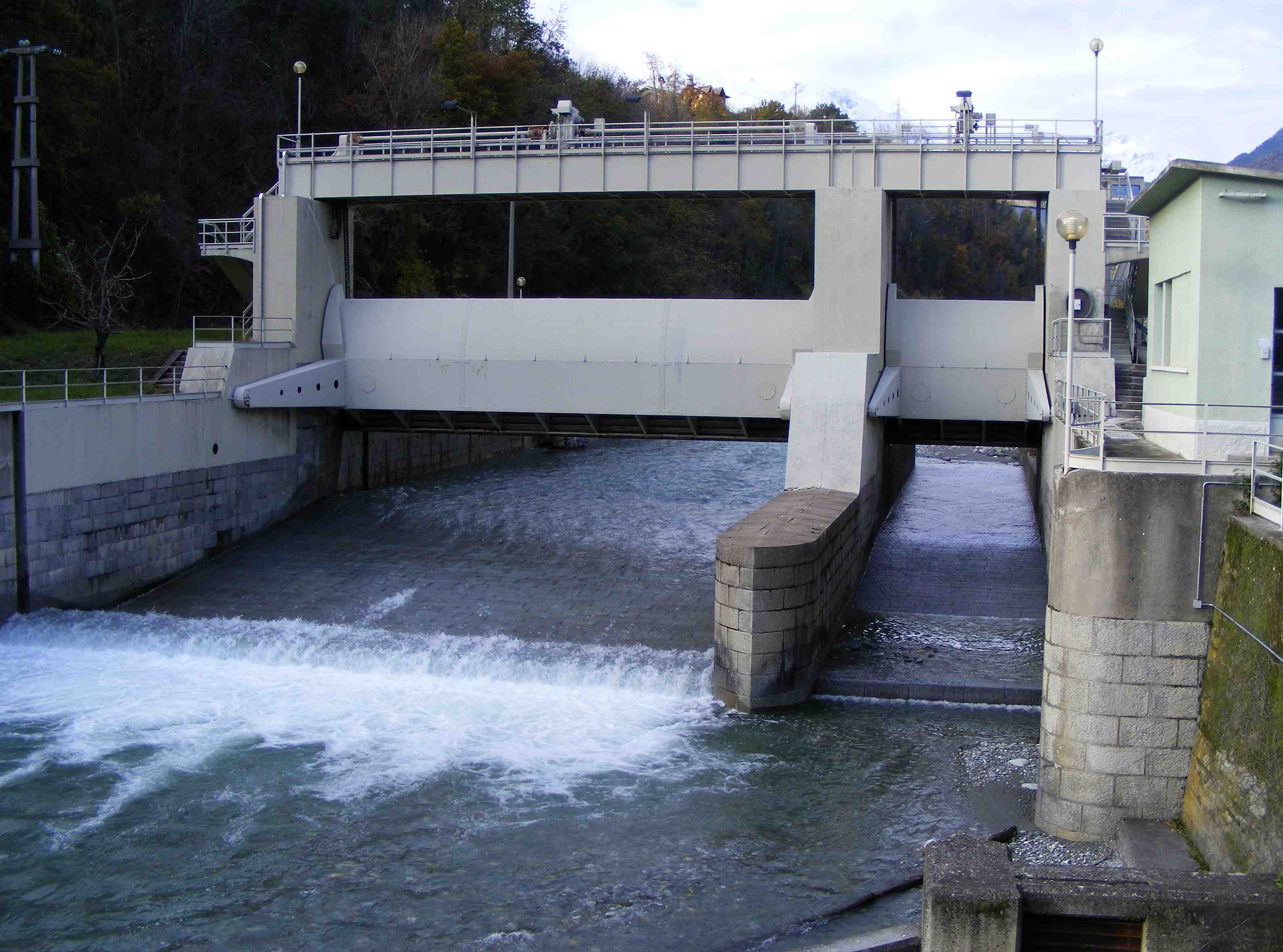
- Saumont dam, near Aosta

Location
- Country: Italy

Physical characteristics
- Source
  - location: Grandes Murailles glacier
  - elevation: 3,000 m (9,800 ft)
- Mouth
  - location: Dora Baltea in Aosta
  - coordinates: 45.7321°N 7.3403°E
- Length: 40 km (25 mi)

Basin features
- Progression: Dora Baltea

The Buthier (French: [bytje]) is a mountain torrent in north-west Italy. A left bank tributary of the Dora Baltea, its entire course lies within the Valpelline, a valley in the region of Aosta Valley.

== Course ==
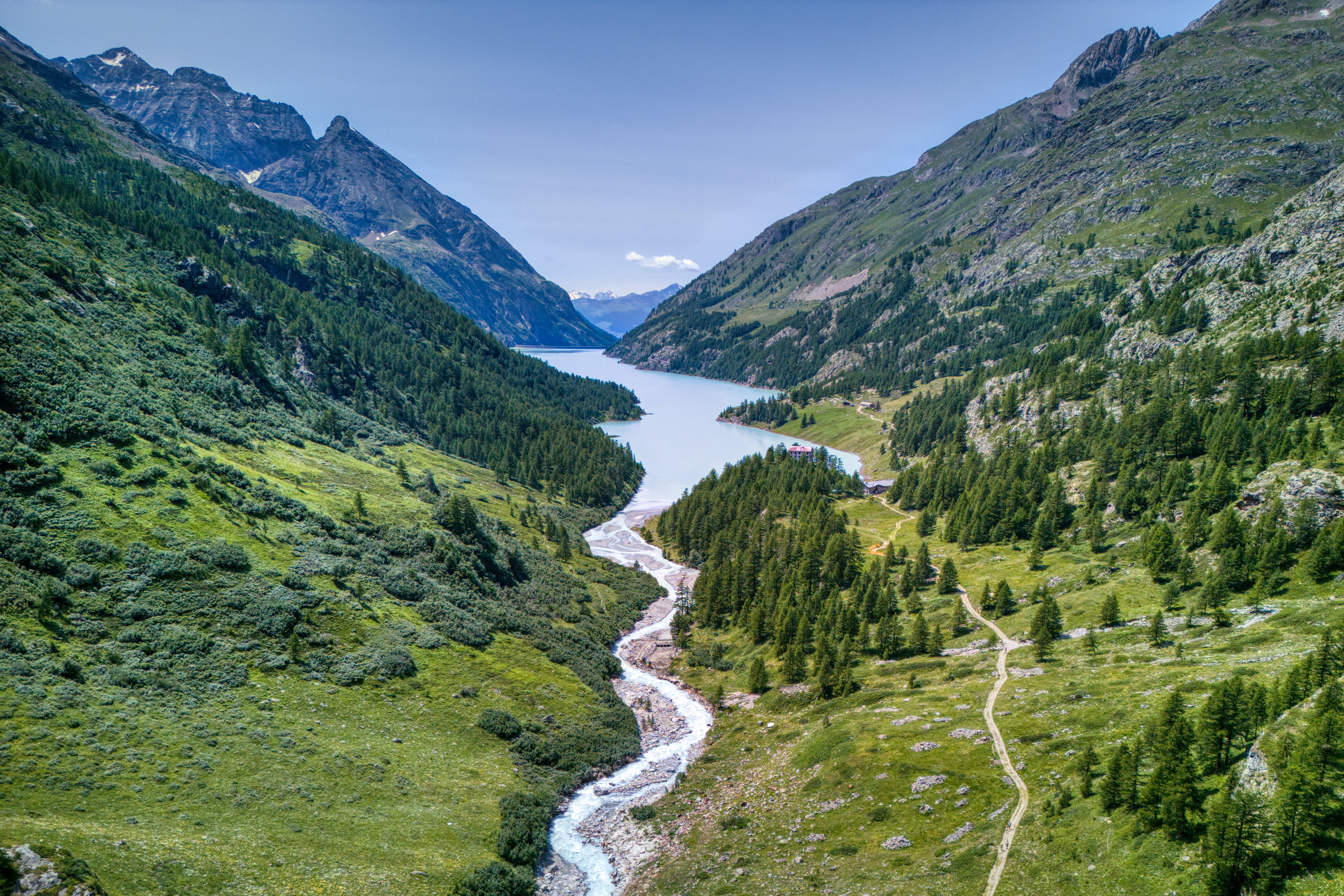
The Buthier flows into the Place-Moulin Lake

One branch of the river is formed by the Tsa de Tsan Glacier at an elevation of about 2,700 metres (8,900 ft); a second by the Grandes Murailles glacier at about 3,000 metres (9,800 ft). The river is then dammed to form the Place-Moulin Lake reservoir, after which it passes through the communes of Bionaz, Oyace, Valpelline, Roisan and finally Aosta where it joins the Dora Baltea.

== Tributaries ==
The principal tributaries from the left are:

- Rû Verdonaz
- Vessonaz;

and from the right:

- Ollomont
- Artanavaz.

== Bridges ==
- Pont de Pierre, a Roman bridge from the time of Augustus (r. 30 BC –14 AD)

== Notes ==
This article began as a translation from its counterpart in the Italian Wikipedia, specifically from this version
