= Pont-Saint-Martin, Aosta Valley =

Pont-Saint-Martin Pón-Sèn-Marteun (Valdôtain) Martinstäg (Walser) Pont San Martìn (Piedmontese)
- Comune
- Comune di Pont-Saint-Martin; Commune de Pont-Saint-Martin
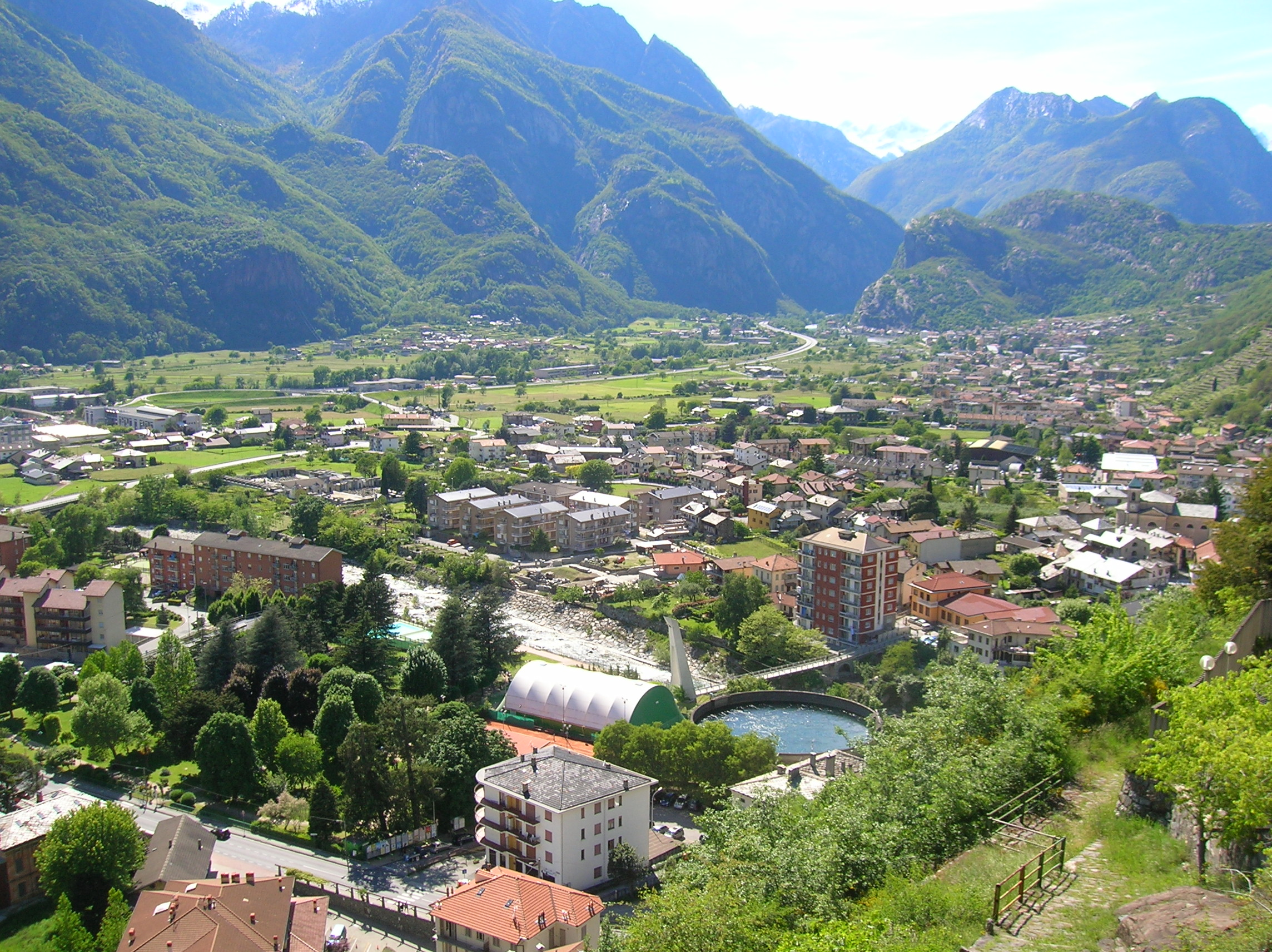
- View of Pont-Saint-Martin from Ivéry.

- Coat of arms

- Location within Italy Location within Aosta Valley
- Coordinates: 45°36′N 7°48′E
- Country: Italy
- Region: Aosta Valley

Government
  - Mayor: Marco Sucquet

Area
  - Total: 6.92 km^{2} (2.67 sq mi)
- Elevation: 350 m (1,150 ft)

Population (31 December 2022)
  - Total: 3,527
  - Density: 510/km^{2} (1,320/sq mi)
- Demonym(s): Ponsammartinesi (Italian); Saint-martinois (French)
- Time zone: UTC+1 (CET)
  - Summer (DST): UTC+2 (CEST)
- Postal code: 11026
- Dialing code: 0125
- Website: Official website

Pont-Saint-Martin (French: [pɔ̃ sɛ̃ maʁtɛ̃]; Valdôtain: Pón-Sèn-Marteun or Pón-Sén-Martìn; Walser: Martinstäg or Steg; Piedmontese: Pont San Martìn) is a town and comune in the Aosta Valley region of northwest Italy.

== Landmarks ==
- Pont-Saint-Martin Bridge
- Castle of Pont-Saint-Martin
- Castle of Suzey

== Hamlets ==
Baraing, Bois-Derrière, Les Bosc, Bosquet, Champ-de-Las, Chapret, La Charmaz, Chavanne, Chuchal, Clapey, Colombéraz, Concaby, Corney, Extillian-Dessous, Extillian-Dessus, Fabioles, Fontaney, La Grangiaz, Ivéry, Liscoz, Le Magnin, Mounot, Oley, Perruchon, Le Pian, Pian-de-la-Barmaz, Pian-des-Boses, Pian-du-Gias, Le Pianet, Pian-Gregnit, Prati-Novi, Praz-Seigneur, Ronc-de-Grangiaz, Les Roncs, Rondias-Dessous, Rondias-Dessus, Saint-Roch, Serrapianaz, Susey, Les Thuets, Tiombé, Torgnon, La Valeille, Vietti, Vignolet.

== Twin towns ==
- Pont-Saint-Martin, France
- Bétera, Spain
