= Aymavilles =

Aymavilles Lé-z-Amaveulle (Valdôtain)
- Comune
- Comune di Aymavilles; Commune d'Aymavilles
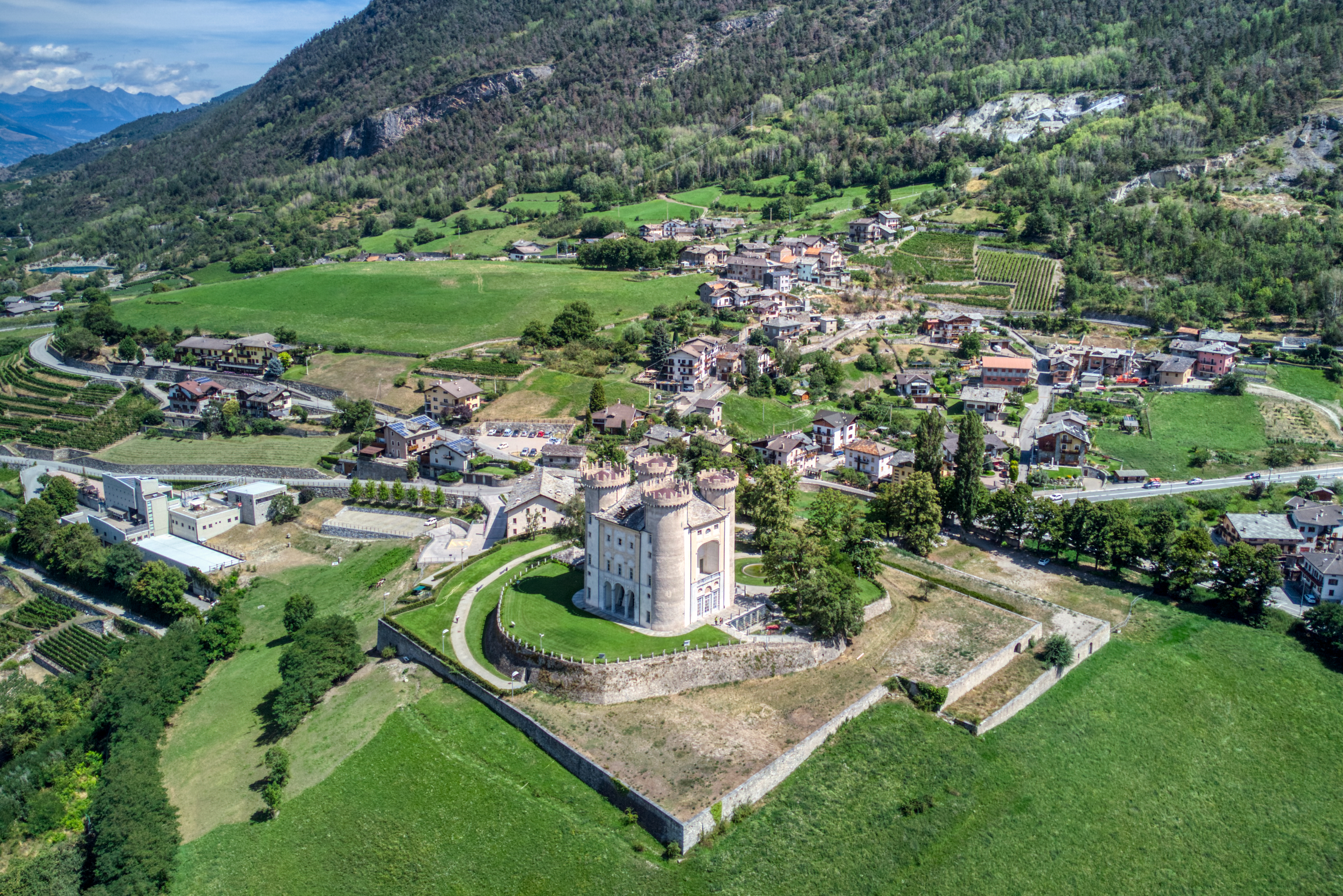

- Coat of arms

- Location within Italy Location within Aosta Valley
- Coordinates: 45°42′4.32″N 7°14′25.08″E
- Country: Italy
- Region: Aosta Valley
- Province: none
- Frazioni: Le Bettex, La Camagne, Caouz, Chef-lieu, Cerignan, Le Chabloz, Champagnole, Champessolin, Champlan, Champleval-Dessous, Le Château, Cheriettes, Chevril, Clos-Savin, La Cleyvaz, La Combaz-de-la-Donnaz, Crétaz-Saint-Martin, Le Croux, Le Dialley, La Ferrière, Le Folliex, Le Fournier, Gallièse, Le Géraudey, Le Glassier, Les Léonard, Lillaz, Le Micheley, Le Montbel, Les Moulins, Orsière, Ozein (Le Belley, Le Chantel, Le Dailley, La Charrère, Les Murasses, Pos, Vers-les-Prés, La Ville), Pesse, Pognon Pompiod, Le Pont-d'Aël, La Poyaz, La Roche, Saint-Léger, Saint-Maurice, Seissogne, Sylvenoire, Tour-d'Allian (Villetos), Turlin (Chanabertaz, Turlin-Dessous, Turlin-Dessus), Les Urbains, Venoir, Vercellod, Vieyes

Area
  - Total: 53 km^{2} (20 sq mi)
- Elevation: 640 m (2,100 ft)

Population (31 December 2022)
  - Total: 2,096
  - Density: 40/km^{2} (100/sq mi)
- Demonym: Aymavillains
- Time zone: UTC+1 (CET)
  - Summer (DST): UTC+2 (CEST)
- Postal code: 11010
- Dialing code: 0165
- Patron saint: Christ the King
- Saint day: Advent
- Website: Official website

Aymavilles (French: [ɛmavil]; Valdôtain: Lé-z-Amaveulle) is a town and comune in the Aosta Valley region of northwestern Italy.

The Roman aqueduct bridge Pont d'Aël, in the village of the same name, crosses a 66-metre (217 ft) deep gorge, today carrying a hiking trail.

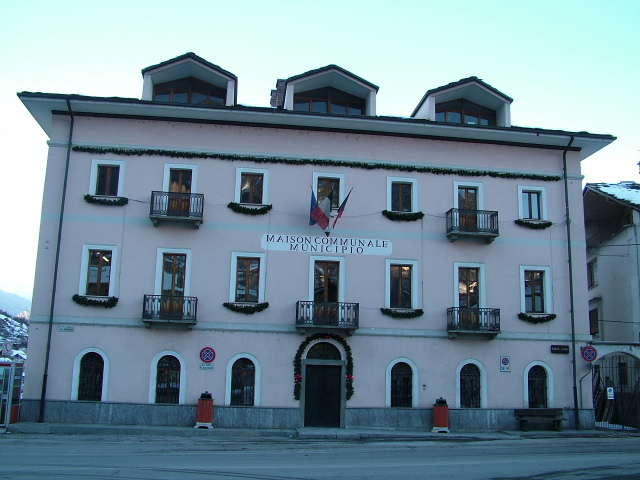
The Town Hall.
