= Pont-Saint-Martin, Loire-Atlantique =

Pont-Saint-Martin
- Commune
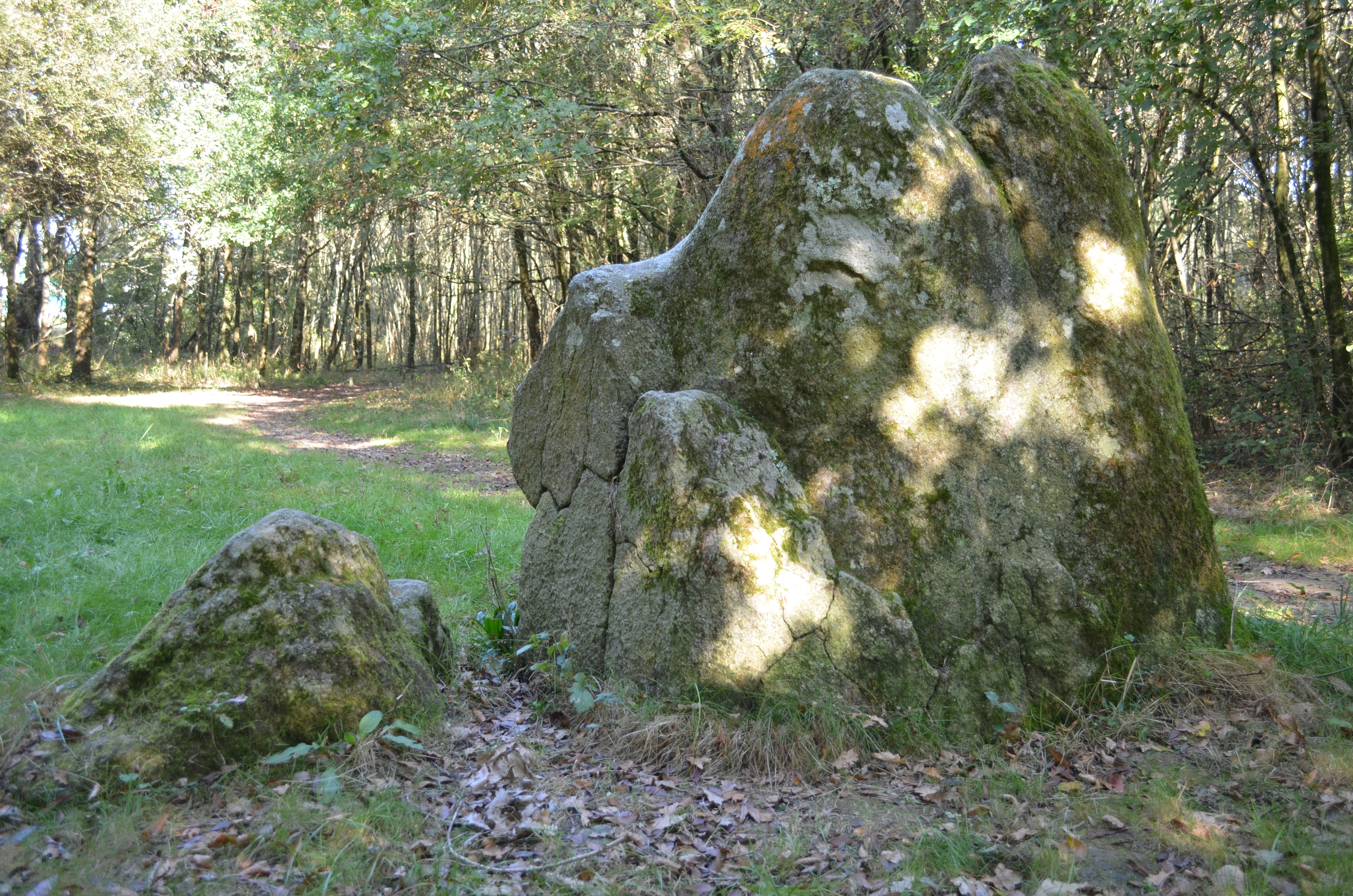
- Menhir of Dames de Pierre

- Coat of arms
- Location of Pont-Saint-Martin
- Location within France Location within Pays de la Loire
- Coordinates: 47°07′00″N 1°35′00″W
- Country: France
- Region: Pays de la Loire
- Department: Loire-Atlantique
- Arrondissement: Nantes
- Canton: Saint-Philbert-de-Grand-Lieu
- Intercommunality: Grand Lieu

Government
  - Mayor (2020–2026): Yannick Fétiveau
- Area^{1}: 21.88 km^{2} (8.45 sq mi)
- Highest elevation: 31 m (102 ft)
- Lowest elevation: 0 m (0 ft)
- Population (2023): 7,093
  - Density: 324.2/km^{2} (839.6/sq mi)
- Time zone: UTC+01:00 (CET)
  - Summer (DST): UTC+02:00 (CEST)
- INSEE/Postal code: 44130 /44860
- ^{1} French Land Register data, which excludes lakes, ponds, glaciers > 1 km^{2} (0.386 sq mi or 247 acres) and river estuaries.

Pont-Saint-Martin (French pronunciation: [pɔ̃ sɛ̃ maʁtɛ̃]; Breton: Pont-Marzhin) is a commune in the Loire-Atlantique department in western France.

== Etymology ==
Legend has it that Saint Martin built a bridge over the river Ognon on the territory of the commune.

== History ==
The parish was established in the sixth century by Saint Martin, who was charged with preaching in the region by the bishop of Nantes. It is first mentioned in a bull of Pope Alexander III in 1179. Under the supervision of the monastery of Villenuve and convent of Couëts, 250 hectares were planted in vineyards.

During the Vendéan Wars (1793-1794), the commune lost 18 percent of its population.

== Population ==
Historical population

Year	Pop.	±% p.a.
1793	1,698	—
1800	982	−7.52%
1806	1,281	+4.53%
1821	395	−7.54%
1831	1,478	+14.11%
1841	1,604	+0.82%
1846	1,780	+2.10%
1851	1,955	+1.89%
1856	1,906	−0.51%
1861	1,851	−0.58%
1866	1,648	−2.30%
1872	1,679	+0.31%
1876	1,717	+0.56%
1881	1,723	+0.07%
1886	1,734	+0.13%
1891	1,694	−0.47%
1896	1,641	−0.63%
1901	1,635	−0.07%

Year	Pop.	±% p.a.
1906	1,602	−0.41%
1911	1,543	−0.75%
1921	1,429	−0.76%
1926	1,515	+1.18%
1931	1,471	−0.59%
1936	1,425	−0.63%
1946	1,516	+0.62%
1954	1,713	+1.54%
1962	1,932	+1.52%
1968	2,134	+1.67%
1975	2,690	+3.36%
1982	3,320	+3.05%
1990	3,835	+1.82%
1999	4,754	+2.42%
2007	5,454	+1.73%
2012	5,658	+0.74%
2017	6,037	+1.31%
2023	7,093	+2.72%

Source: EHESS and INSEE (1968-2023)

== Twin towns ==
It is twinned with the Hampshire village of Brockenhurst in England.

== See also ==
- Communes of the Loire-Atlantique department
