= Pont Saint-Martin =

Bridge in Italy, built by Romans

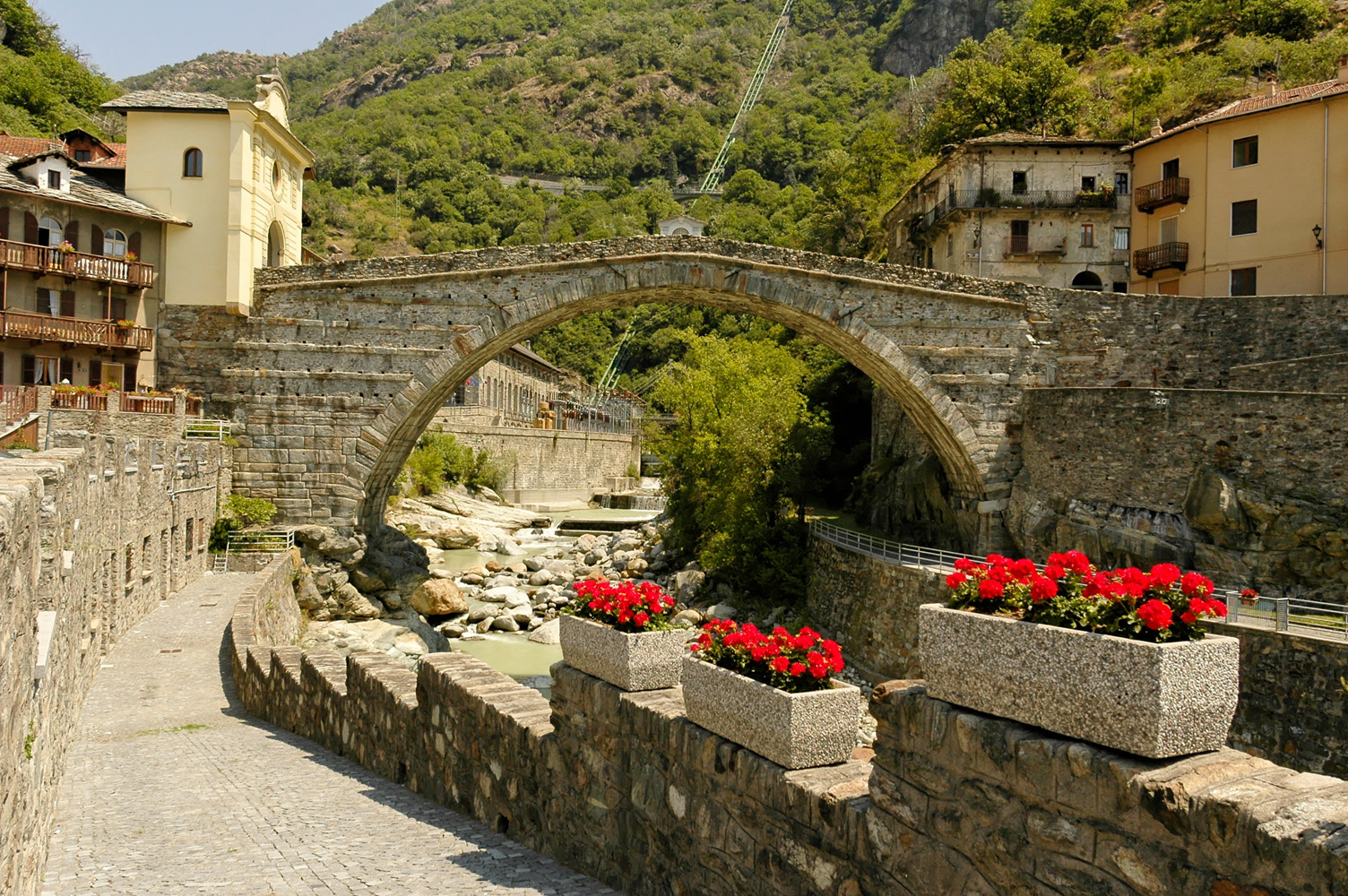
- The Pont Saint-Martin
- Coordinates: 45°35′58″N 7°48′00″E
- Carries: Connection Po Valley-Gaul
- Crosses: Lys
- Locale: Pont-Saint-Martin, Aosta Valley, Italy

Characteristics
- Design: Arch bridge
- Material: Stone
- Width: 5.8 m
- Longest span: 31.4 m, 35.64 m or 36.65 m
- No. of spans: 1

History
- Construction end: Reign of Augustus (27 BC–14 AD)

Location
- Interactive map of Pont Saint-Martin

The Pont Saint-Martin is a Roman bridge in the Aosta Valley in Italy dating to the 1st century BC.

The span is 31.4 metres (103 ft) according to recent research, but frequently stated to be 35.64 m or 36.65 m.

Other extant Roman bridges in the Aosta valley include the Pont d'Aël in the Cogne Valley and the Pont de Pierre in Aosta.

== See also ==
- List of Roman bridges
- Roman architecture
- Roman engineering

== Sources ==
- O’Connor, Colin (1993). Roman Bridges. Cambridge University Press. pp. 89f. (I155). ISBN 0-521-39326-4.
