= Segmental arch =

Type of arch with a circular arc of less than 180 degrees

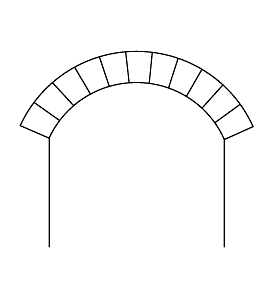
A segmental arch.

A segmental arch is a type of arch with a circular arc of less than 180 degrees. It is sometimes also called a scheme arch.

The segmental arch is one of the strongest arches because it is able to resist thrust. To prevent failure, a segmental arch must have a rise that is equal to at least one-eighth the width of the span. Segmental arches with a rise that is less than one-eighth of the span width must have a permanent support or frame beneath the arch to prevent failure.

The segmental arch is very old (the versions were cut in the rock in Ancient Egypt c. 2100 BC at Beni Hasan). Since then it was occasionally used in Greek temples, utilized in Roman residential construction, Islamic architecture, and got popular as window pediments during the Renaissance. The closed-spandrel Pont-Saint-Martin bridge in the Aosta Valley in Italy dates to 25 BC. The first open-spandrel segmental arch bridge is the Anji Bridge over the Xiao River in Hebei Province in China, which was built in 610 AD.

Segmental arches were most commonly used in the 12th-14th centuries, later practically replaced by the low four-centred arch. Some use continued, in the 20th century mostly in residential construction over doorways, fireplaces, and windows.

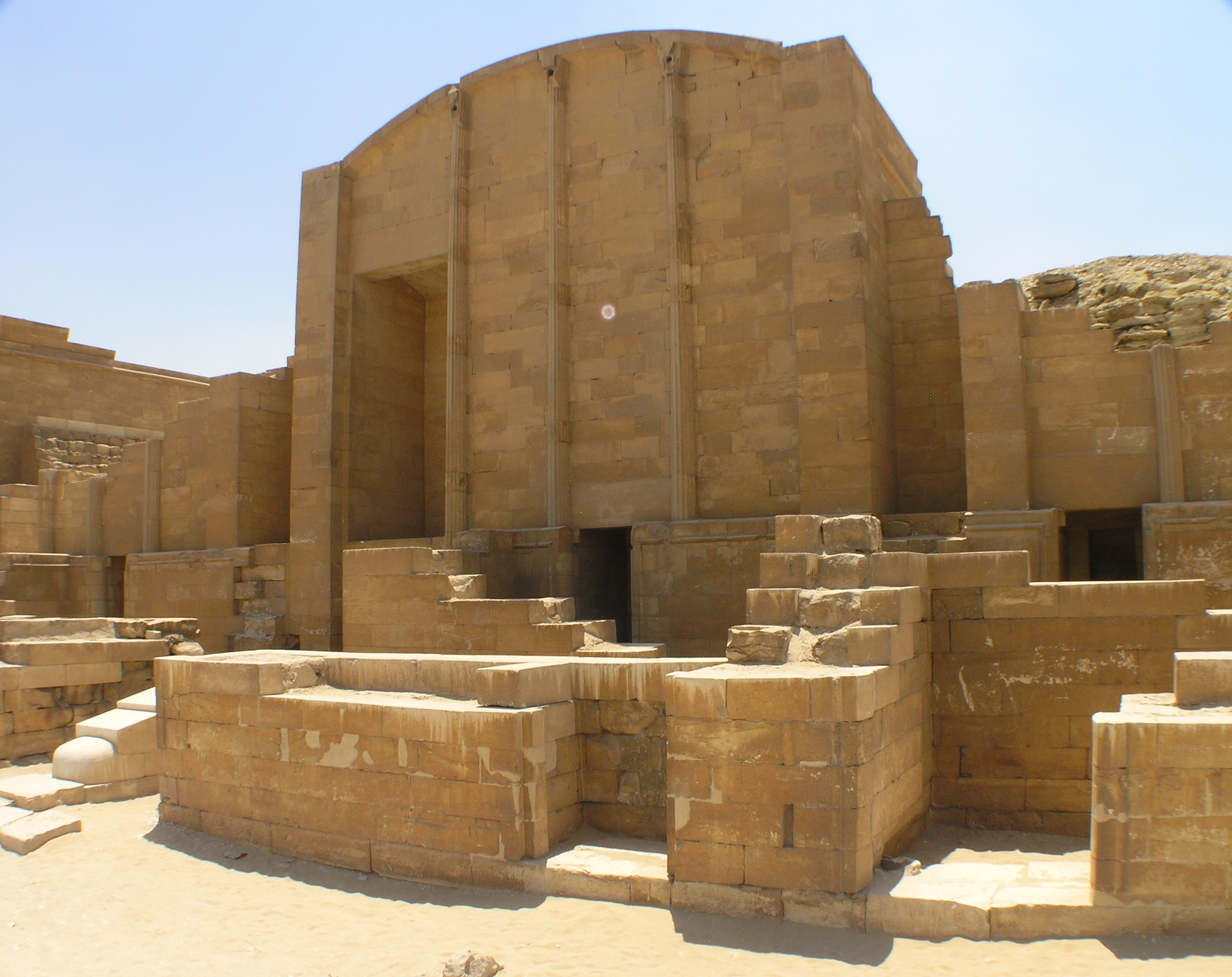
Vaulted building using a decorative segmented arch at the Heb-sed court in Saqqara (restored, c. 2650 BC)

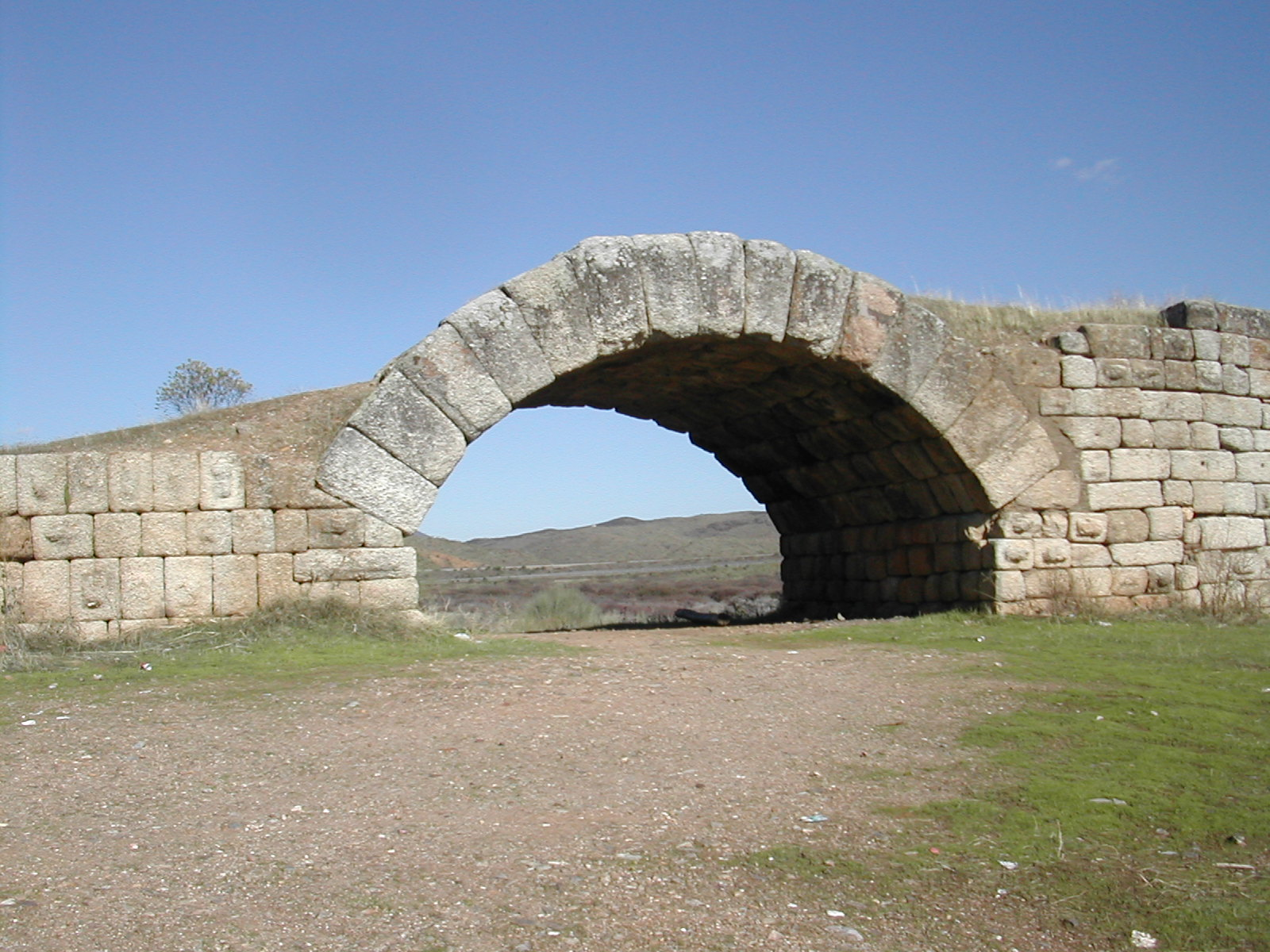
Segmental arch of the Alconétar Bridge (1st-2nd century AD)

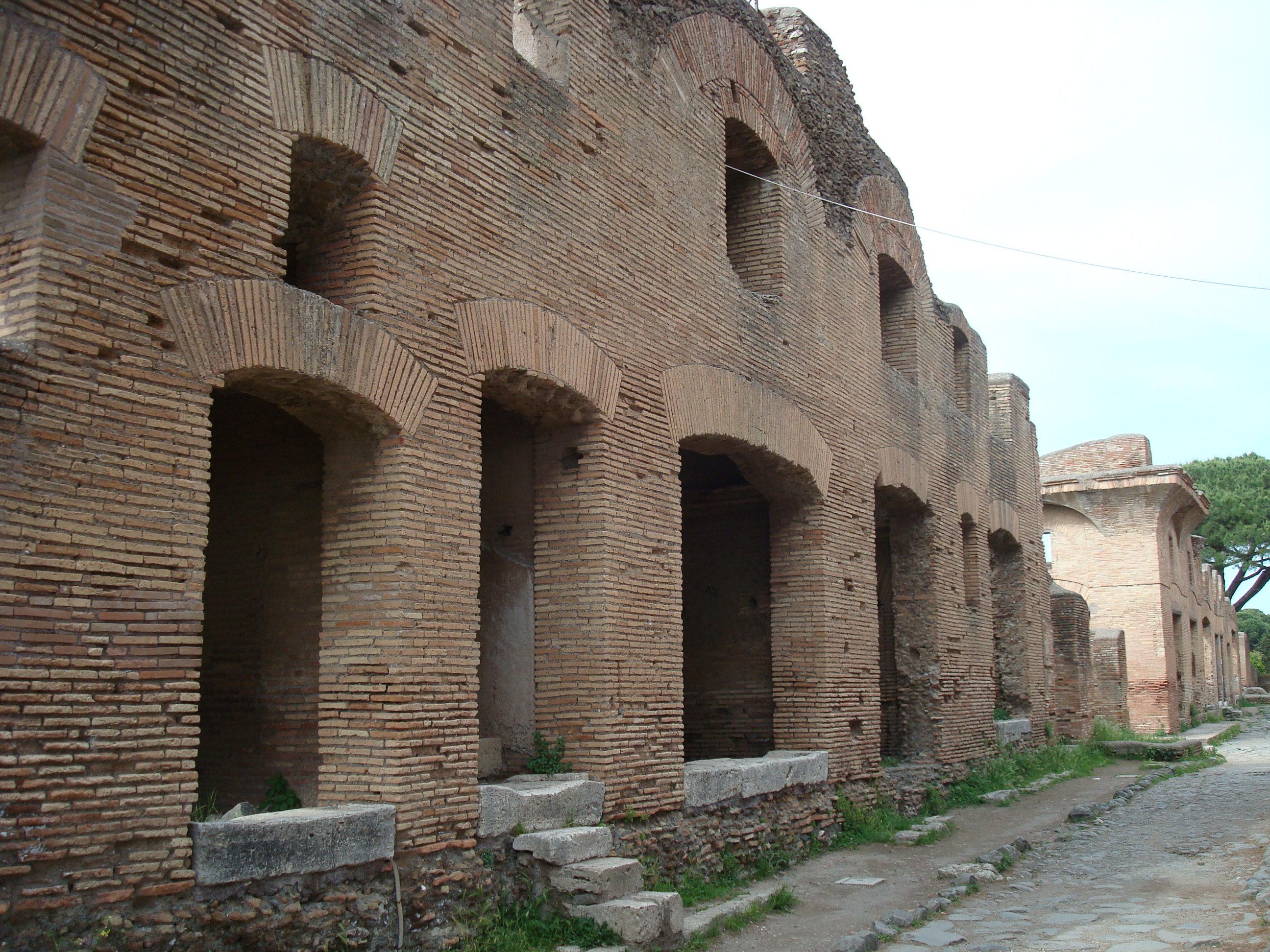
Segmental arches in an Ostian insula

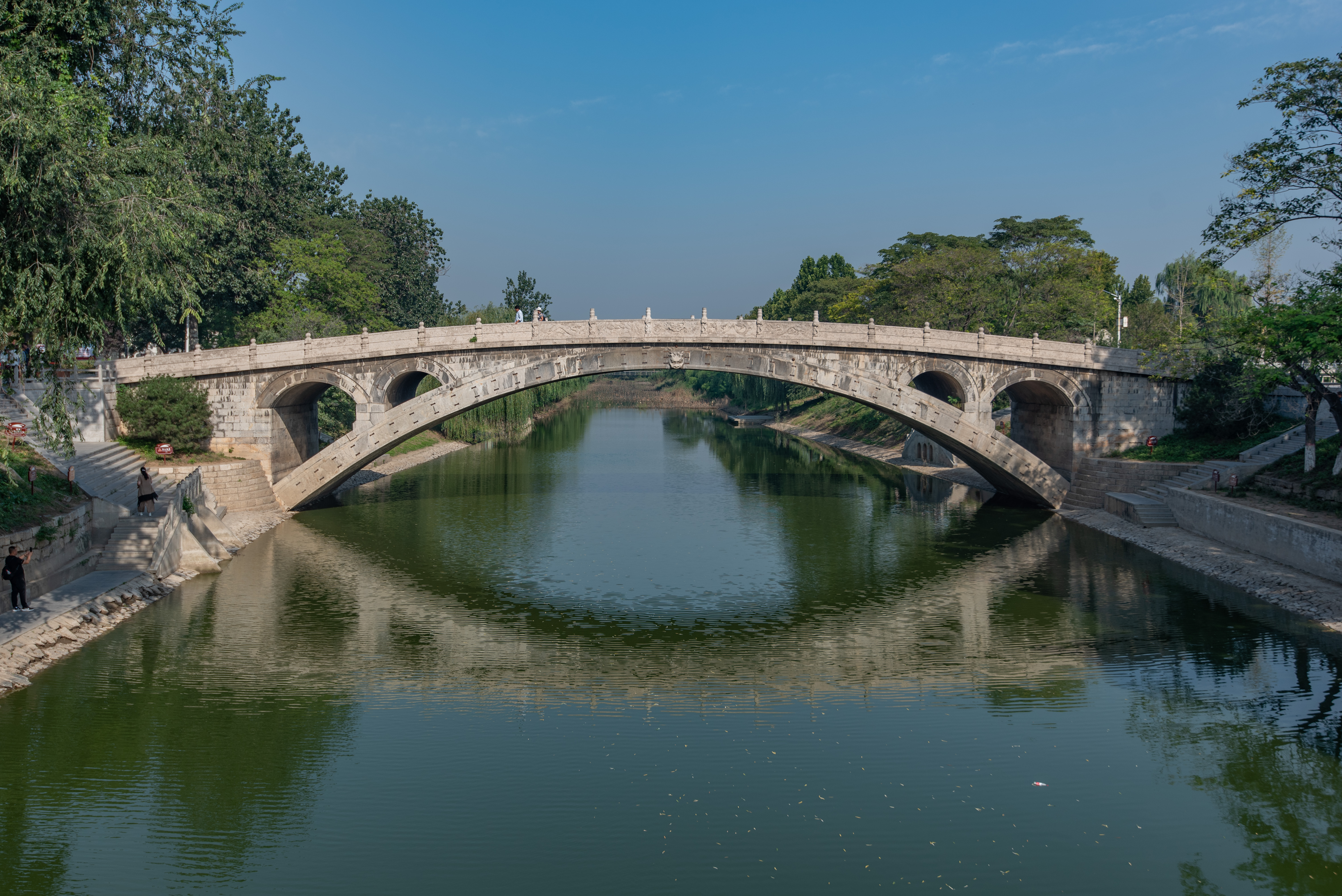
Anji Bridge

== Sources ==
- Audsley, W.; Audsley, G.A. (1881). "Arch". Popular Dictionary of Architecture and the Allied Arts: A Work of Reference for the Architect, Builder, Sculptor, Decorative Artist, and General Student. With Numerous Illustrations from All Styles of Architecture, from the Egyptian to the Renaissance. Popular Dictionary of Architecture and the Allied Arts: A Work of Reference for the Architect, Builder, Sculptor, Decorative Artist, and General Student. G. P. Putnam's sons. pp. 24–39.
- DeLaine, Janet (1990). "Structural experimentation: The lintel arch, corbel and tie in western Roman architecture". World Archaeology. 21 (3): 407–424. doi:10.1080/00438243.1990.9980116. ISSN 0043-8243. JSTOR 124838.
- Woodman, Francis; Bloom, Jonathan M. (2003). "Arch". Oxford Art Online. Oxford University Press. doi:10.1093/gao/9781884446054.article.t003657. ISBN 978-1-884446-05-4.
