= Hôtel de Ville, Vertou =

Town hall in Vertou, France

Hôtel de Ville
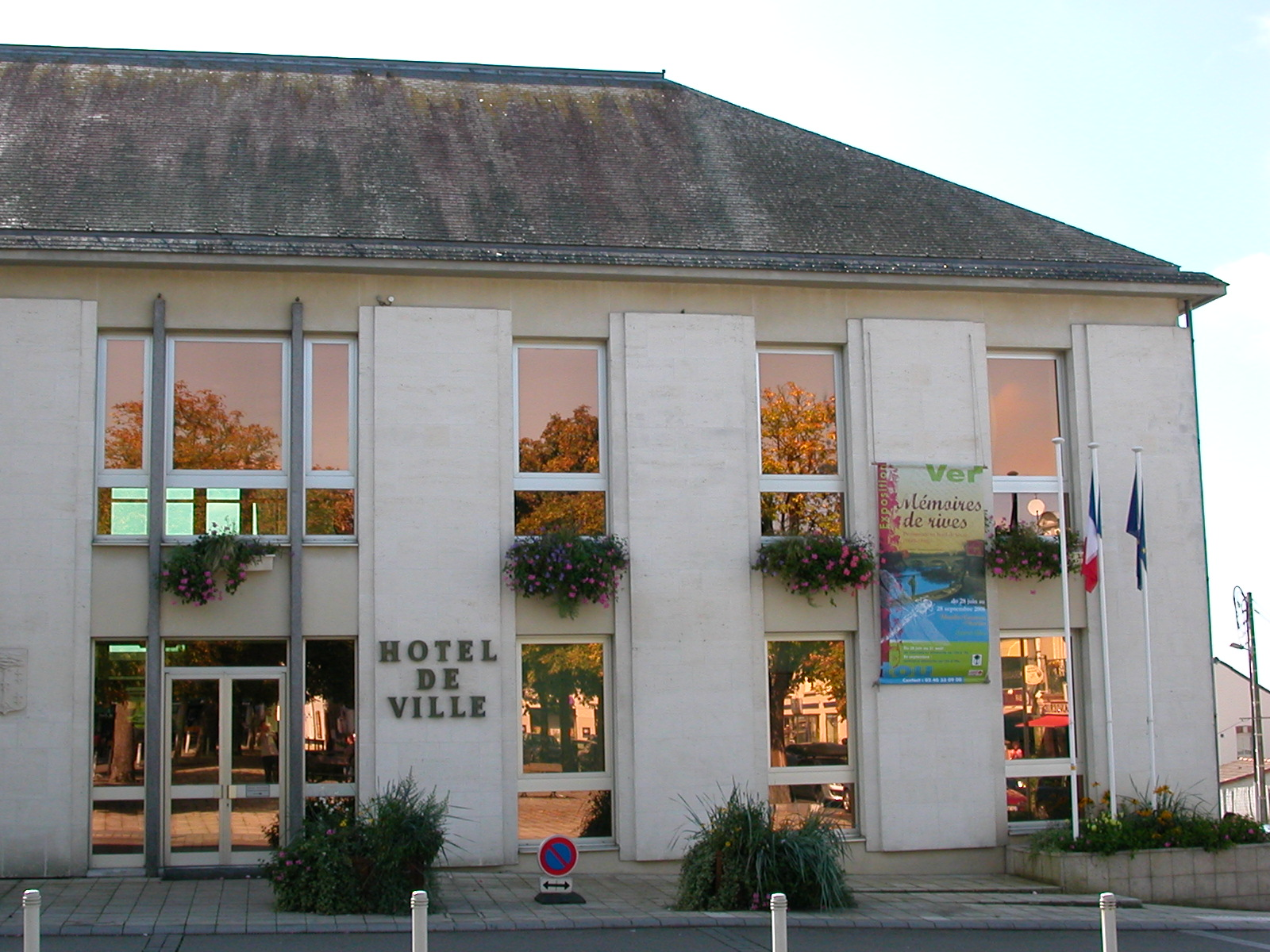
- The main frontage of the Hôtel de Ville in September 2008
- Interactive map of the Hôtel de Ville area

General information
- Type: City hall
- Architectural style: Modern style
- Location: Vertou, France
- Coordinates: 47.1677°N 1.4735°W
- Completed: 1974

The Hôtel de Ville (French pronunciation: [otɛl də vil], City Hall) is a municipal building in Vertou, Loire-Atlantique, in western France, standing on Place Saint-Martin.

== History ==
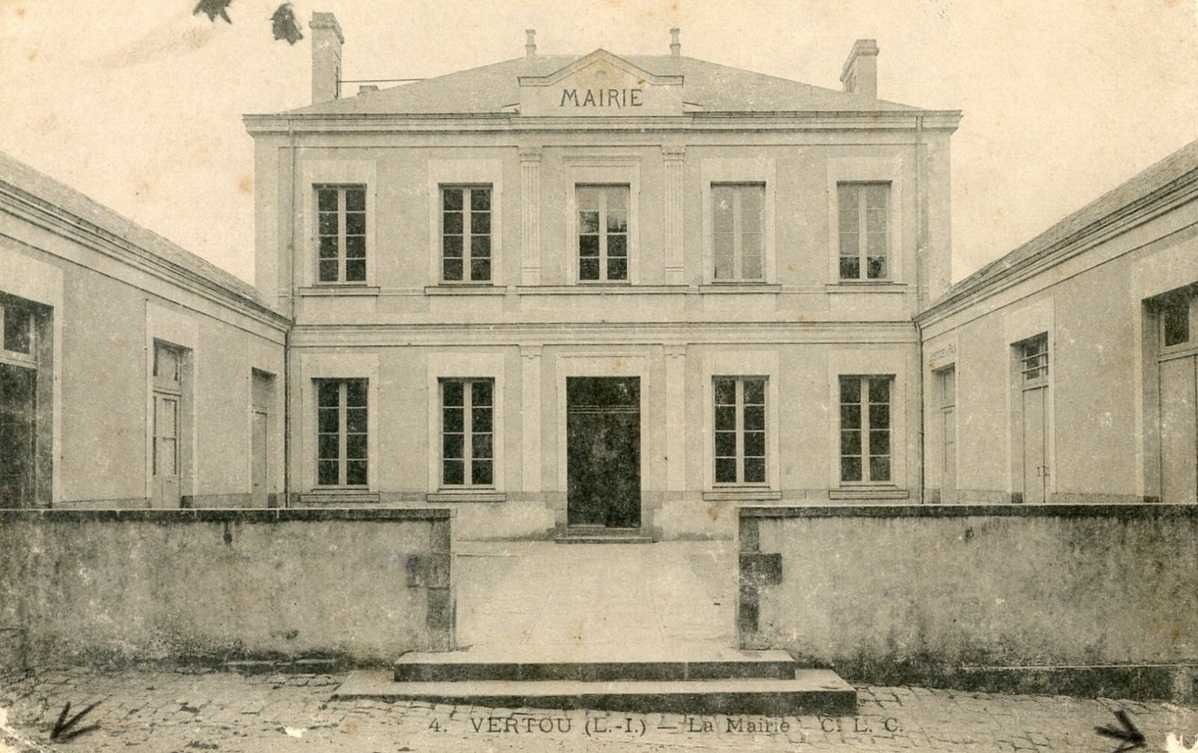
The old town hall

After the French Revolution the town council originally met in the house of the mayor of the time. This arrangement continued until the mid-19th century when the council decided to commission a dedicated town hall. The site they selected was on the east side of the Church of Saint-Martin. The design involved a two-storey main block of five bays and a pair of single-storey wings which were projected forward. The main block contained the municipal office, while the right-hand wing accommodated the justice of the peace court. The central bay featured a square-headed doorway with a stone surround on the ground floor, and a casement window with a stone surround and a hood mould on the first floor. The central bay was flanked by pilasters supporting an entablature, a cornice and a pediment inscribed with the word "Mairie" (town hall). The other bays were fenestrated by casement windows with stone surrounds.

In the early 1970s, following significant population growth, the council led by the mayor, Luc Dejoie, decided to demolish the old town hall and to commission a modern structure. The site they selected was on the south side of Place Saint-Martin in an area that had previously been occupied by a hat shop. Negotiations took place with the association diocésaine (diocesan association) which owned the land.

The old town hall, which was in a dilapidated condition, was demolished at an early stage of the development which caused some disruption to local services. The new building was designed in the modern style, was built in concrete and glass and was completed in 1974. The design involved a symmetrical main frontage of seven bays facing onto the square. The central bay featured a tripartite glass doorway on the ground floor and a tri-partite casement window on the first floor. The other bays were fenestrated by grey-framed casement windows on both floors, and the bays were all flanked by full-height concrete panels, which were slightly projected forward.

Between 2018 and 2020, the area behind the town hall was developed to create a modern reception hall which was accessed from Place Saint-Martin rather than through the former public entrance on Rue Aristide Briand. The work was carried out at a cost of €965,000 to a design by CréiD design and included a new Salle des Mariages (wedding room). Further work to overhaul the heating systems at a cost of €3,800,000 was commissioned in February 2024.
