= Saint-Michel-Chef-Chef =

- Commune
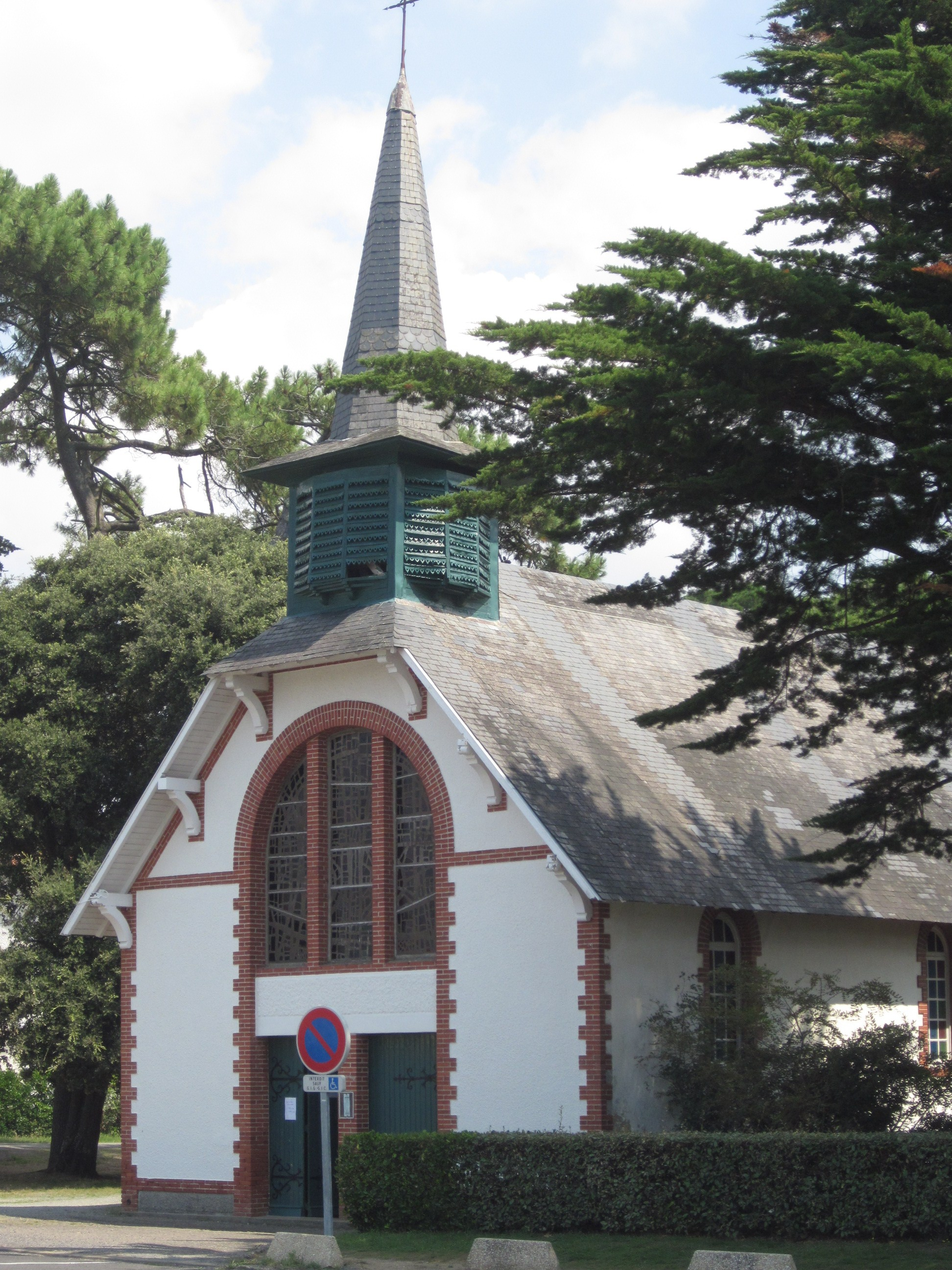
- The chapel of Saint-Anne de Tharon, in Saint-Michel-Chef-Chef

- Coat of arms
- Location of Saint-Michel-Chef-Chef
- Location within France Location within Pays de la Loire
- Coordinates: 47°10′54″N 2°08′50″W
- Country: France
- Region: Pays de la Loire
- Department: Loire-Atlantique
- Arrondissement: Saint-Nazaire
- Canton: Pornic
- Intercommunality: CA Pornic Agglo Pays de Retz

Government
  - Mayor (2020–2026): Eloïse Bourreau-Gobin
- Area^{1}: 25.12 km^{2} (9.70 sq mi)
- Elevation: 60 m (200 ft)
- Population (2023): 5,714
  - Density: 227.5/km^{2} (589.1/sq mi)
- Time zone: UTC+01:00 (CET)
  - Summer (DST): UTC+02:00 (CEST)
- INSEE/Postal code: 44182 /44730
- ^{1} French Land Register data, which excludes lakes, ponds, glaciers > 1 km^{2} (0.386 sq mi or 247 acres) and river estuaries.

Saint-Michel-Chef-Chef (French pronunciation: [sɛ̃ miʃɛl ʃɛf ʃɛf]; Breton: Sant-Mikael-Keveger) is a commune in the Loire-Atlantique department in western France. Its inhabitants, known as Michelois, numbered 5,714 as of 2023.

The commune of Saint-Michel-Chef-Chef includes the seaside resort of Tharon-Plage and is also known as the home of the Biscuiterie Saint-Michel, which produces the "galette Saint-Michel" among many other products. Though the original factory lies in the territory of the town, the headquarters have been delocalized in Contres, France

== Geography ==
The commune is part of historical Brittany, in the traditional country of the pays de Retz.

Saint-Michel-Chef-Chef is located on the Côte de Jade, 17 km south of Saint-Nazaire and 50 km west of Nantes, at the western end of the pays de Retz. It lies 8 km north of Pornic, the main city of the community of communes (Pornic Agglo Pays de Retz) to which the town belongs.

Three coastal rivers flows within the communal territory: the Calais, the Berno and the Tharon. The last one gave its name to the seaside resort of Tharon-Plage.

== Etymology ==
The locality's name is attested as Chemicherium in the 12th century, and Sancti Michaelis de Chevecier in 1287.

The name Saint-Michel-Chef-Chef, whose etymology is debated, is a deformation of the old form Saint-Michel-de-Chevesché, from the Late Latin Terra de Chevesché, the former name of nearby Pointe Saint-Gildas.

The term Chevesché is a deformation of chevecier-chef, which in ecclesiastical language used to designate the person who watched over the bedside of a church and, by extension, had custody of the treasury. This religious dignitary, who collected the revenues of an abbey (in this case, that of Pornic), lived in a chiefdom (in french, chefferie, hence the chef in the name).

As far as the archangel Saint Michel is concerned, we need only recall that places named Saint-Michel are very common in France, and that they derive from places previously dedicated to a Celtic divinity, Lug, the eponymous deity of Lugdunum (present-day Lyon), assimilated by the Romans to Mercury. The most remarkable case of this filiation is Saint-Michel-Mont-Mercure in Vendée.

The Breton form proposed by the public office for the Breton language is Sant-Mikael-Keveger.

== History ==
=== Prehistory ===
Occupation of the territory is attested to in the Neolithic, as evidenced by the discovery of the Gâtineaux promontory site and, a little further south, the Souchais menhir. Several other megalithic sites (dolmens and menhirs) existed in the commune, but were destroyed at the end of the 19th century.

=== Antiquity ===
Unchecked sources report that Saint-Michel was a leprosarium in the 4th century.

=== Middle Ages ===
Saint-Michel-Chef-Chef was part of the châtellenie, barony, then duchy-pairie of Retz.

Around 1104, Garsire de Retz donated the church to the Saint-Serge Abbey in Angers.

=== Contemporary period ===
During the de-Christianization of 1792-1800 following the French Revolution, Saint-Michel was renamed Sablons.

During the 19th century, some villas are getting build south of the town, constituting a new neighbourhood more oriented towards the seafront. In the early 20th century, with the advent of paid vacations for workers, many city dwellers from Nantes or even Paris headed for the coast. This new summer tourism led to the development of a number of seaside resorts, including Tharon-Plage, 2 km south of the center of the town, which continues to expand today.

At the end of the Second World War, when the Loire-Inférieure region was liberated in August 1944, Saint-Michel-Chef-Chef was among the territories still occupied by the Germans in the Saint-Nazaire pocket, stretching from the Vilaine estuary to Pornic. Here, liberation only took place on May 11, 1945, three days after the surrender of the German army.

== Territorial organisation ==
The municipal territory is organized into three main areas.

=== A rural east side ===
The first, to the east of the departmental road that crosses the territory from north to south, is a rural area with a few hamlets and farms. The Gâtineaux pond and the hamlets of Aubaudière, Haute Aiguillon, Haut-Village and Chanteloup dot the landscape. This area is crossed by the D78 towards Saint-Père-en-Retz and another Saint-Michel biscuits production site straddling the two communes, and by the D136 towards Chauvé.

=== Town center of Saint-Michel-Chef-Chef ===
Located in the north-west of the town, flanked by the Atlantic Ocean and the Departementale Expressway, the town center is the first place where the local population settles. It is home to the town hall, the main church and other services such as the post office, a media library, a small cinema, as well as a number of cafés and restaurants. The village is also home to the original Saint Michel cookie factory. The two elementary schools and the supermarket are also in the immediate vicinity. Saint-Michel's beaches include Plage du Redois and Plage de Gohaud, an interesting spot for surfing.

=== Tharon-Plage ===
Tharon lies 2.2 km south-west of the village of Saint-Michel, in the south-western part of the commune. It adjoins the seaside resort of Le Cormier, part of the commune of La Plaine-sur-Mer, from which it is separated by the "ruisseau de la Tabardière". This resort, one of the most important on the Côte de Jade, has been awarded Blue Flag status.

Chalets were first built on the beach in 1895. In 1902, three friends (Ferdinand Boismain, Arthur du Chatelier and François Guillou) signed a joint deed of purchase for a 120 ha 48 ca property located between the Calais and Tharon rivers (including 21 ha of vines), and decided to subdivide the area to sell "Les Sables". They called on Nantes architect Ernest Chevrier to design the complex (one of the resort's main avenues was named after him).

In 1906, the inauguration of the Pornic-Paimbœuf metre-gauge railway line boosted the development of Tharon-Plage. A station was built for the purpose (located where the tourist office now stands). However, the line was closed in 1939.

By 1910, 188 lots had been sold. Buyers came from Nantes, the Pays de Retz and, later, the Angers region. Thus was born Tharon-Plage, the "Pearl of the Côte de Jade".

During the second world war, the beach town has been occupied by the German army and some fortifications were built, still visible today when going towards Le Cormier.

After the war, the resort grew to be what it is known for today: a few apartment complexes have been built, shops and restaurants opened on the see front. A few services and amenities are opened for residents and tourists: the neighborhood has a pharmacy, two bakeries, a post office annex and a small convenience store. However, residents and tourists are still quite dependent on services outside the beach town, notably located in the town center of Saint-Michel or in Pornic.

The Sainte-Anne chapel, bordered by tall pine trees, is the venue for religious ceremonies and cultural events.

In the late 2010s, the sea front between the Ernest Chevrier avenue and the Comberge marina harbour has been remodeled to ensure better and safer mobility and access to the beach.

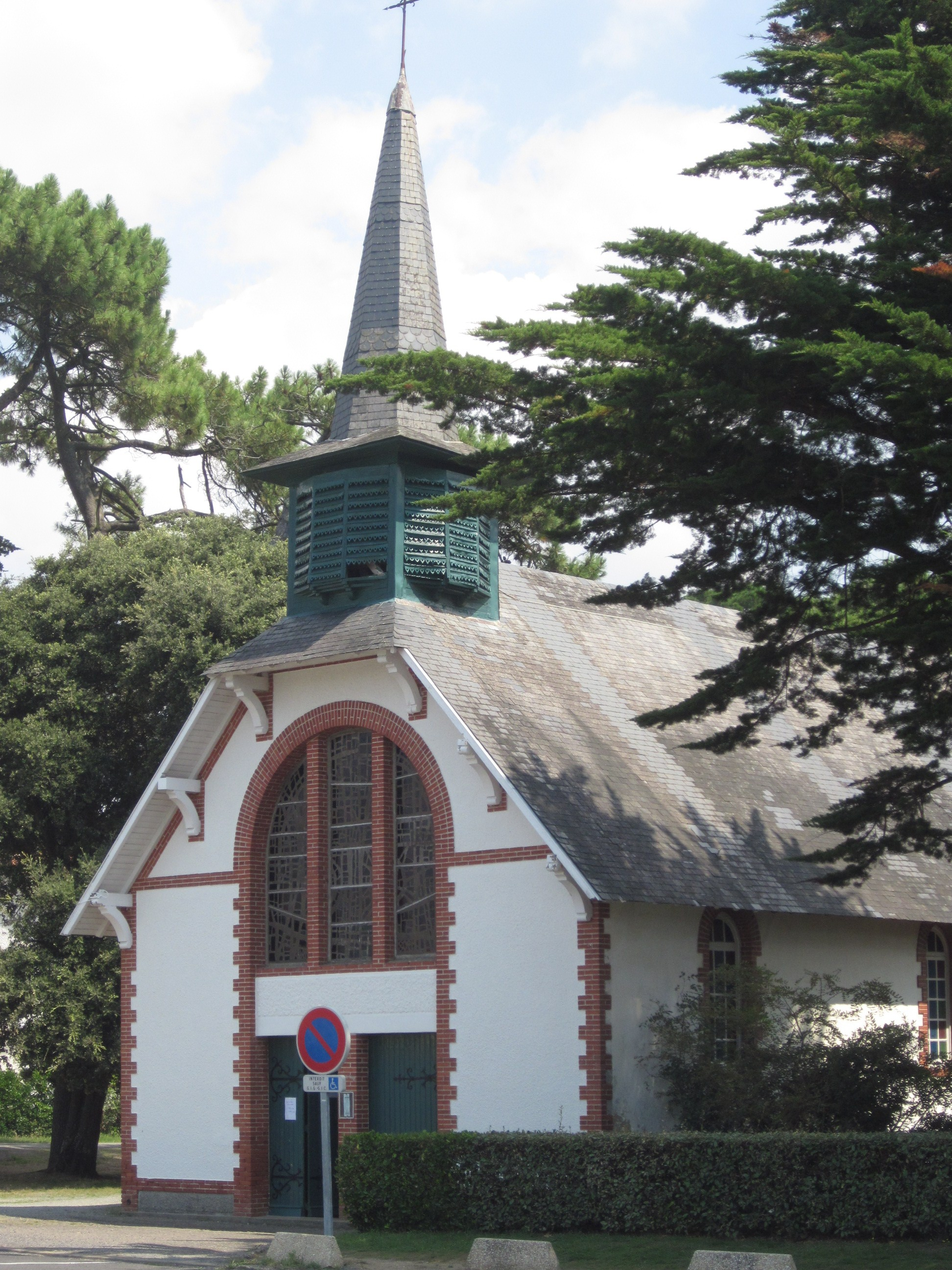
Sainte-Anne Chapel

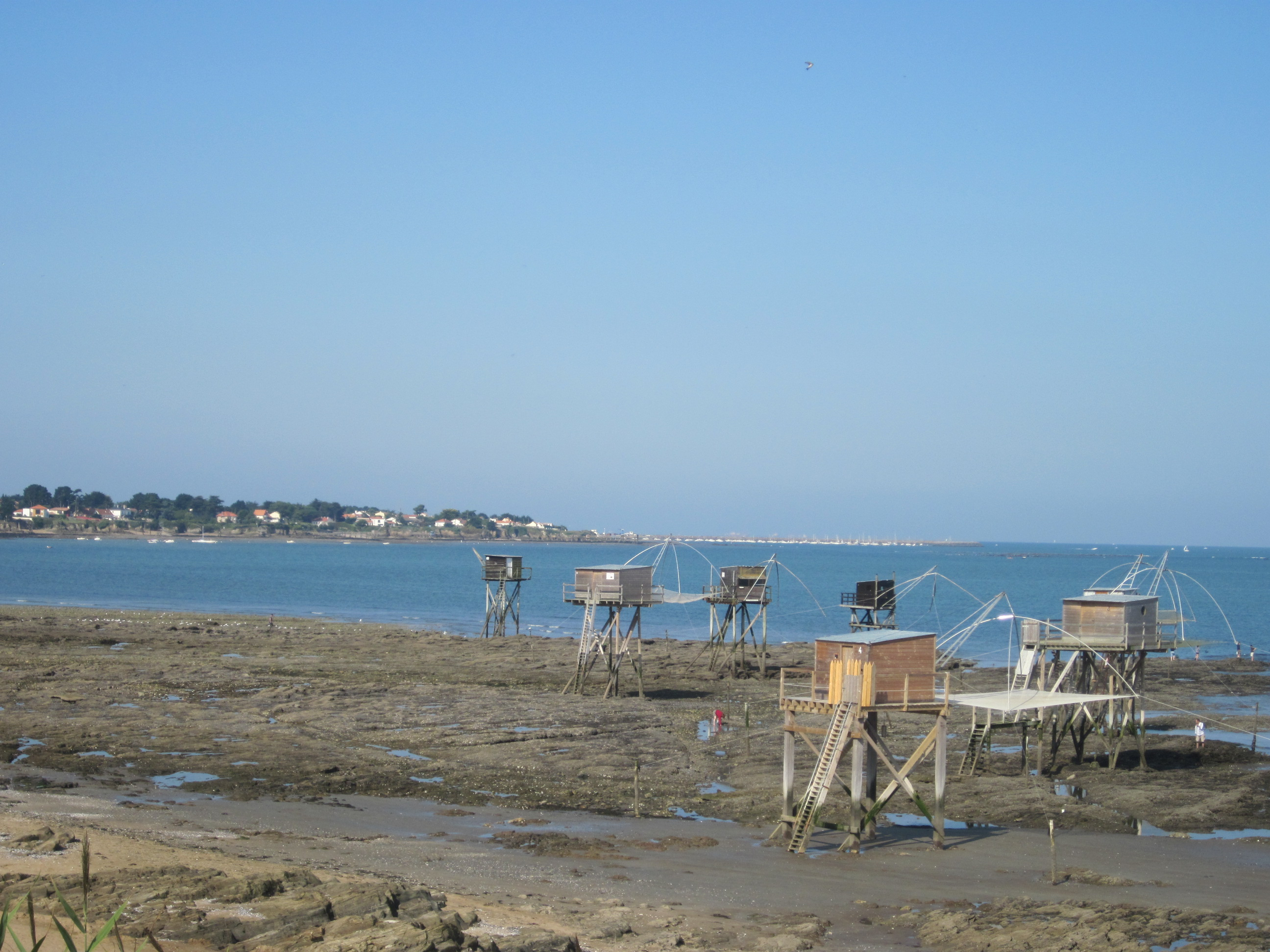
Tharon-Plage at low tide

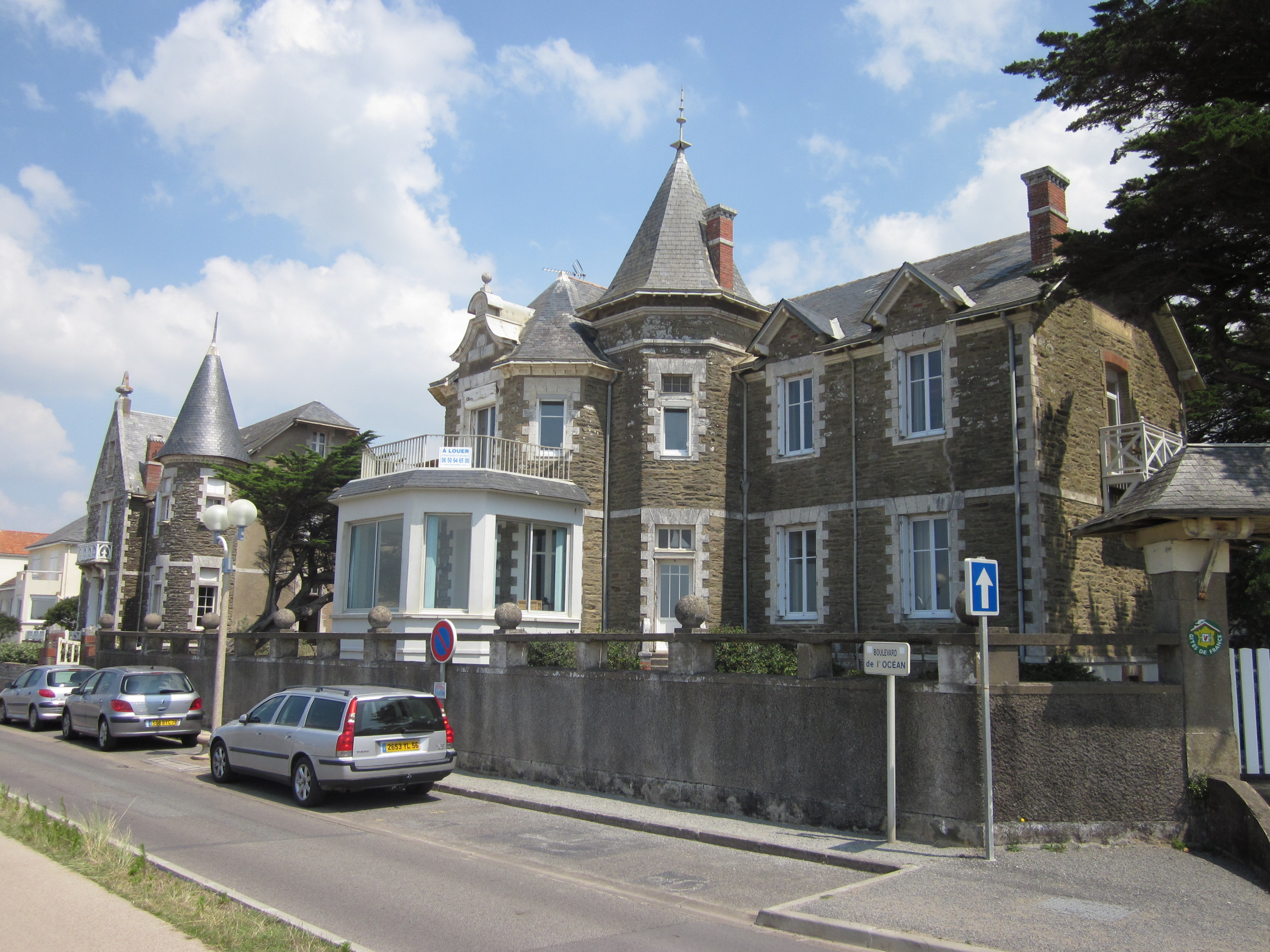
Villas on the sea front

== Population ==
=== Demography ===
According to the Insee classification in 2020, Saint-Michel-Chef-Chef is part of the Pornic functional area and the Saint-Nazaire urban area. The first has a population of 37,126 in 2021, organized around the town of Pornic, an important hub in the département. The second, with 190,847 inhabitants at the same date, is organized around the port and industrial city of Saint-Nazaire, the fourth-largest regional hub.

The commune is also part of the Pornic Agglo Pays de Retz agglomeration community with 14 other communes.

Historical population
| Year | Pop. | ±% p.a. |
|---|---|---|
| 1968 | 2,242 | — |
| 1975 | 2,447 | +1.26% |
| 1982 | 2,517 | +0.40% |
| 1990 | 2,663 | +0.71% |
| 1999 | 3,176 | +1.98% |
| 2007 | 4,234 | +3.66% |
| 2012 | 4,503 | +1.24% |
| 2017 | 4,993 | +2.09% |
| 2023 | 5,714 | +2.27% |
Source: INSEE

== Local culture and heritage ==
=== Lieux et monuments ===
- Neo-Renaissance Saint-Michel church (late 19th century), featuring a statue of Saint Michel overcoming the devil by Vallet. Numerous seafood decorations. A plaque commemorating the 14-18 war is located on the right as you enter, beneath a stained-glass window depicting acts of war in the trenches.
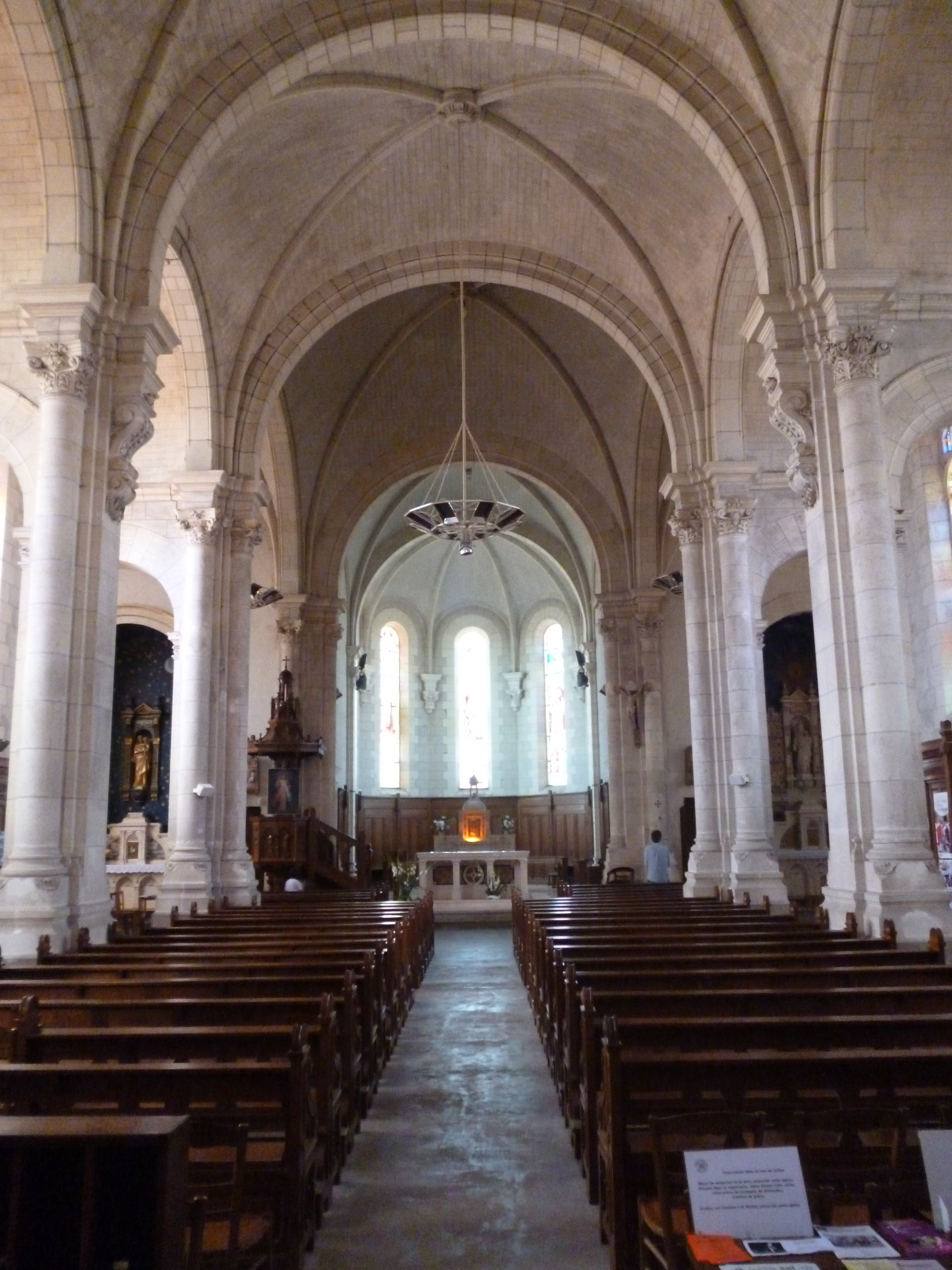
Inside of the church

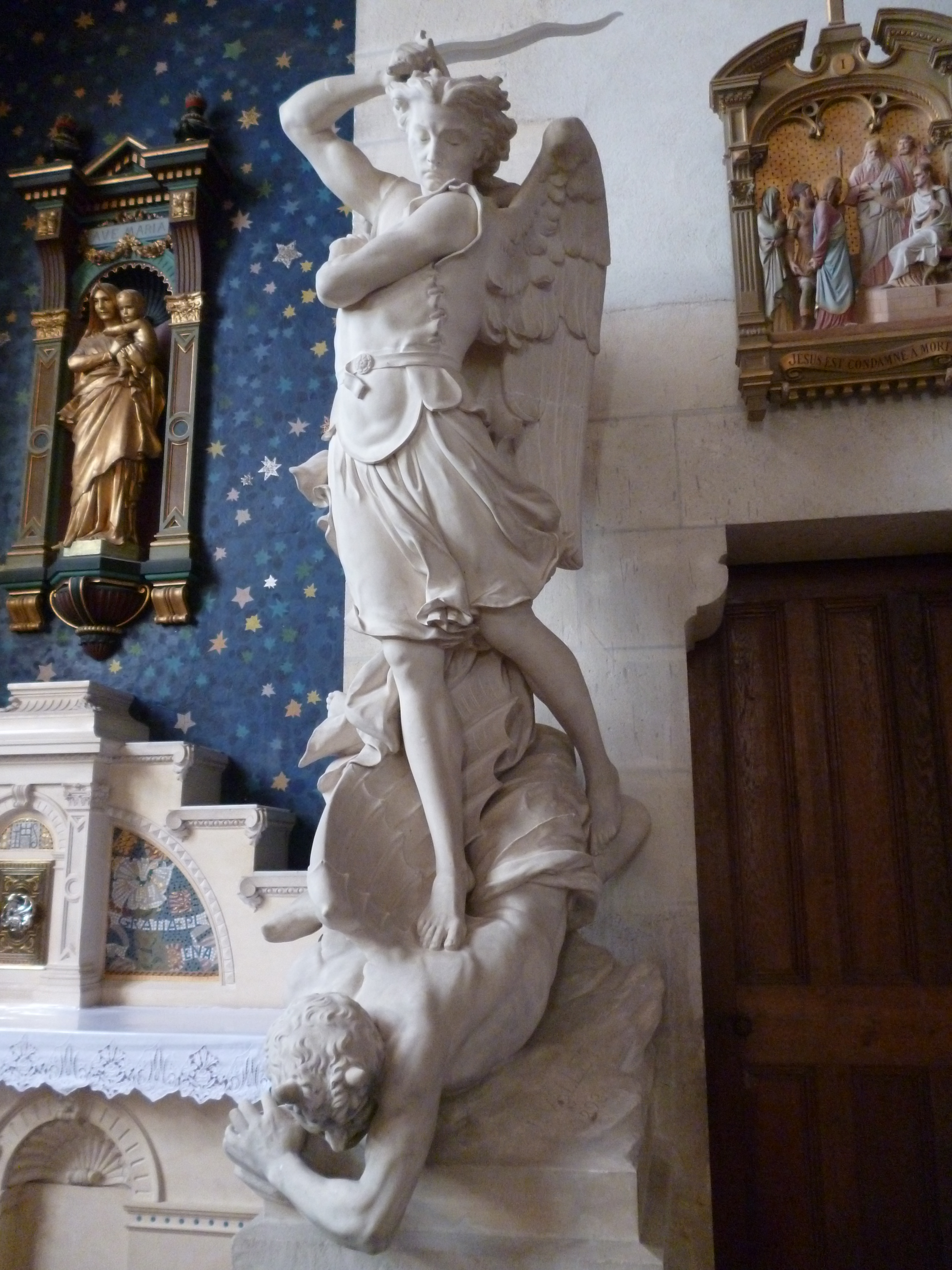
Saint Michel overcoming the devil

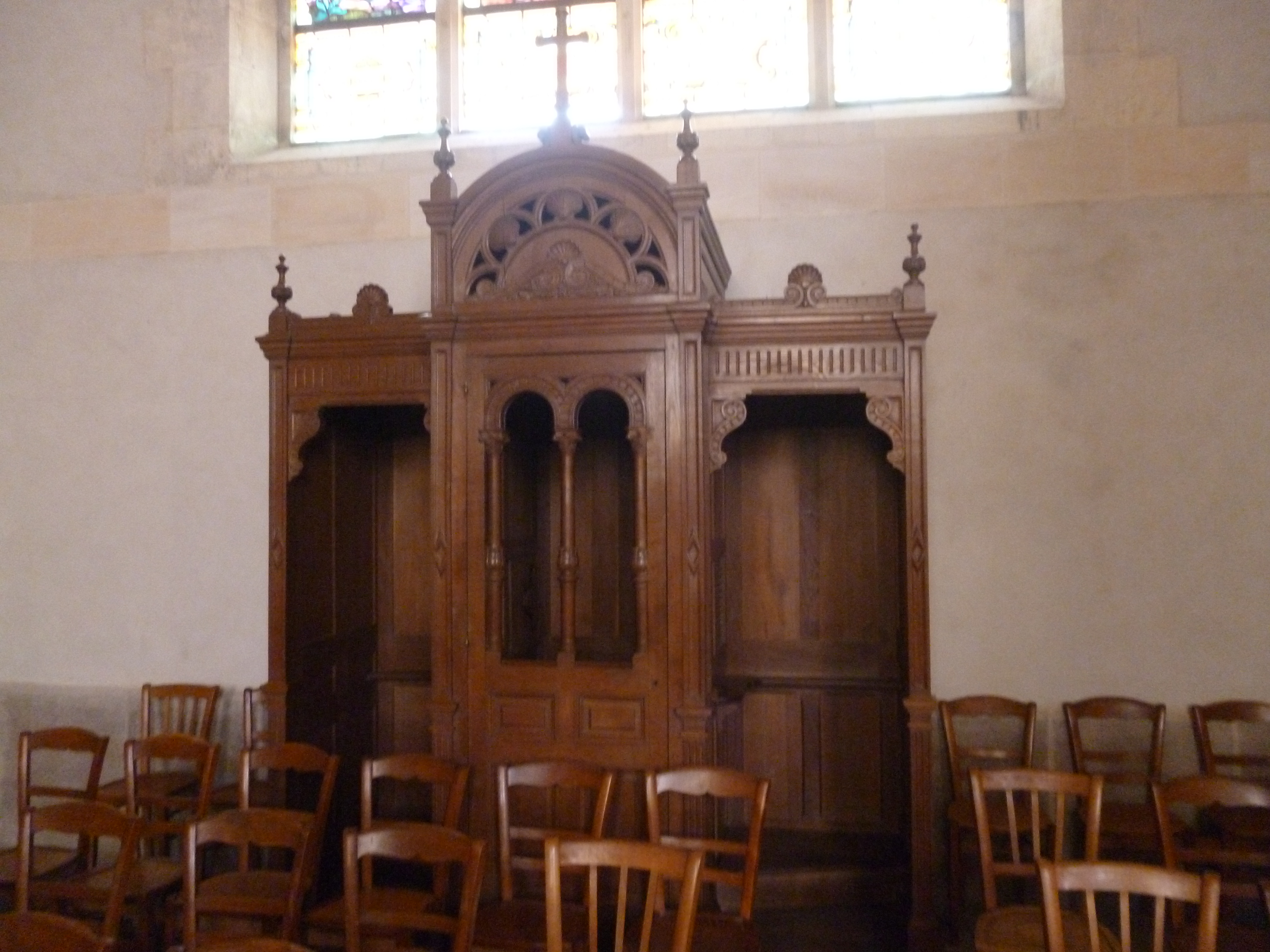
Confessional.

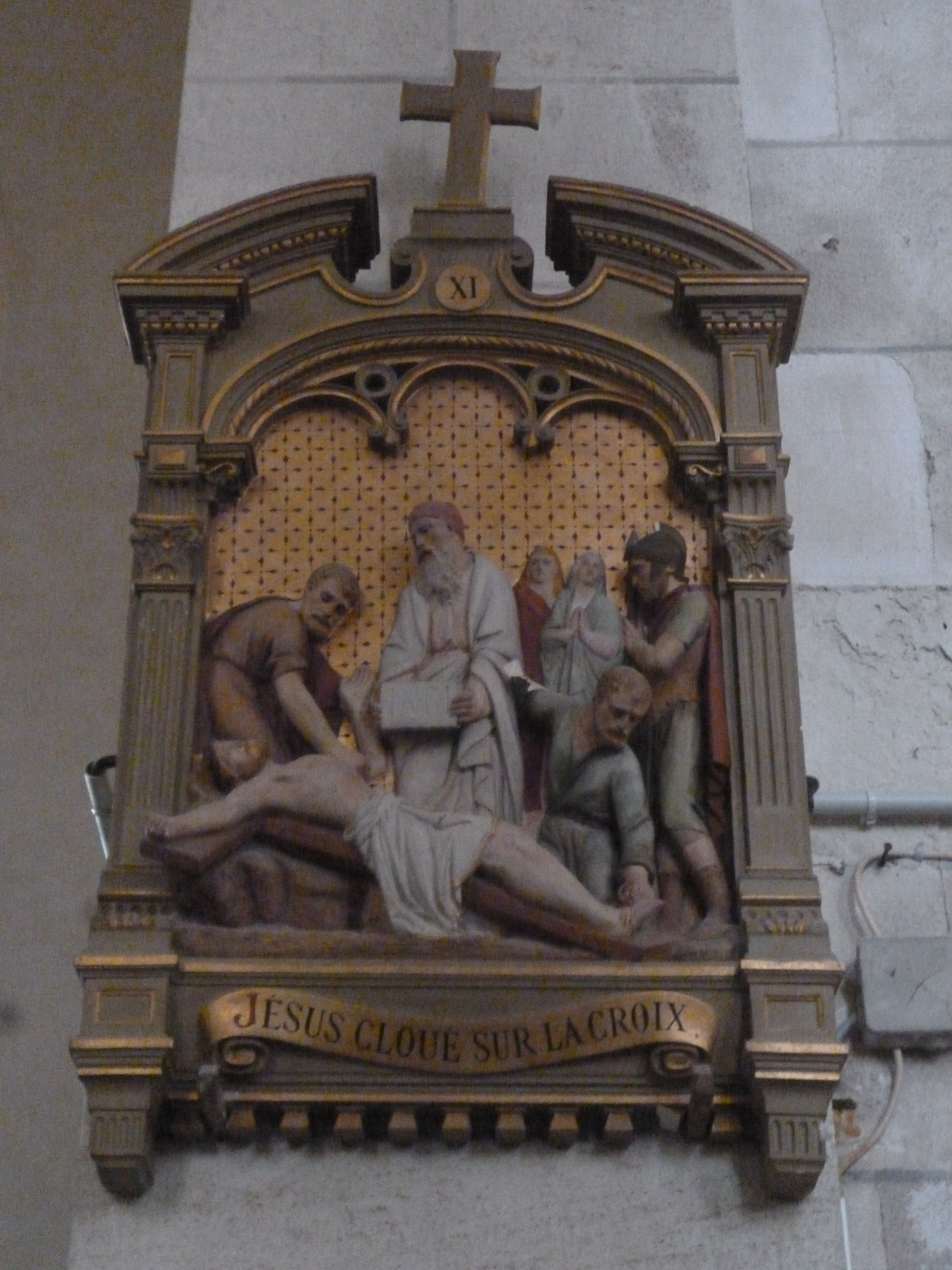
Cross

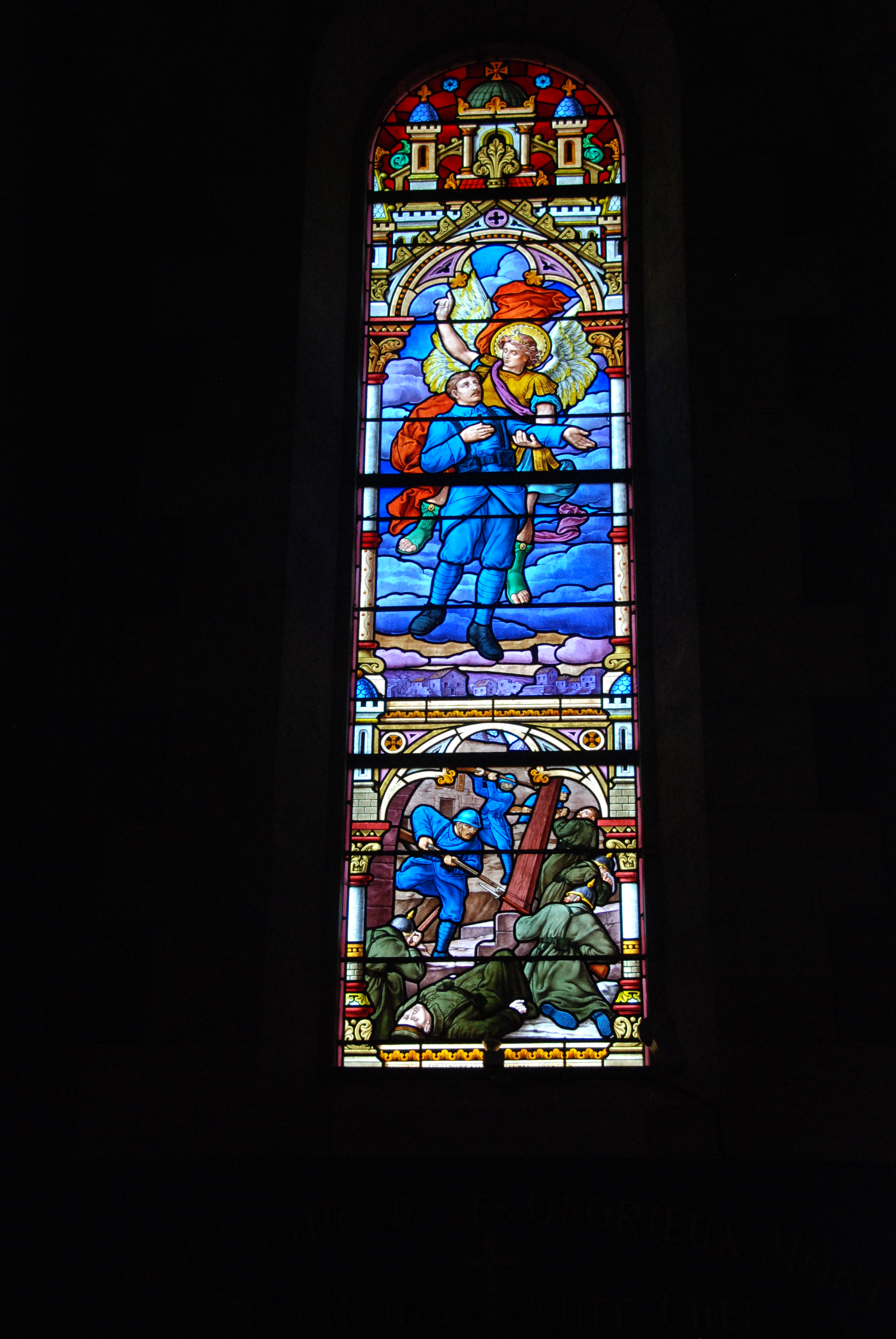
Stained glass window commemorating the 14-18 war.

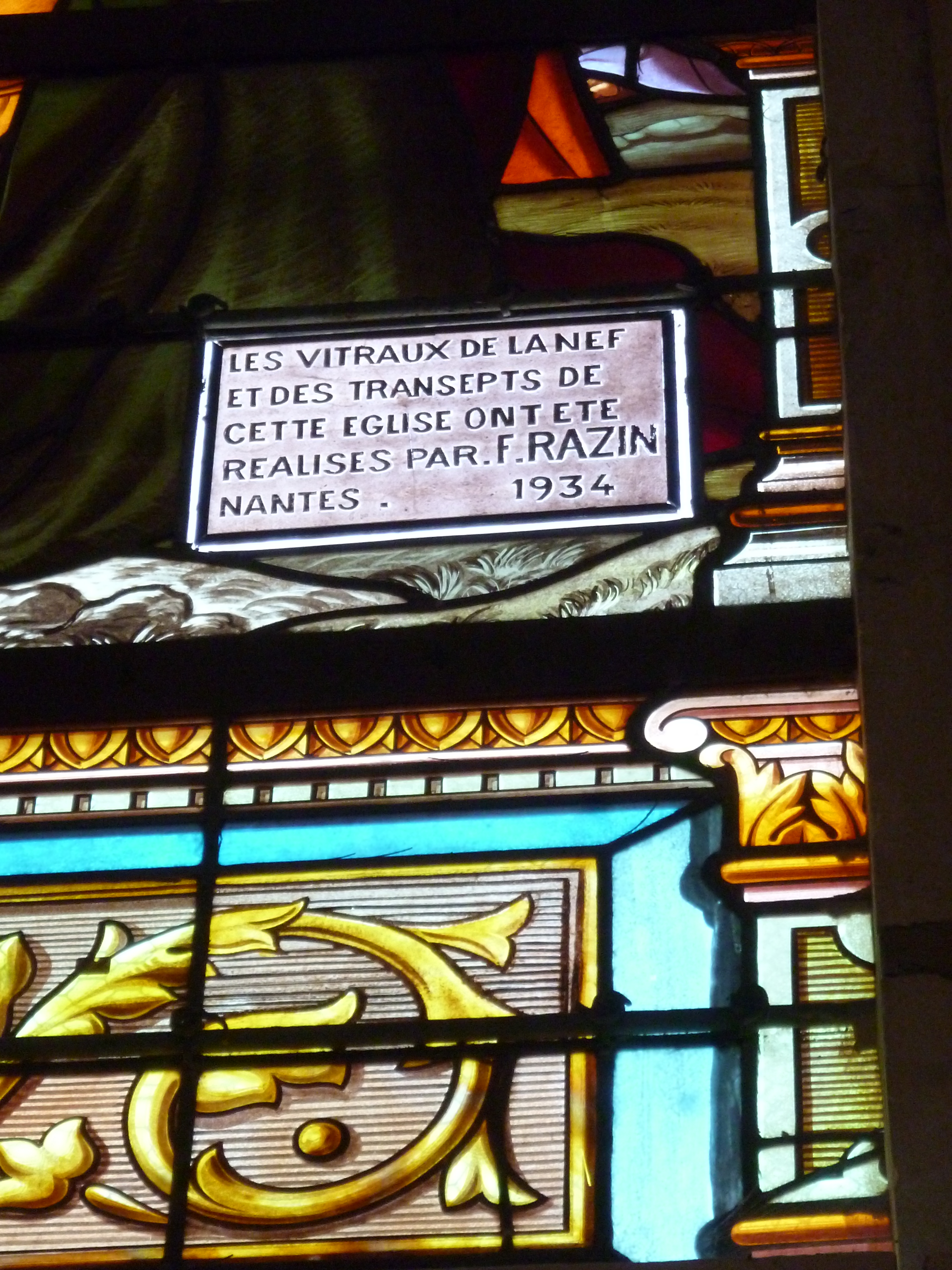
Stained glass window detail

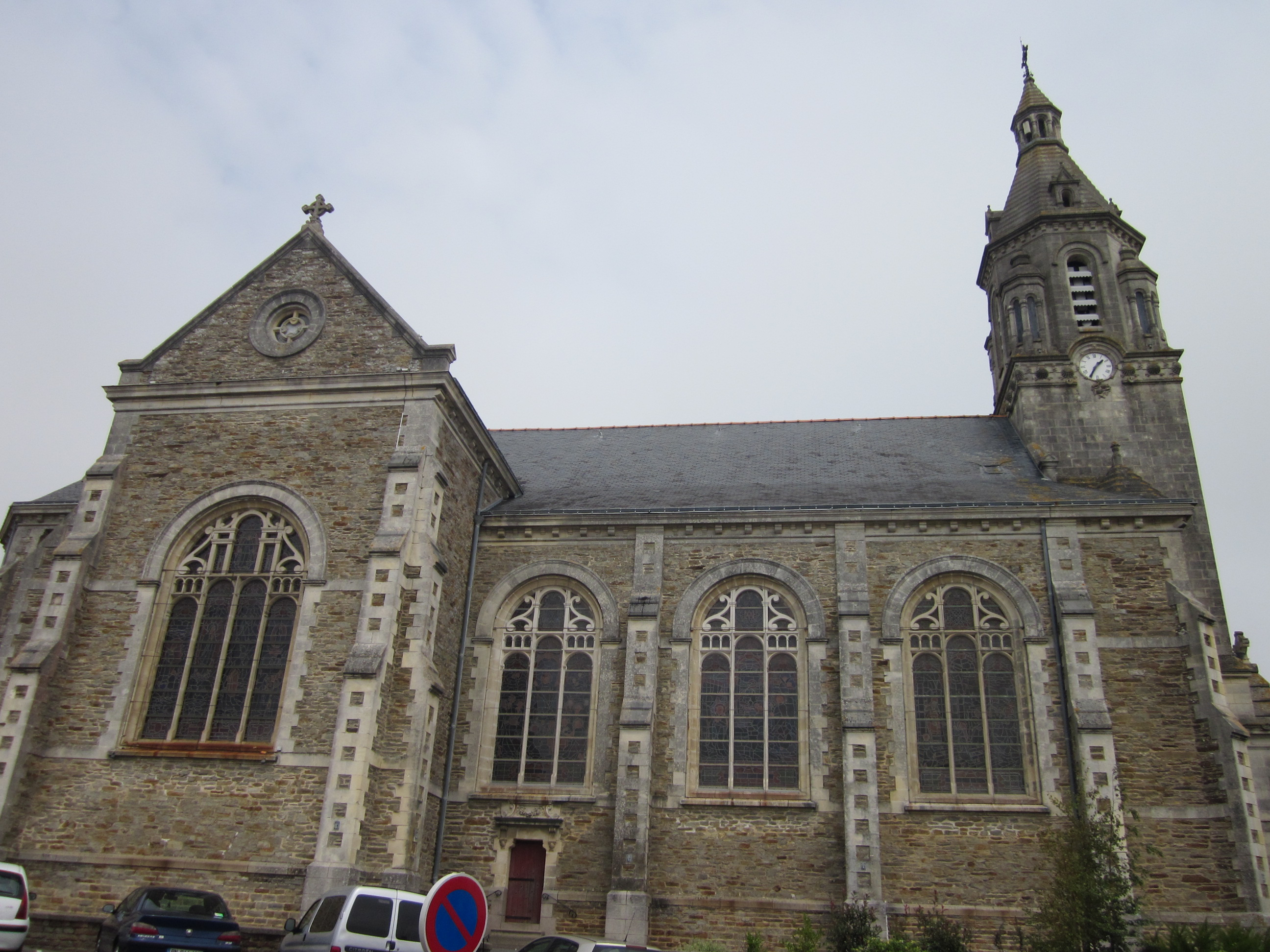

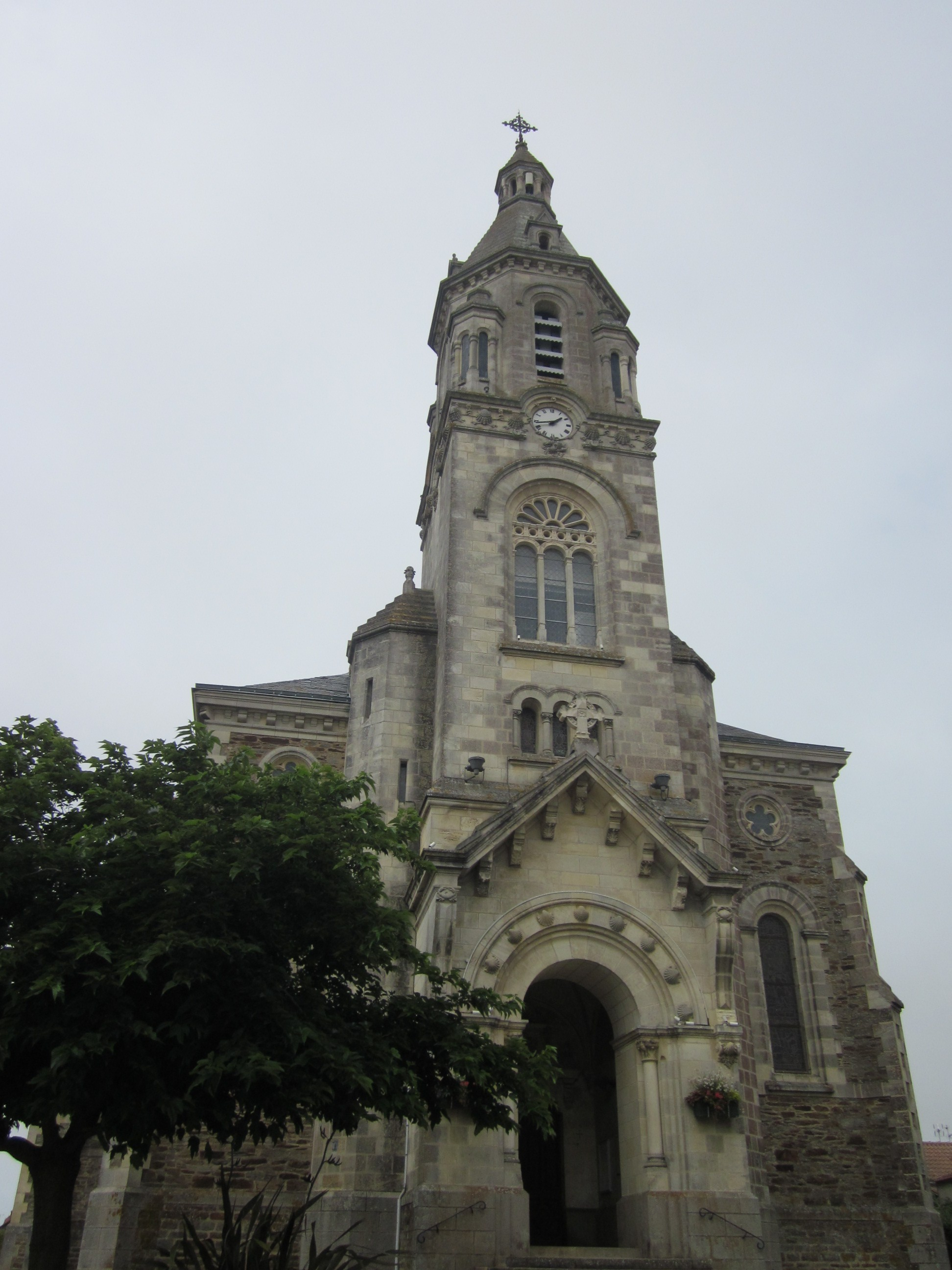
- Sainte-Anne-de-Tharon chapel, home to objects from the Buzay abbey, including the oldest crucifix in the Pays de Retz (dating from the 14th century), another Christ from the 16th century and a statue from the 18th century.
- Castle of Tharon: only vestiges remain, in particular a ruined tower.
- La Cossonnière castle.
- Old fishermen's houses.
- Windmills at Beaulieu, La Proutière and La Sicaudais (1842).
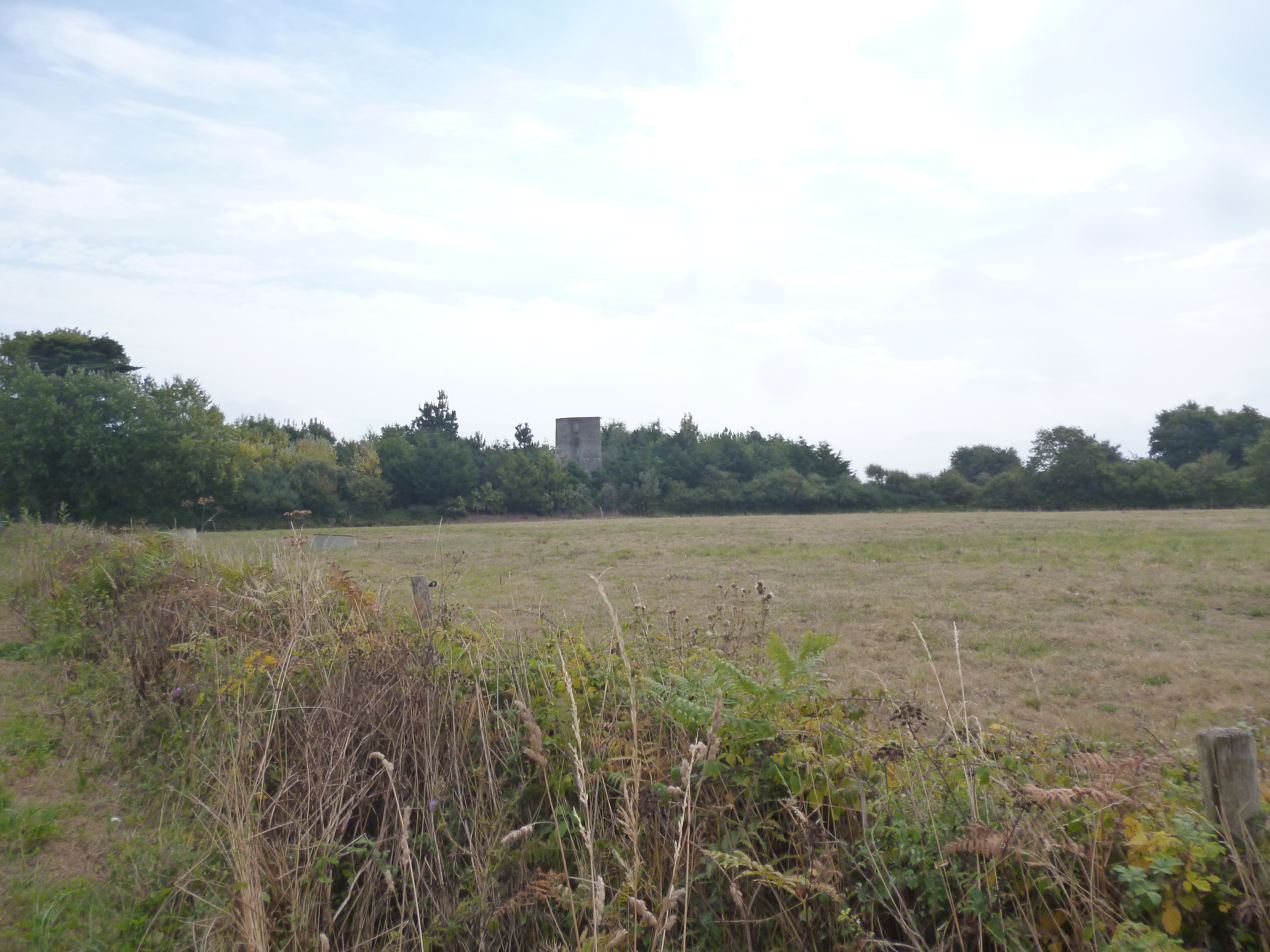
Moulin de la Proutière.
- Calvaries, ossuary and wayside crosses.
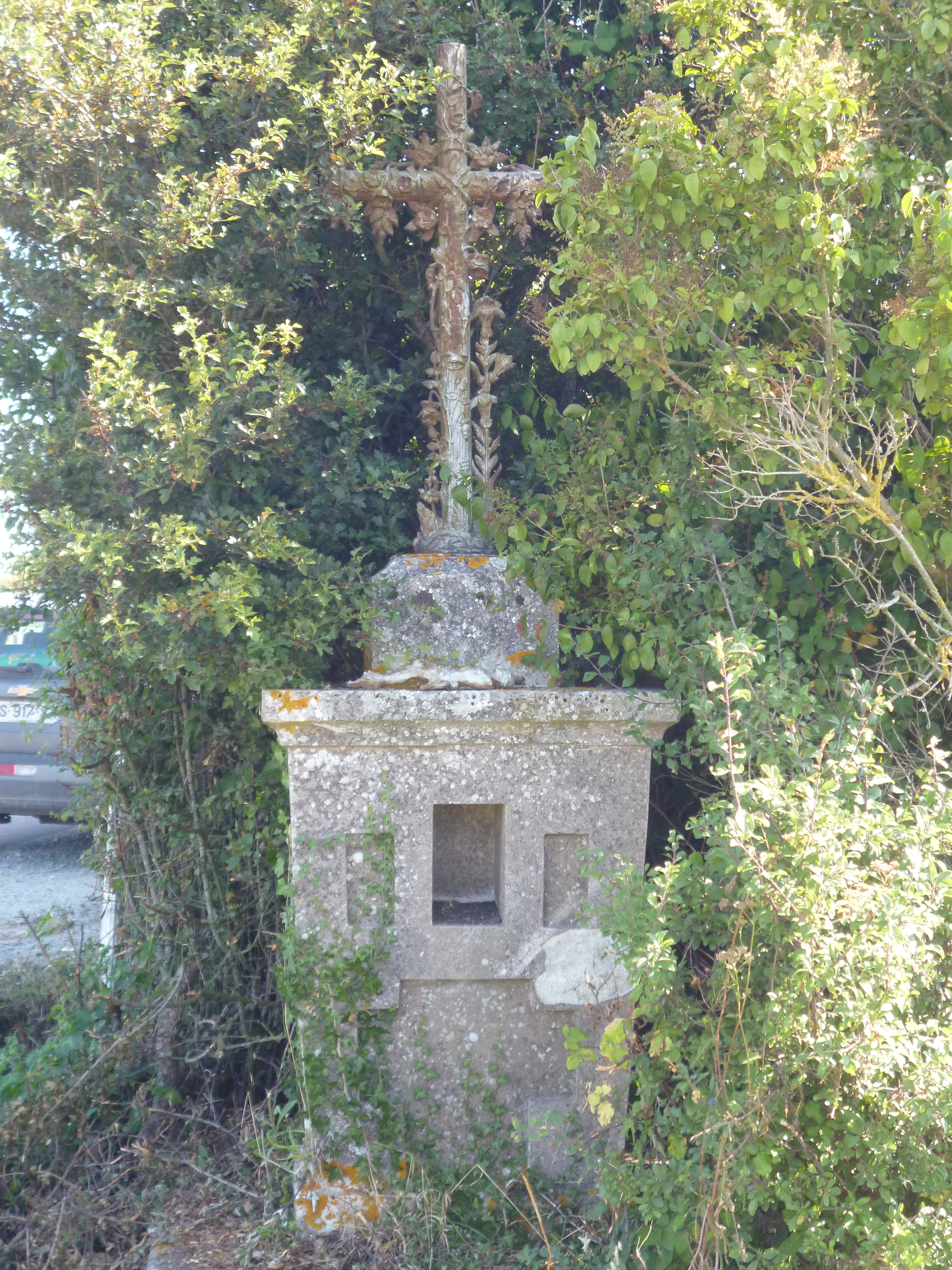

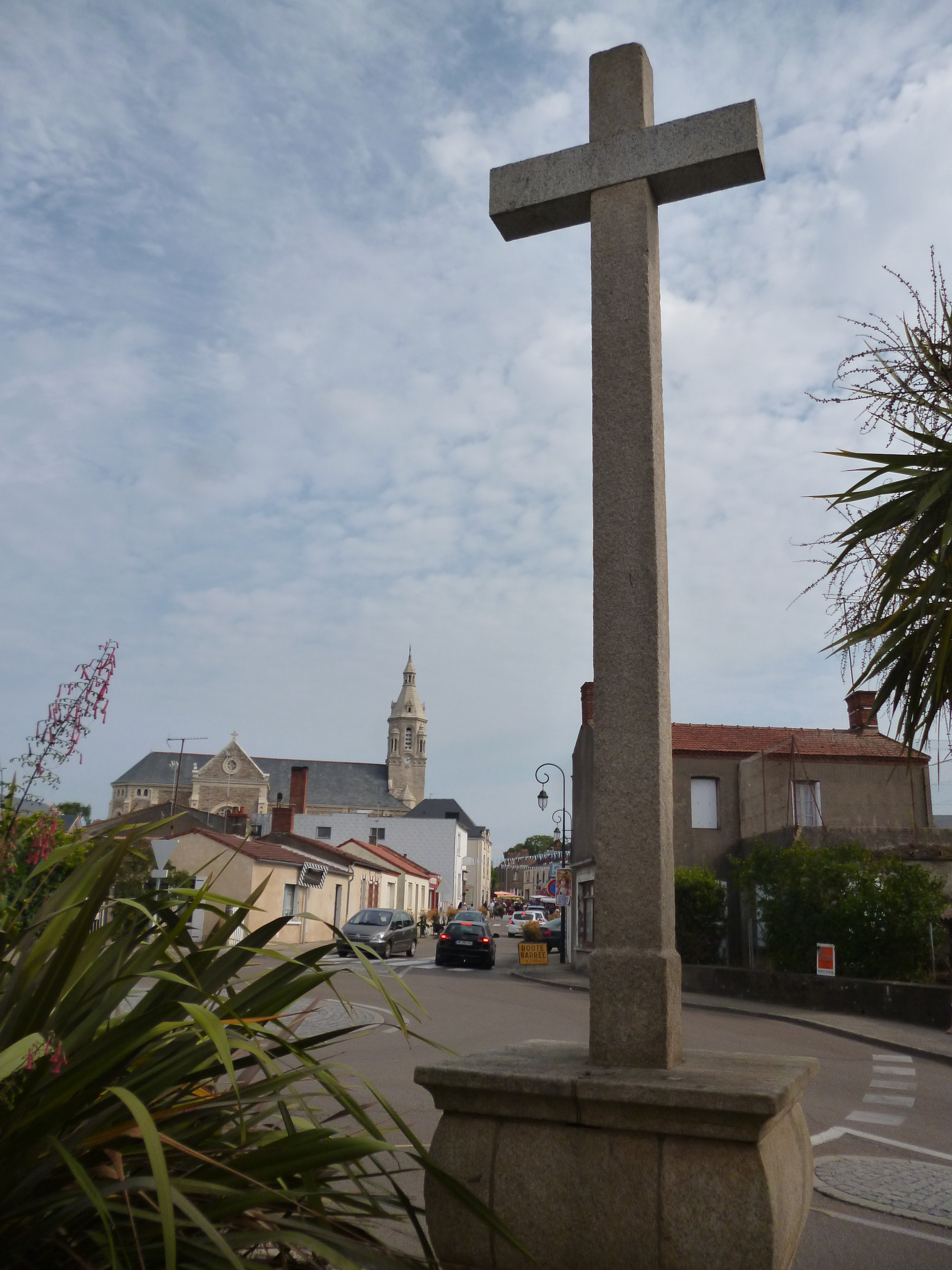

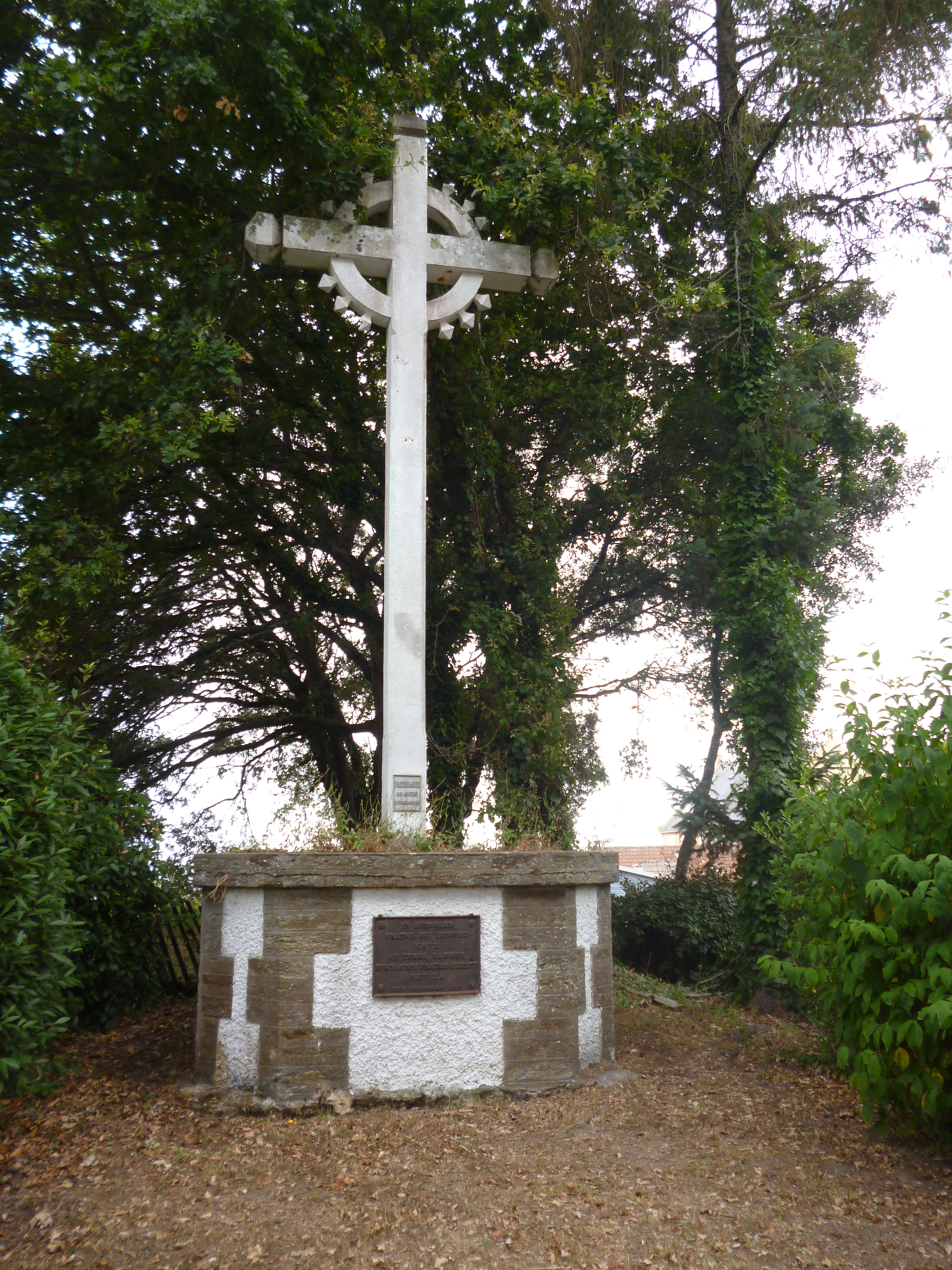

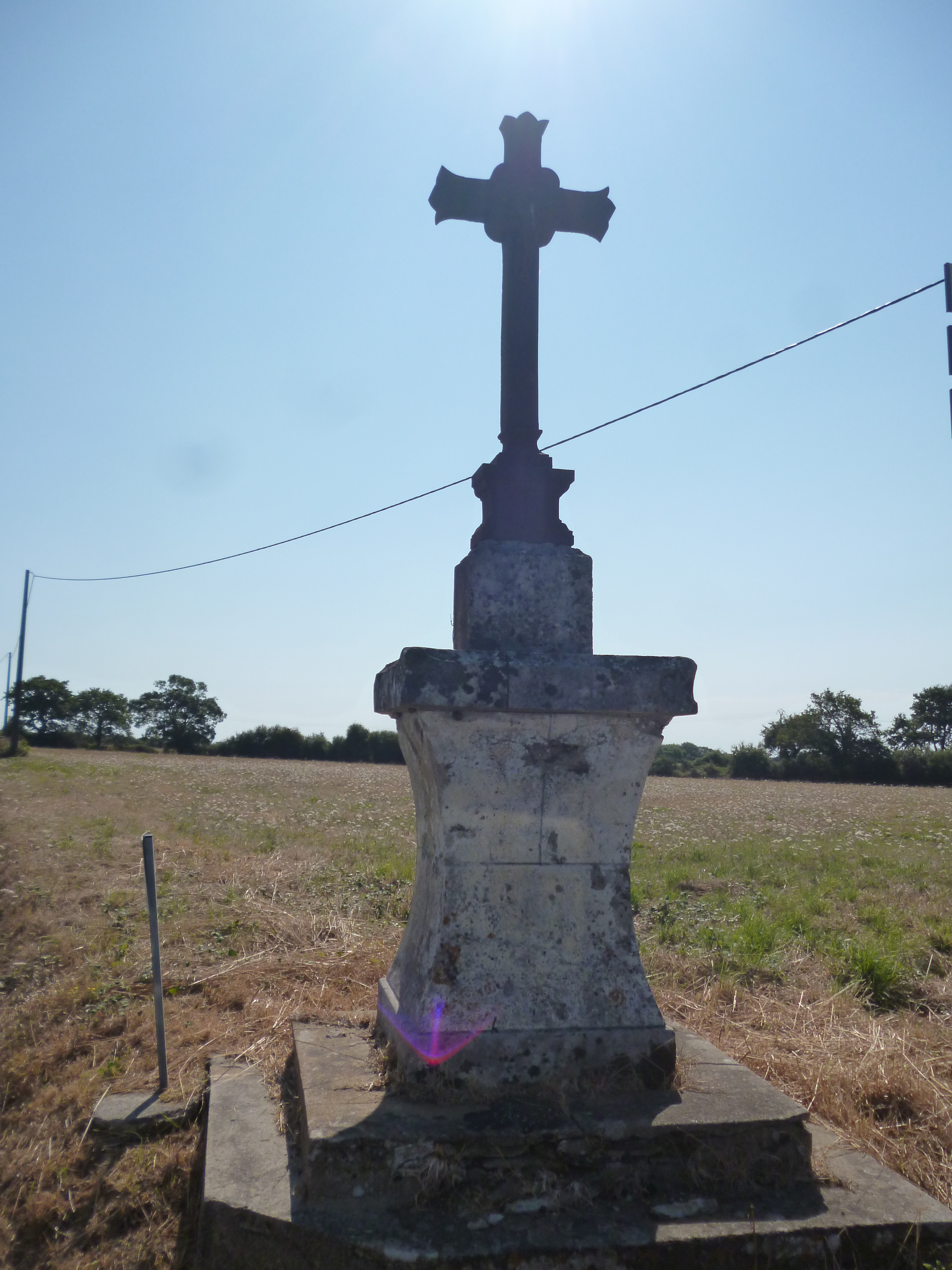

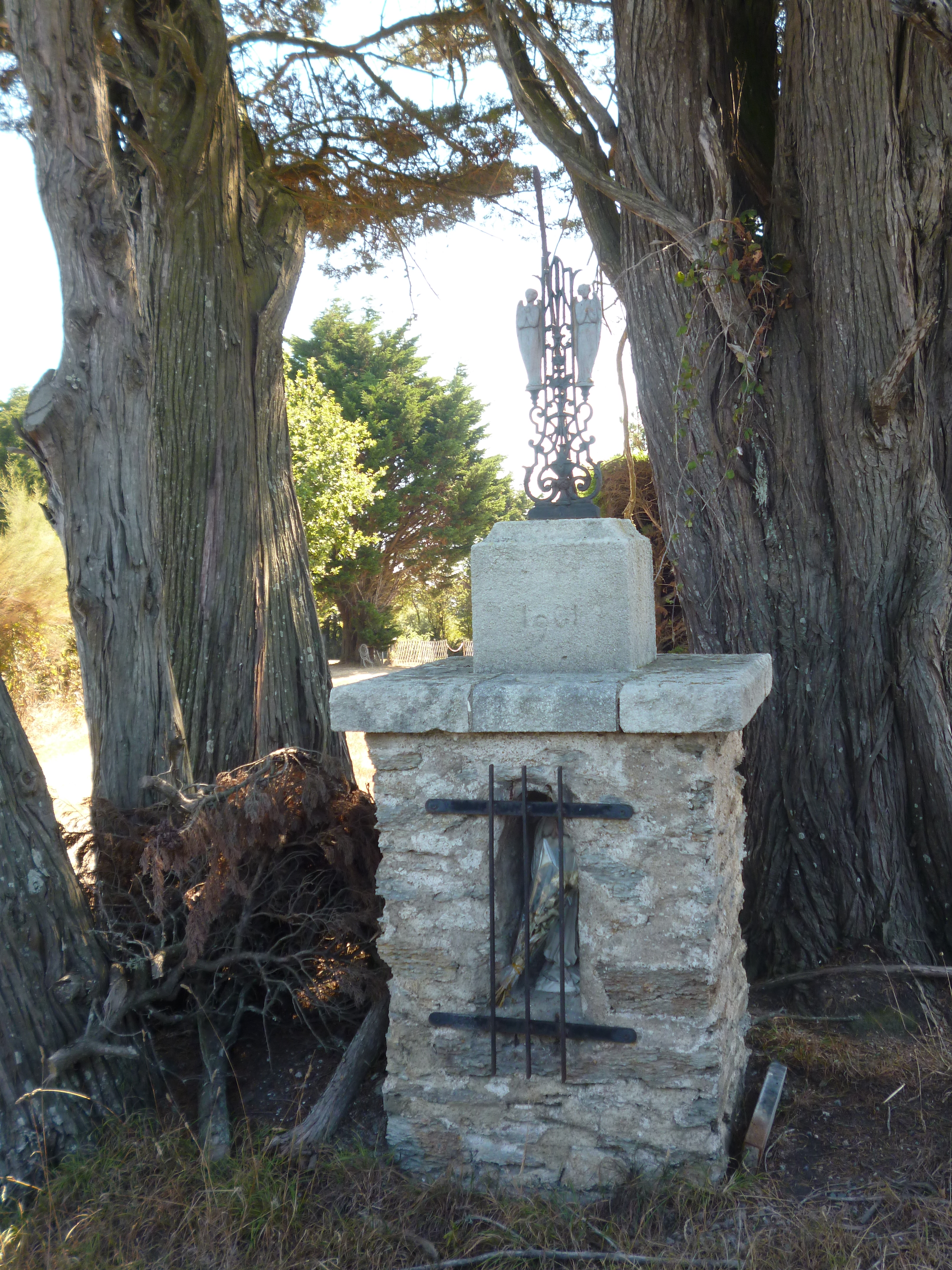

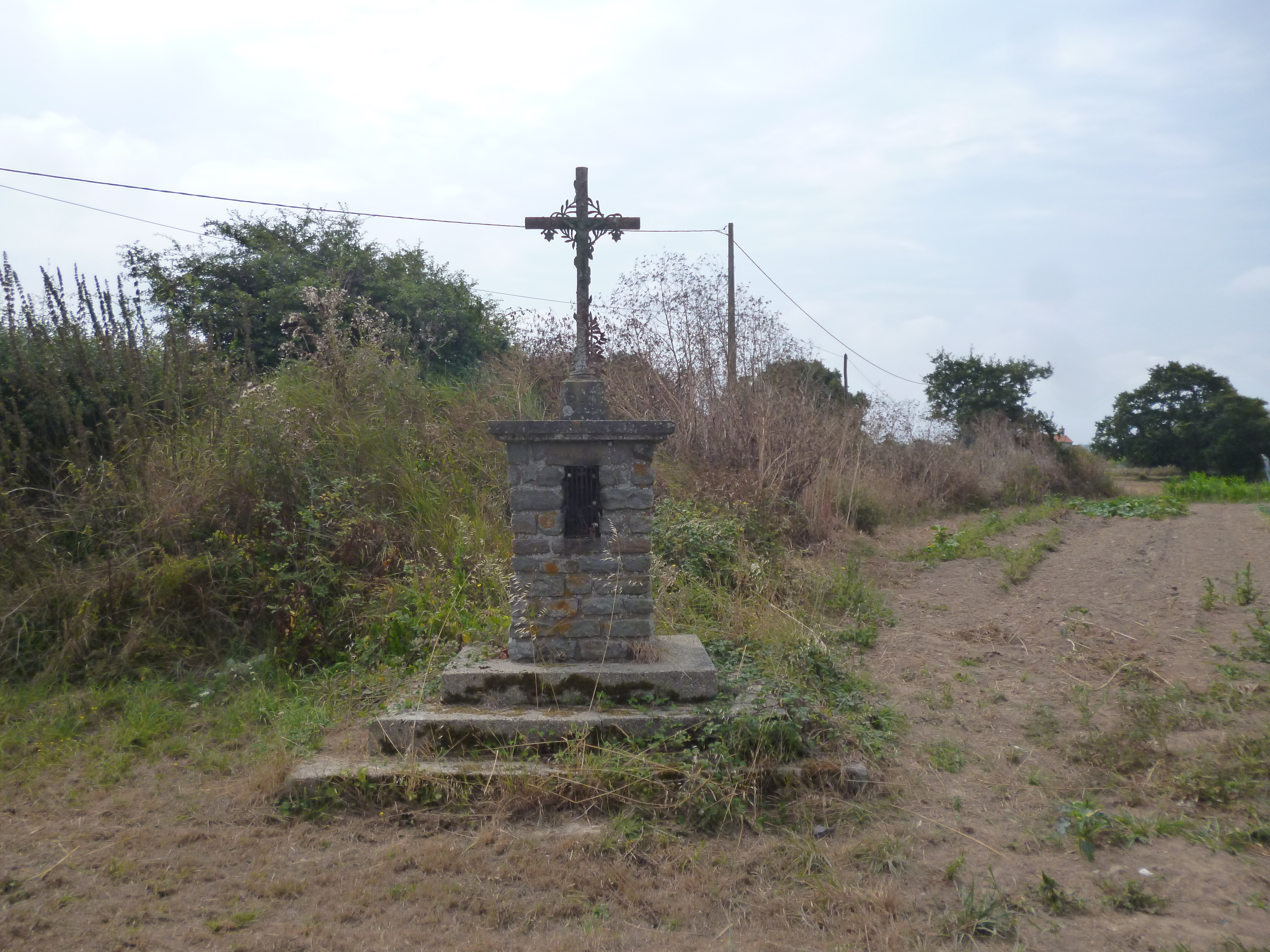

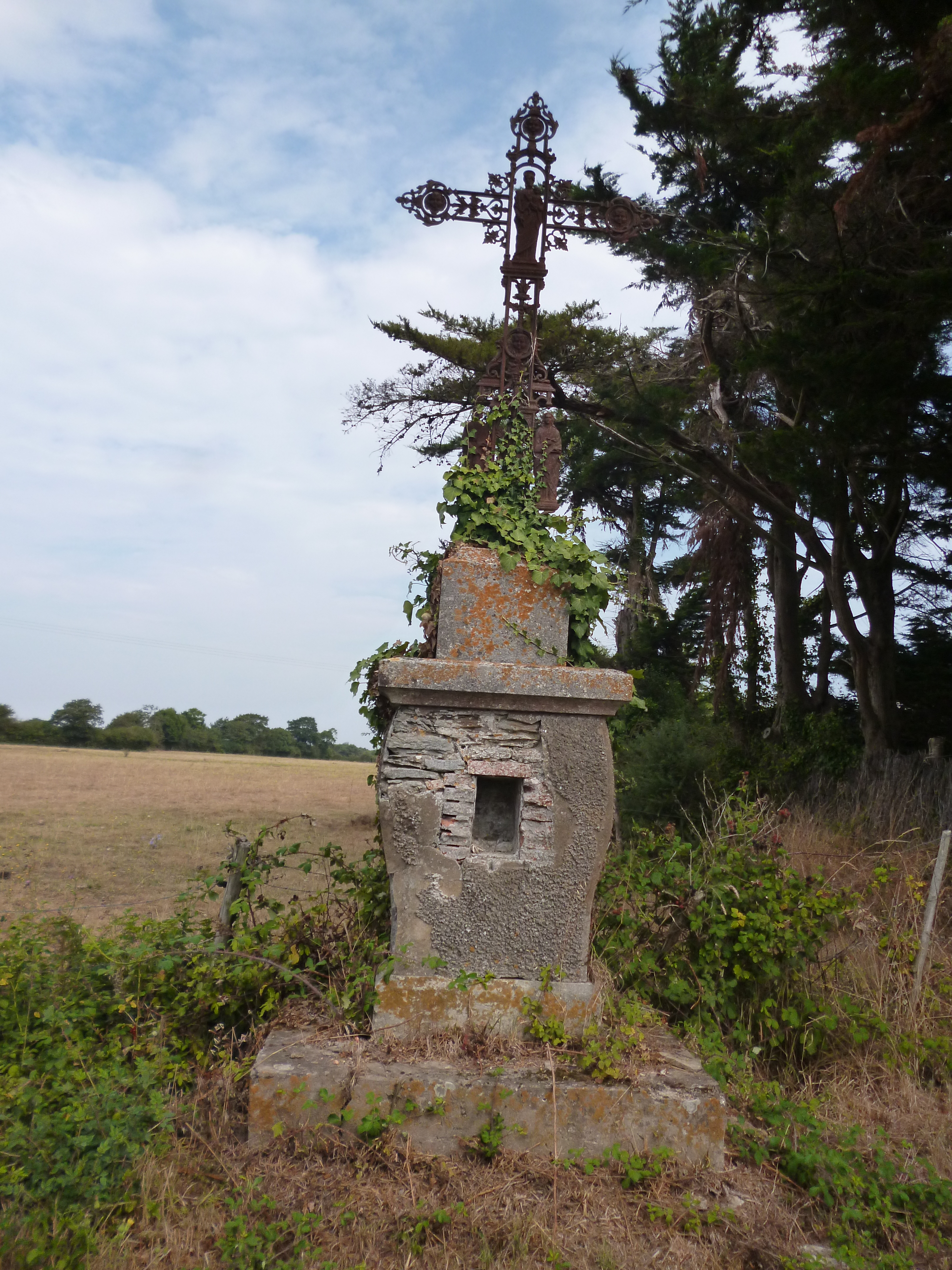

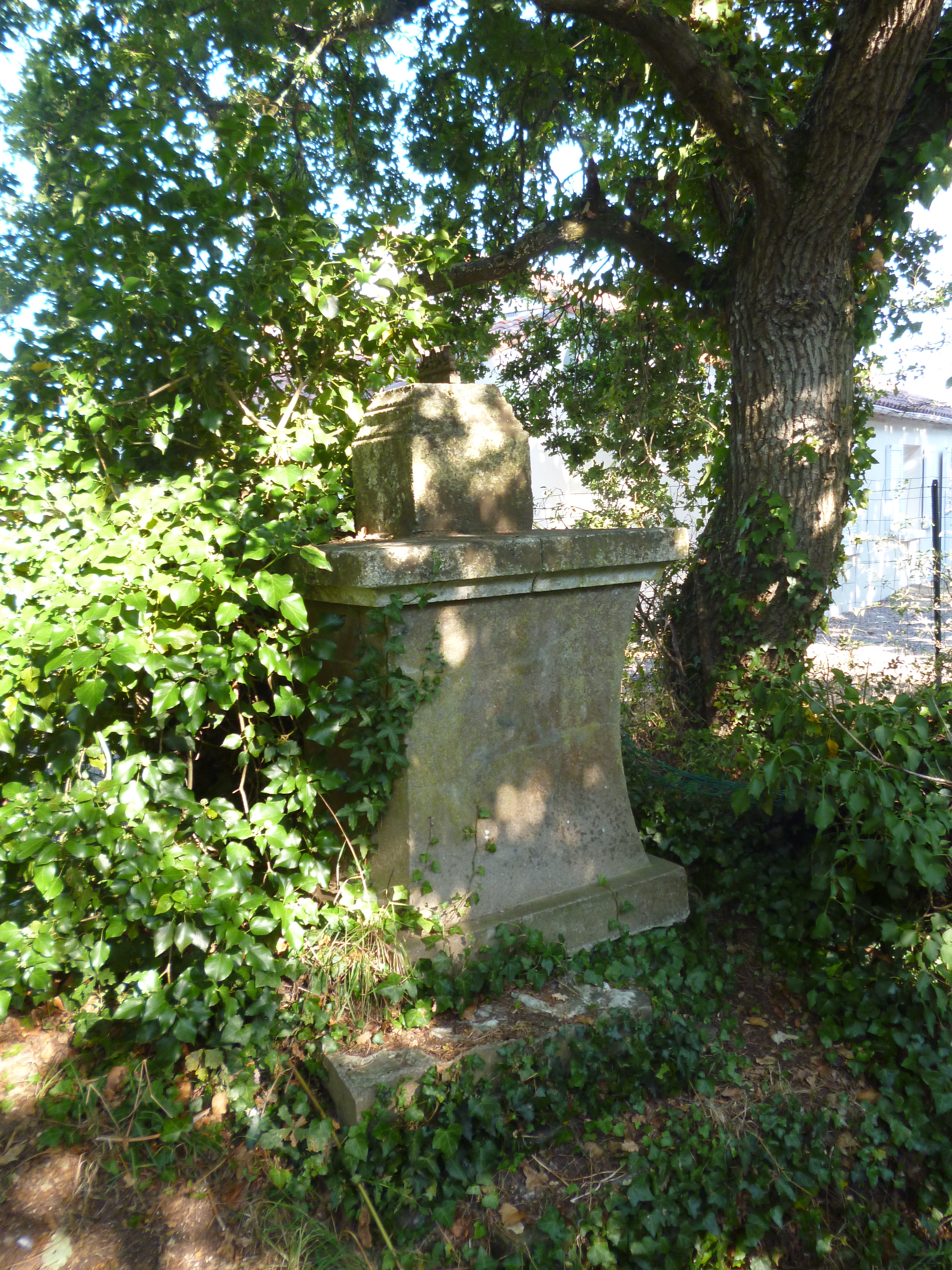

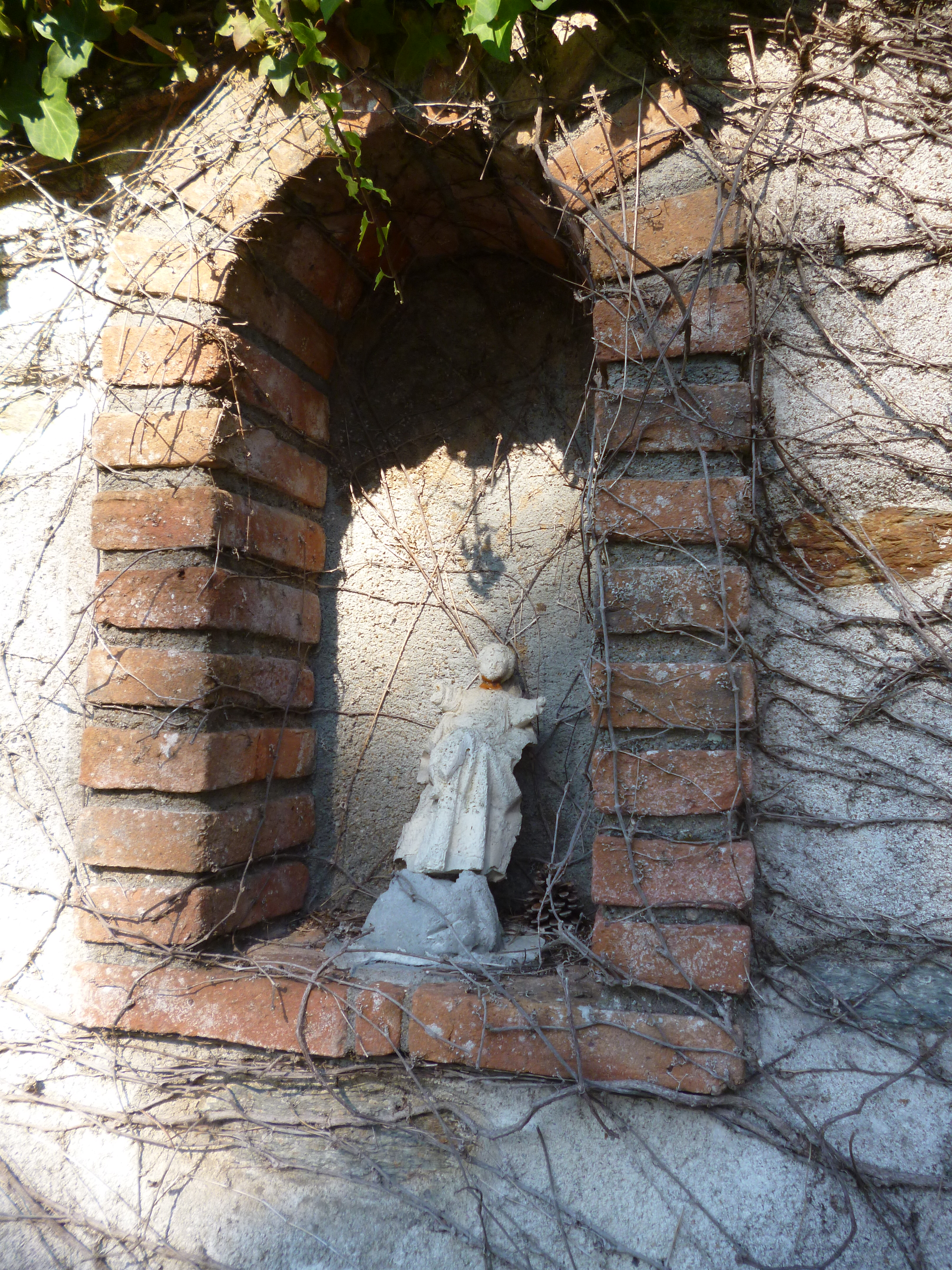
- Seaside follies and beautiful seafront residences at Tharon-Plage.
- Saint-Michel du Redois, Comberge and Tharon beaches, dominated by schist cliffs and ancient wooded dunes.
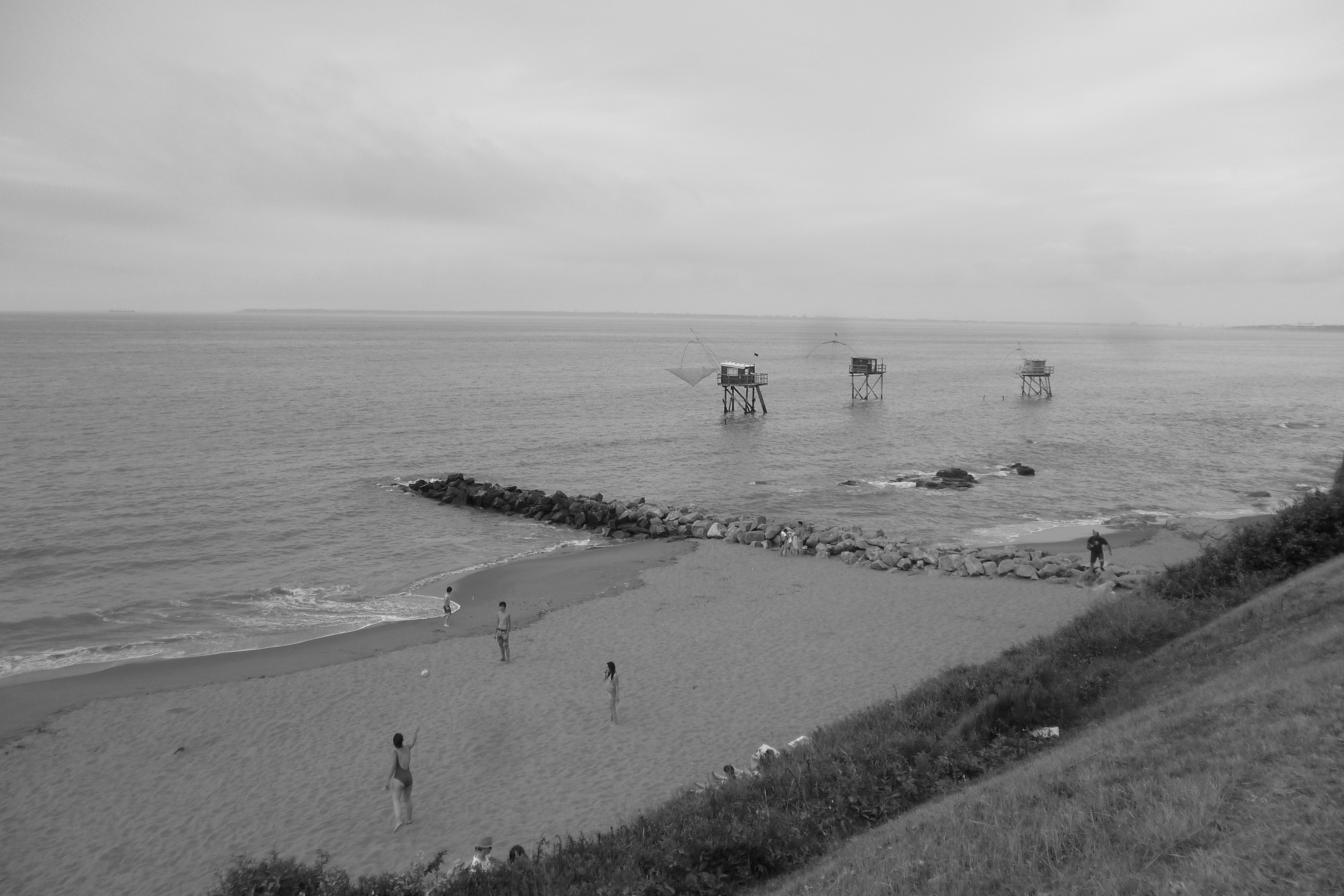
Plage de Comberge et pêcheries.

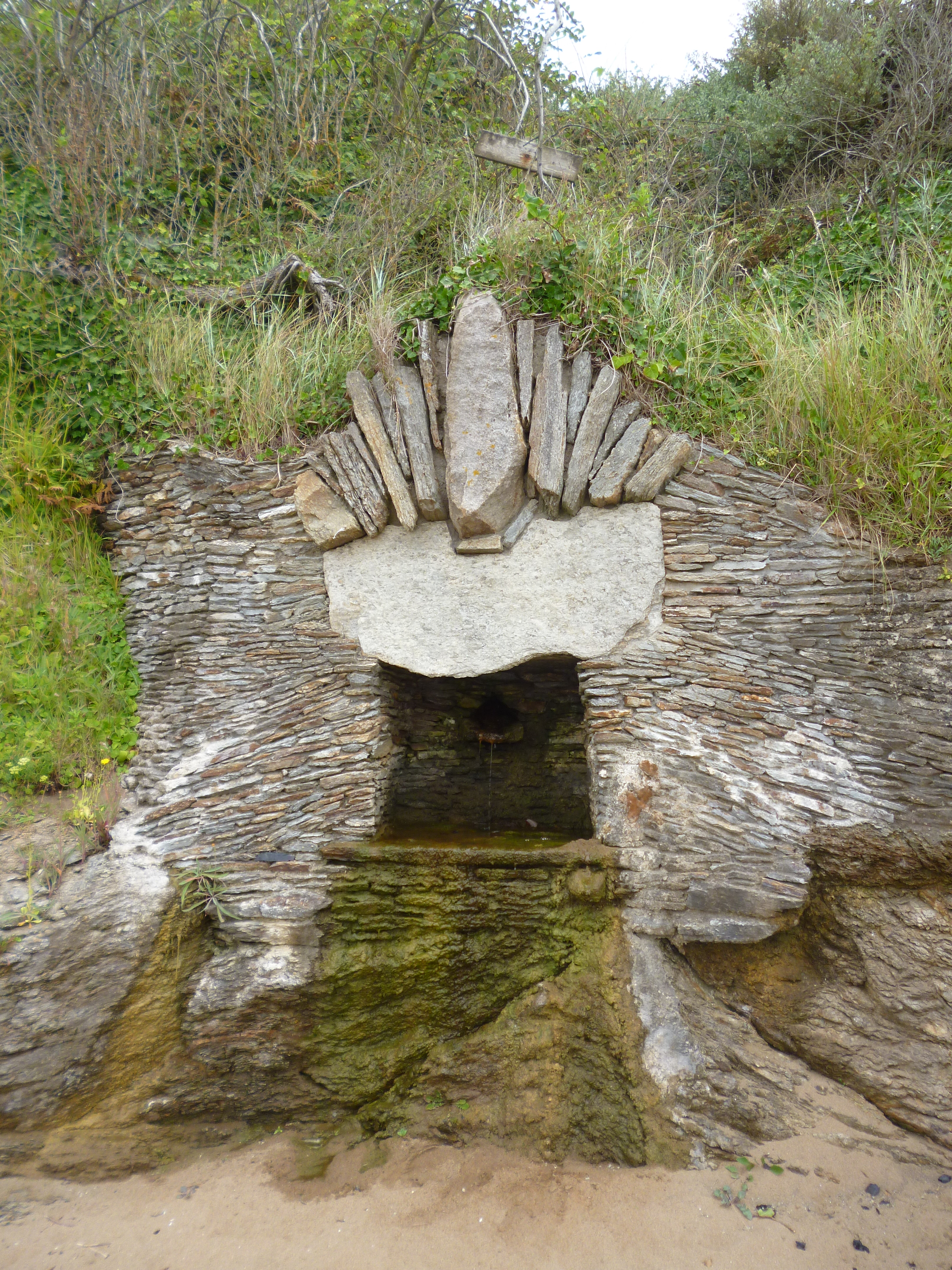
Embouchure d'un petit cours d'eau, plage de Comberge.
- The vast Gatineaux pond is ideal for fishing.
- Comberge harbor, accessible only at high tide.
- Bois Roy park
- Tallureau wood
- Town hall, administrative buildings
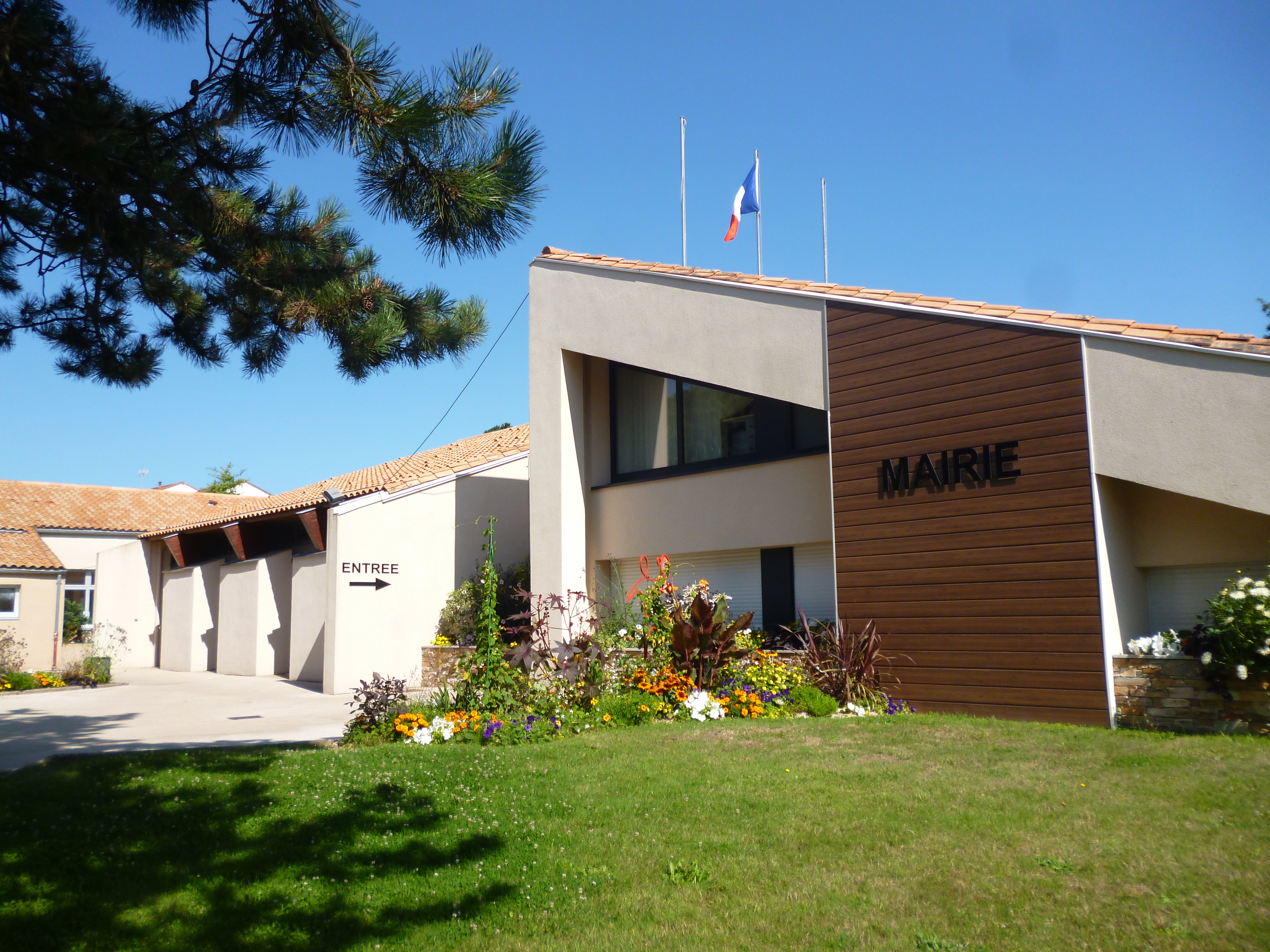
Town hall.

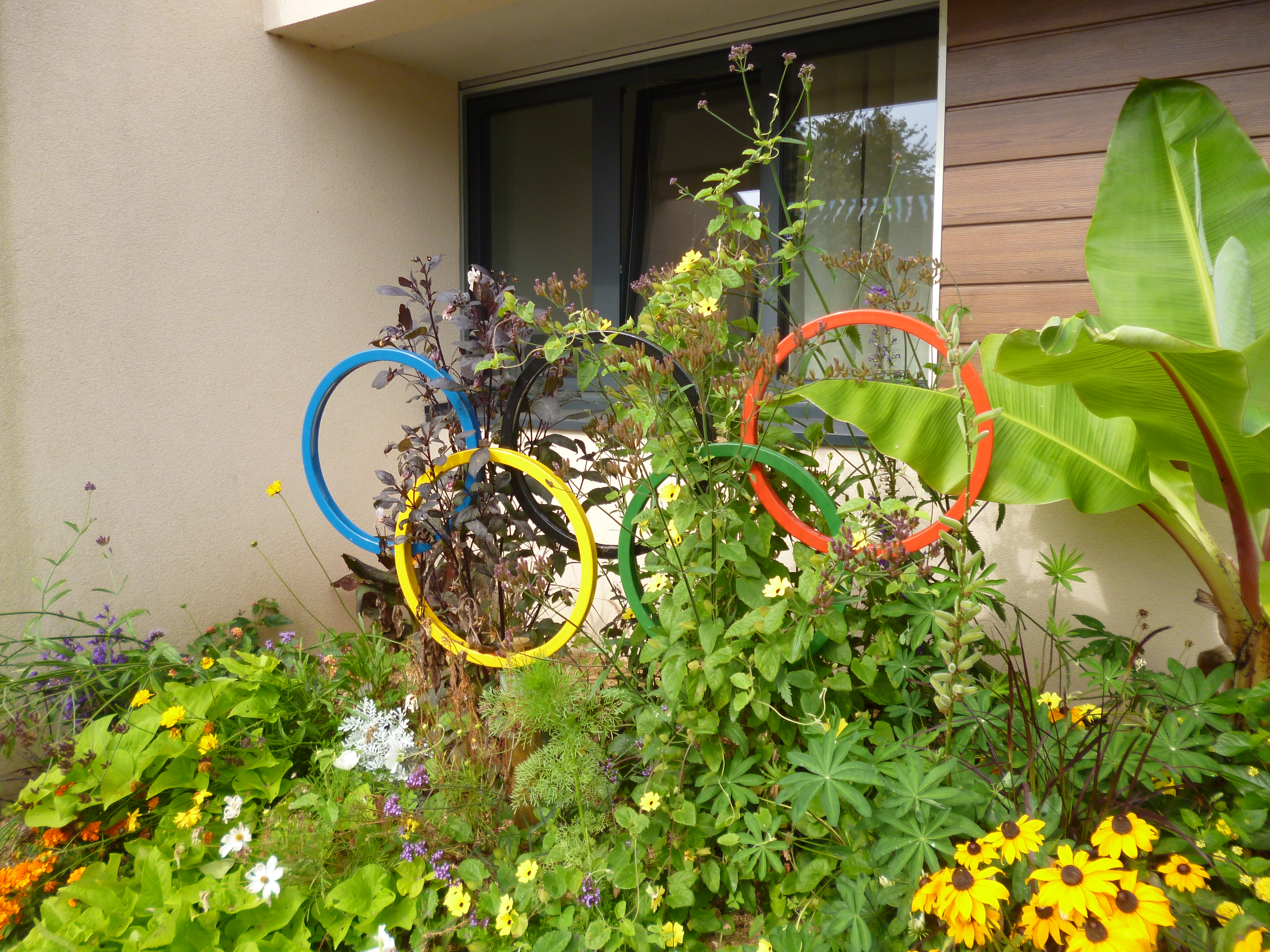
Olympic rings next to the townhall during the 2016 summer Olympics in Rio de Janeiro.

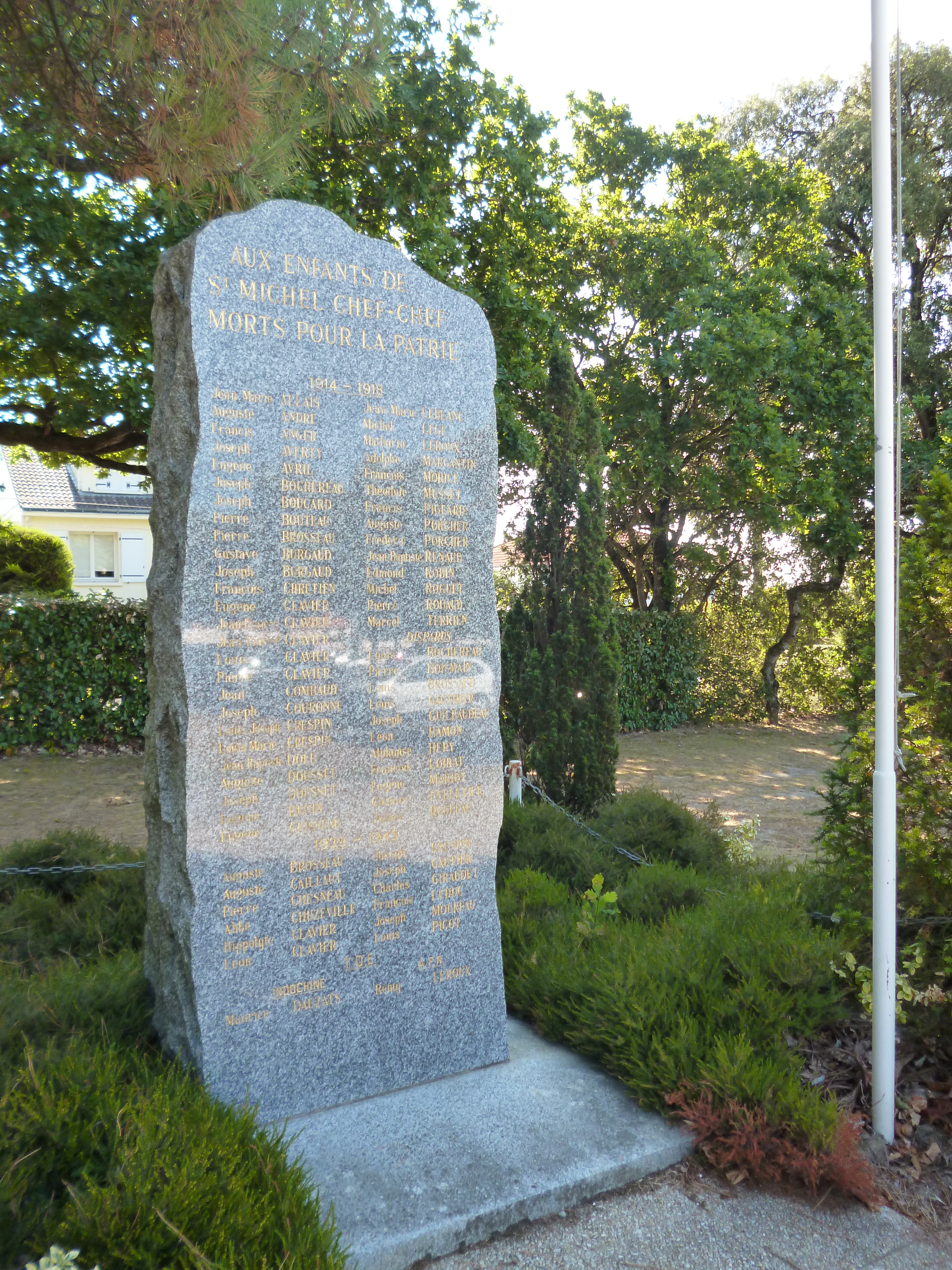
War memorial

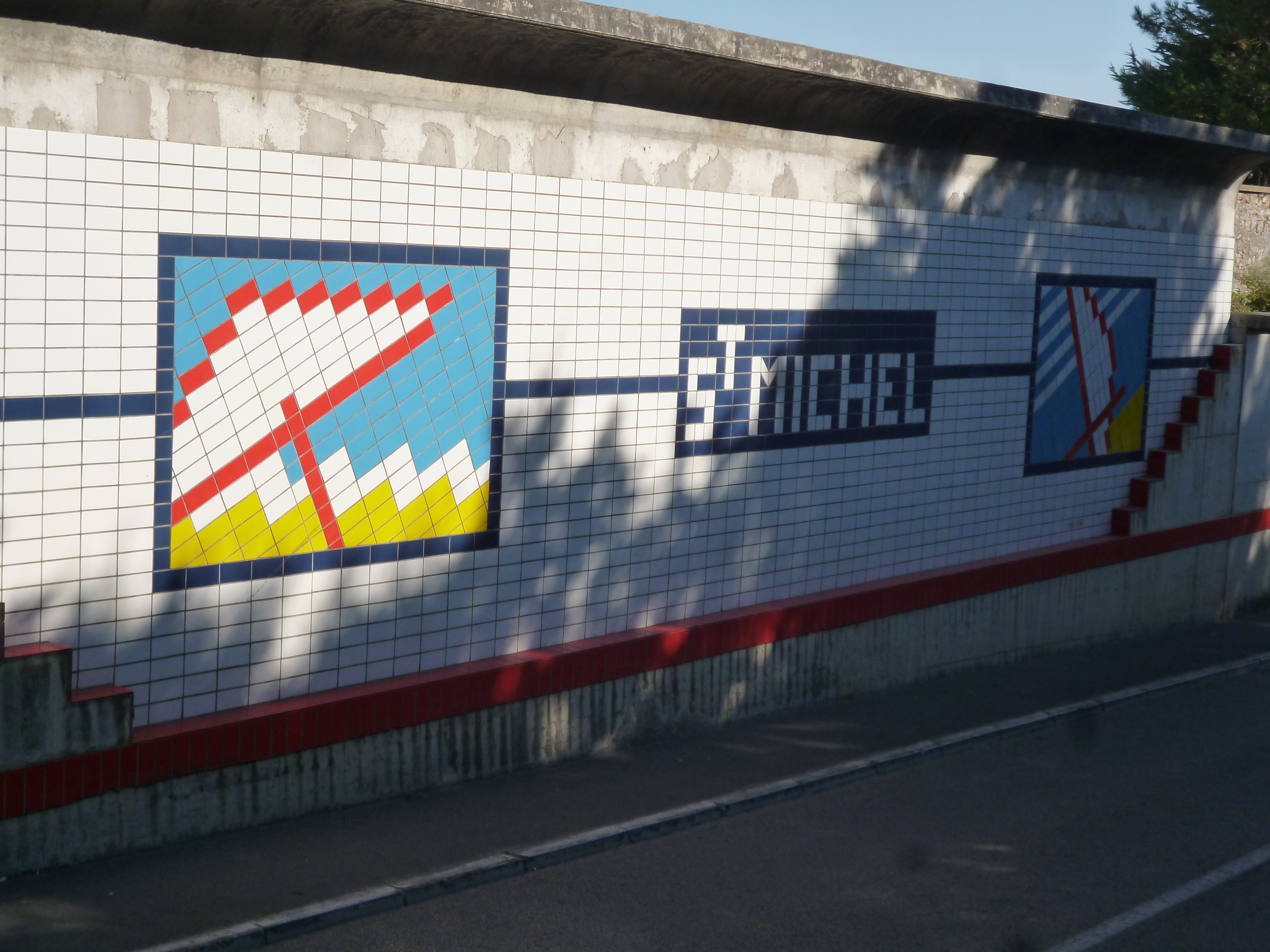
Mosaic at the entrance to the town, on the D78 road.

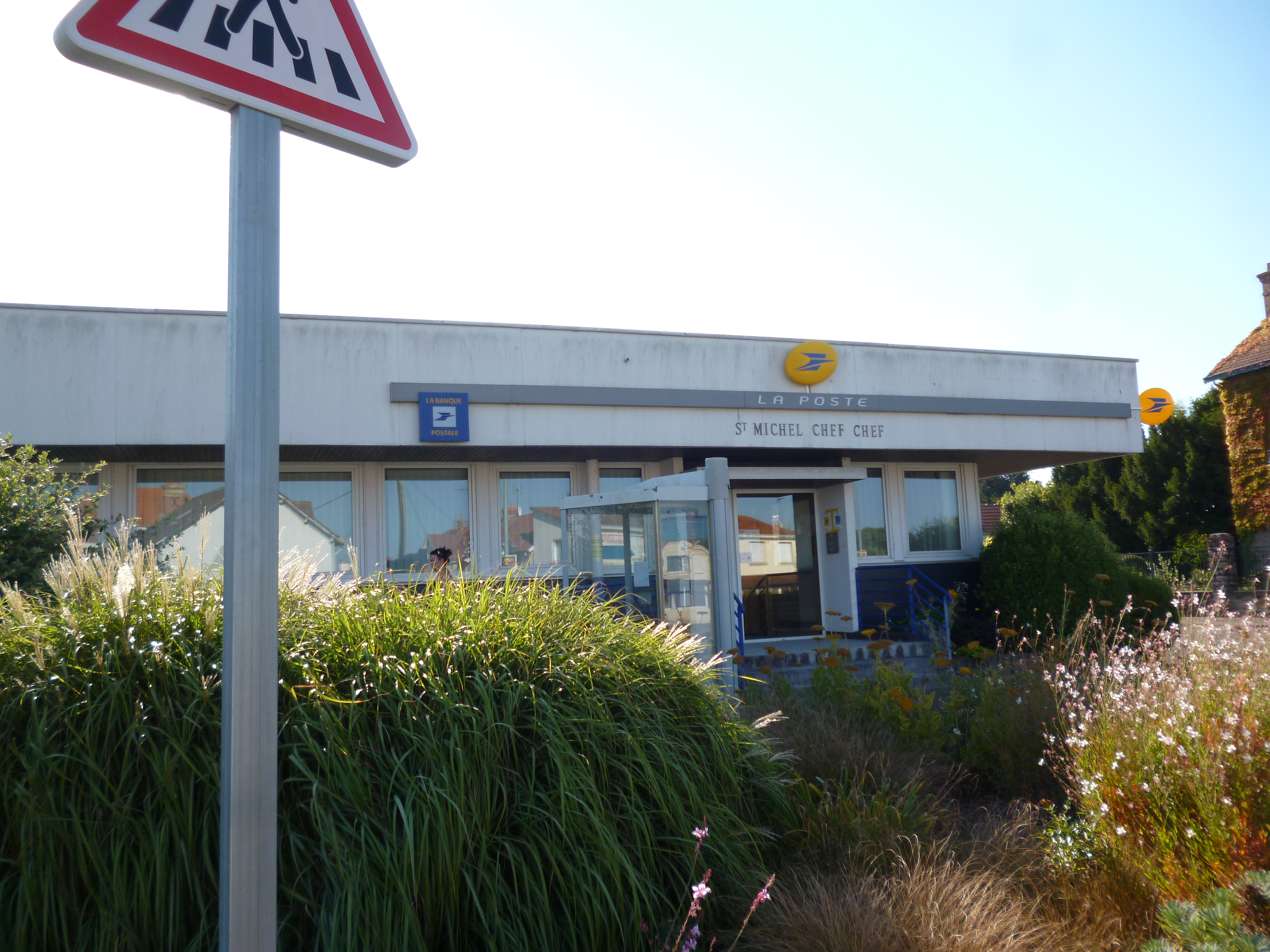
Post Office.

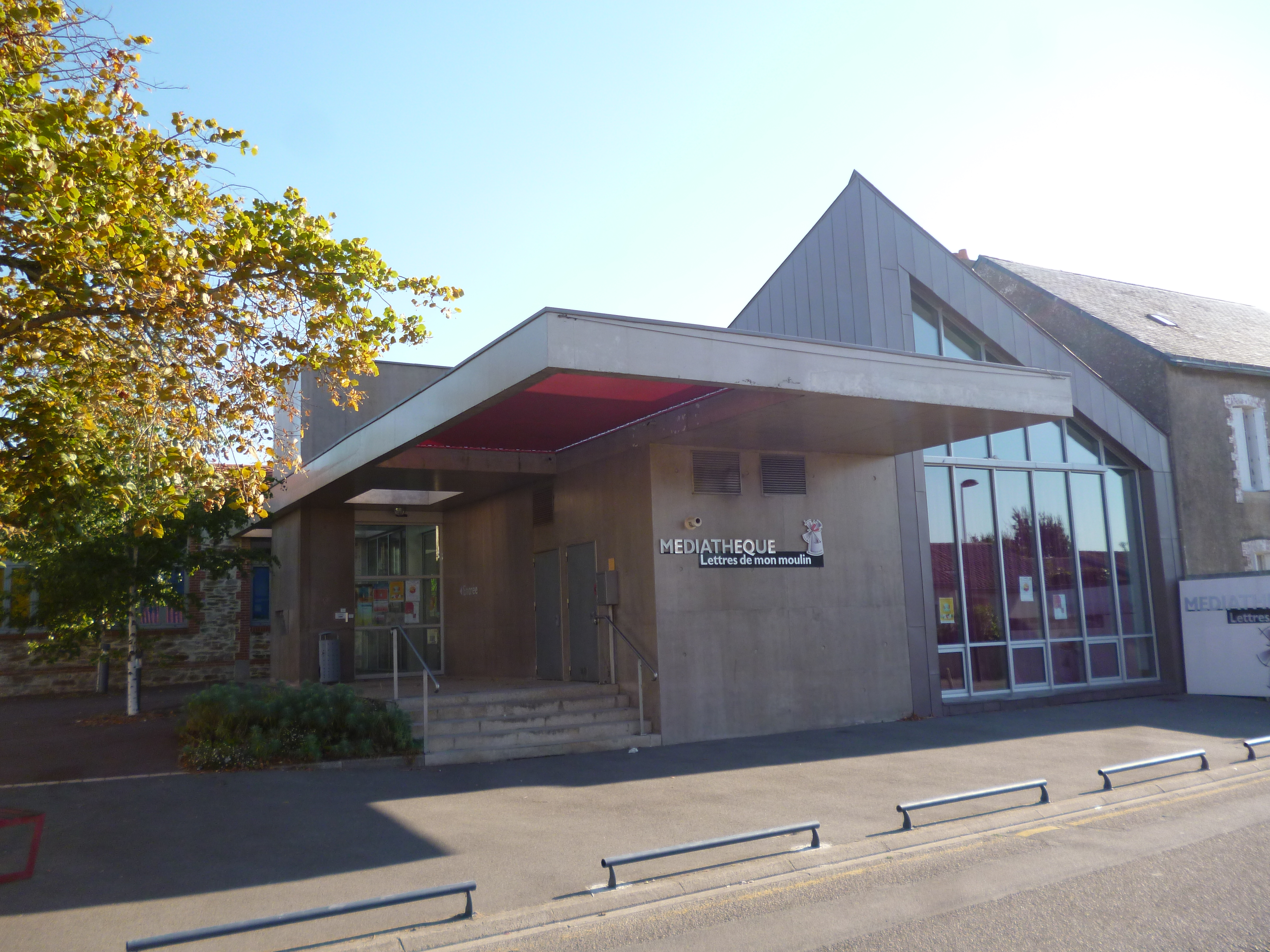
Library Lettres-de-mon-moulin.

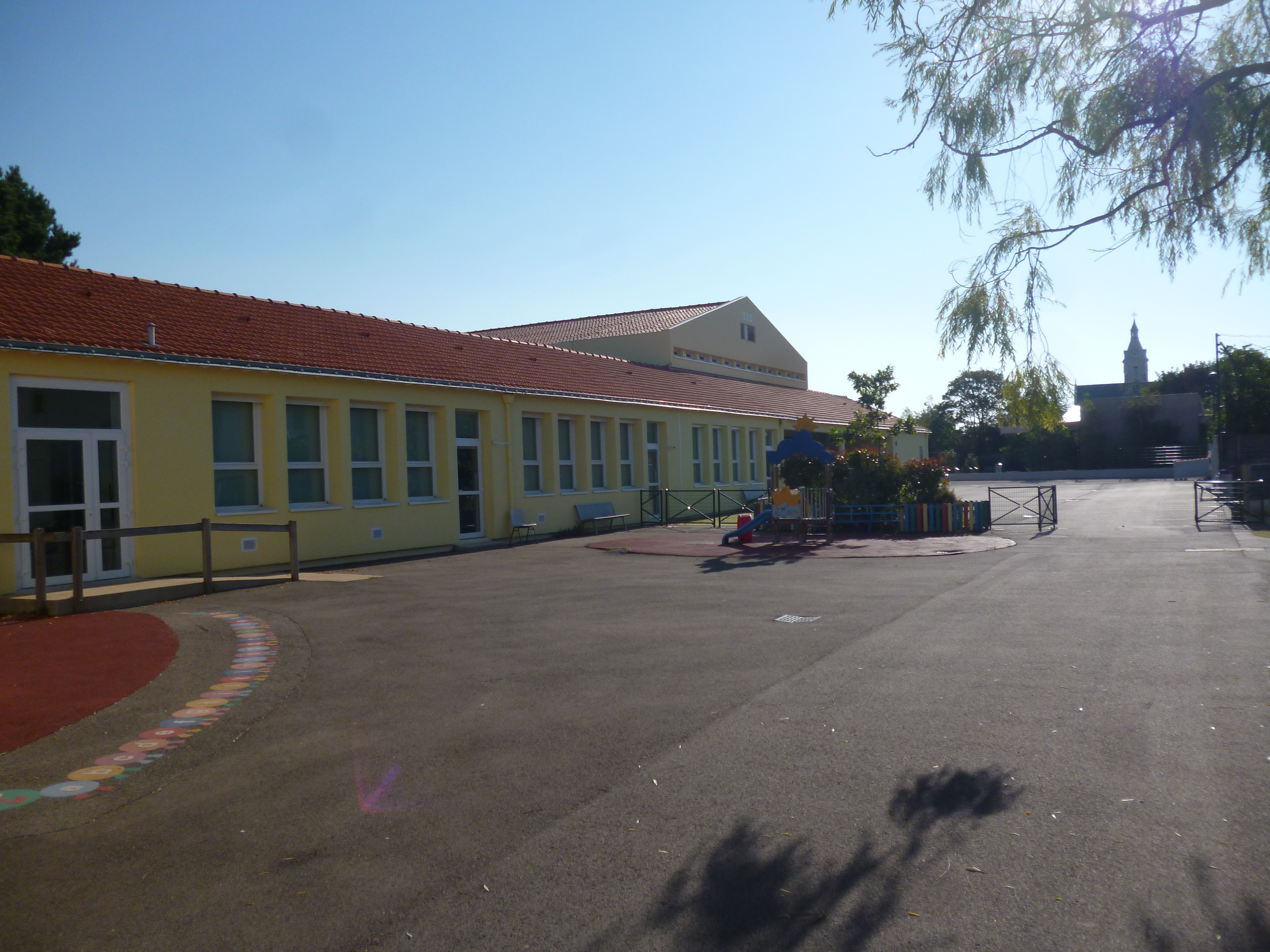
L'Horizon public primary school.

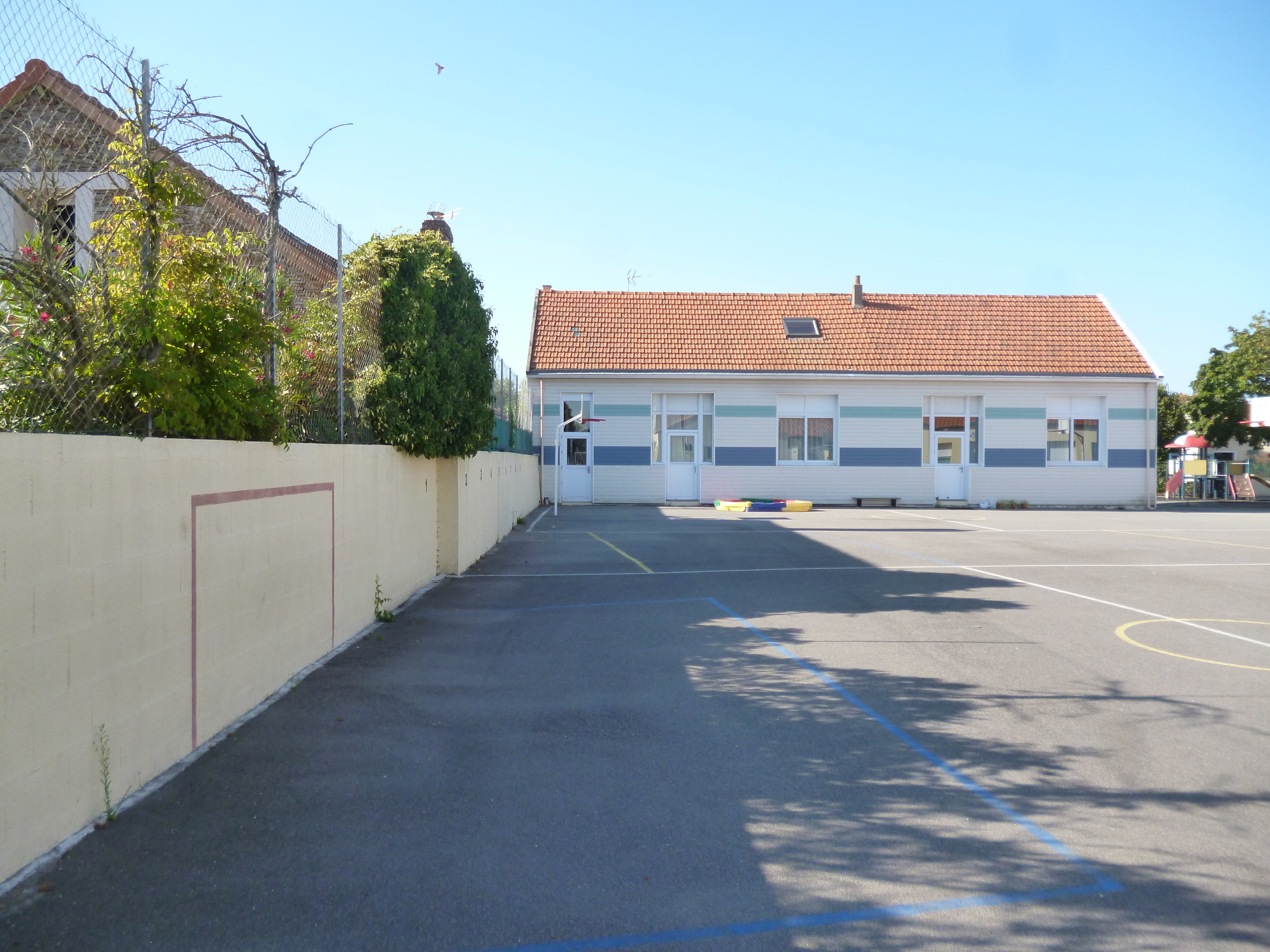
Sainte-Bernadette private primary school

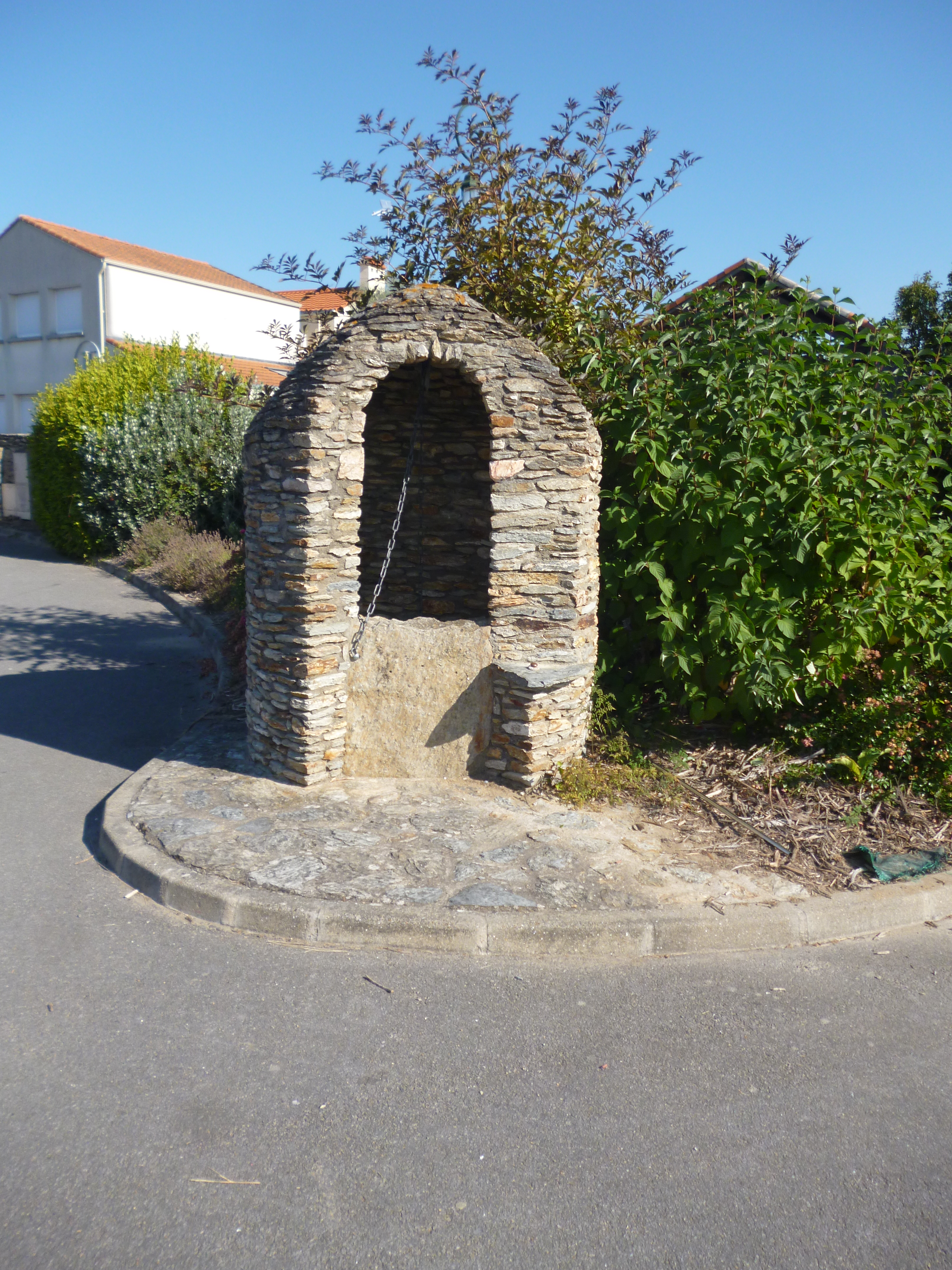
Old well.

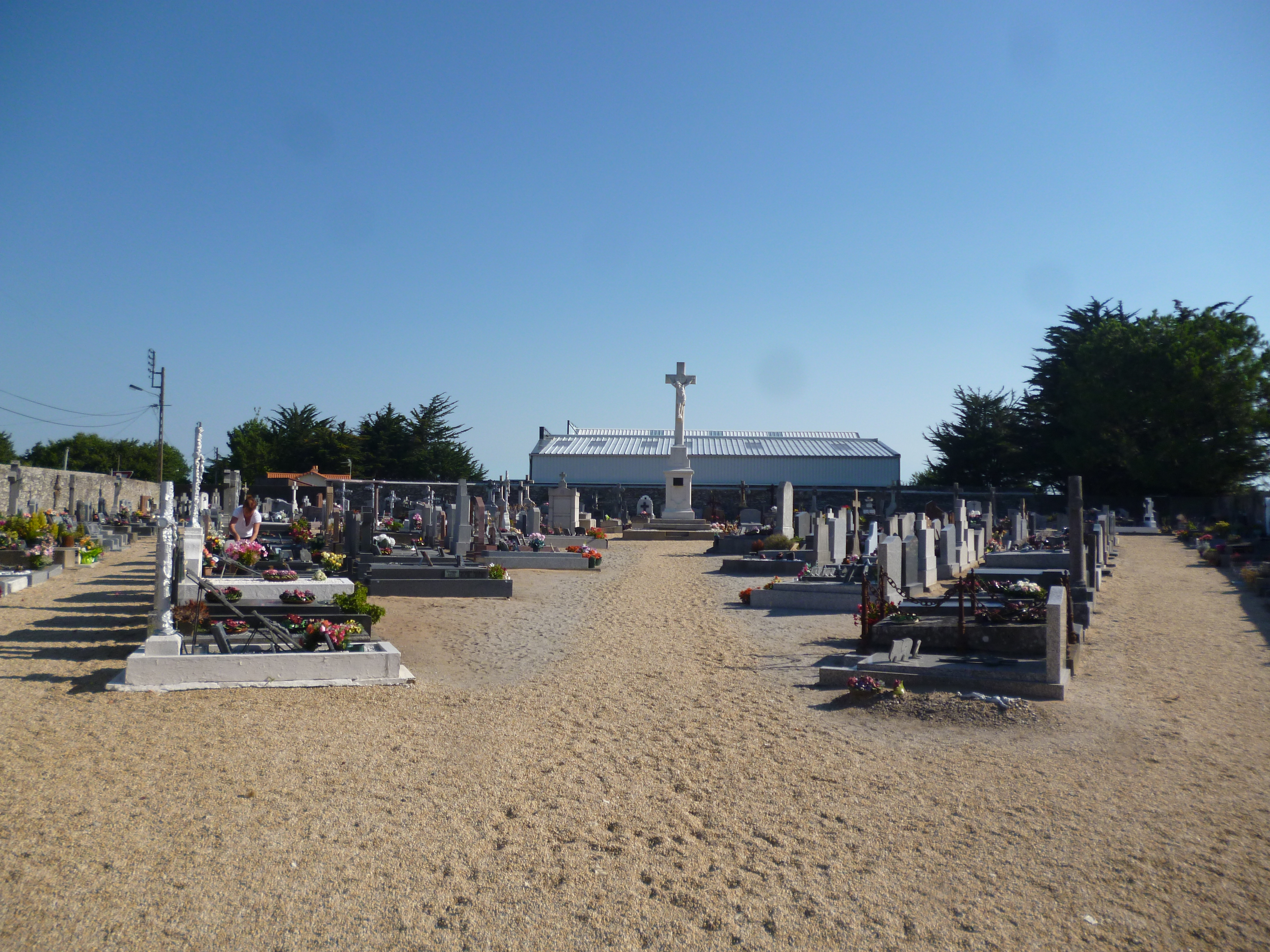
Cemetery and calvary

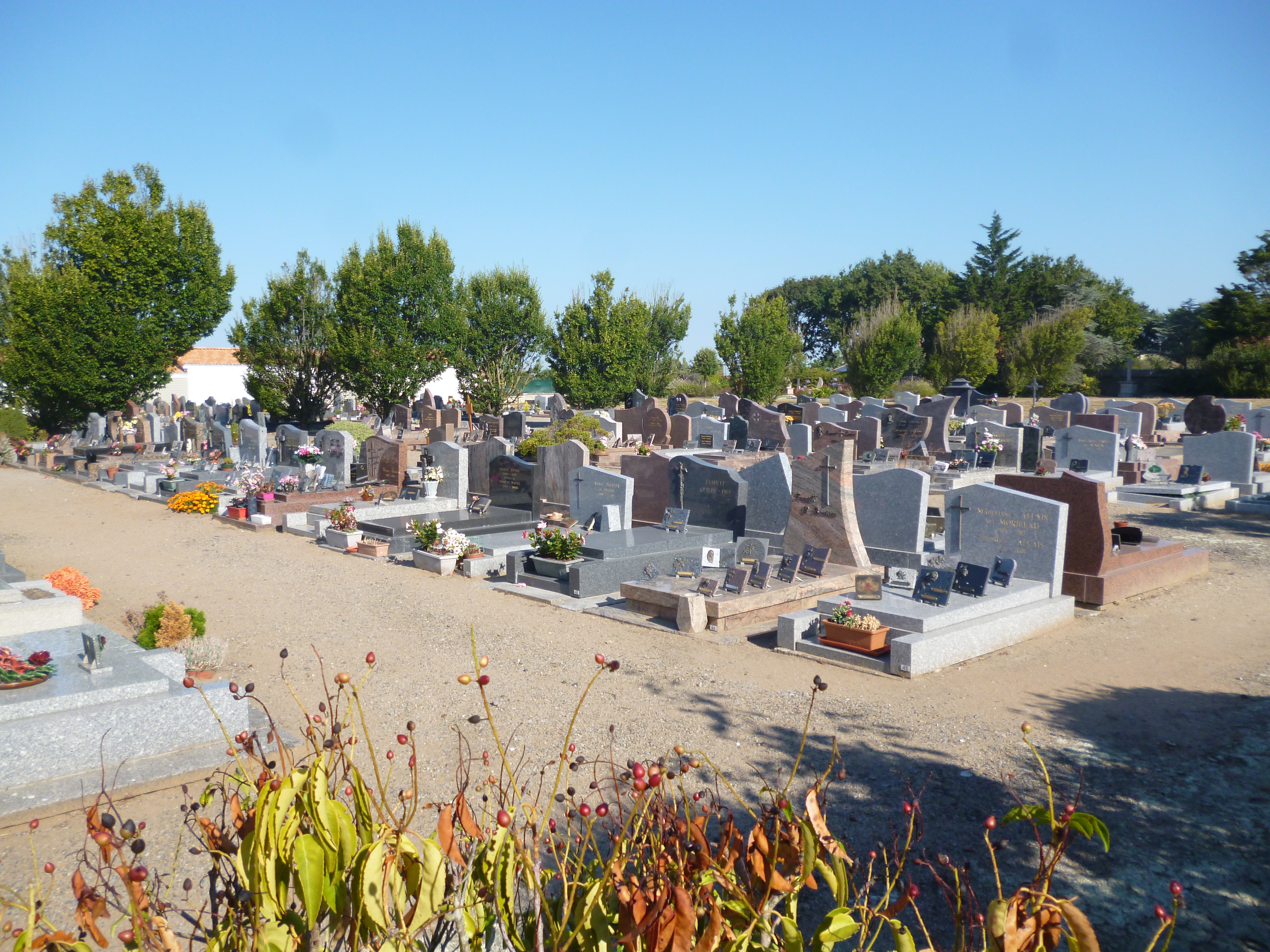
Cemetery

== See also ==
- Communes of the Loire-Atlantique department
