= 1945 French legislative election in Dahomey and Togo =

Elections to the French National Assembly were held in French Dahomey and French Togoland on 21 October 1945. The territory elected two seats to the Assembly via two electoral colleges. French missionary Francis Aupiais of the Popular Republican Movement was elected from the first college and Sourou-Migan Apithy in the second, but Aupiais died before taking office.

== Background ==
Some residents of French Togoland opposed attempts to entrench French rule by allowing elections to the French National Assembly in what was a League of Nations mandate rather than a French colony. Petitions against French policy were sent to the United Nations by the Ewe, who sought to be reunited with their brethren in British Togoland.

== Campaign ==
Despite having left Dahomey seventeen years before the elections, Aupiais remained a popular figure in Dahomey, even amongst animists. His former pupil Sourou-Migan Apithy benefitted from his association with Aupiais, although he had also become an important figure in his own right through his work on the Monnerville Commission, which had reported on the future of the French colonies.

== Results ==
=== First College ===
Candidate	Party	First round		Second round	
Candidate	Party	Votes	%	Votes	%
Francis Aupiais	Popular Republican Movement	523	50.00	599	54.65
Robert Agier		253	24.19	497	45.35
Bourgeois		116	11.09		
Bourjac		84	8.03		
Appert	UDSR	70	6.69		
Total		1,046	100.00	1,096	100.00
Valid votes		1,046	97.94	1,096	99.37
Invalid/blank votes		22	2.06	7	0.63
Total votes		1,068	100.00	1,103	100.00
Registered voters/turnout		1,274	83.83	1,279	86.24
Source: De Benoist

=== Second College ===
Candidate	Votes	%
Sourou-Migan Apithy	6,600	76.42
Casimir d'Almeida	643	7.44
Robert Sanvée	548	6.34
Hyacinthe da Silva	241	2.79
Sylvestre Kponton	193	2.23
Antonio d'Almeida	175	2.03
Paulin Norward	135	1.56
Louis Ignacio-Pinto	102	1.18
Total	8,637	100.00
Valid votes	8,637	95.36
Invalid/blank votes	420	4.64
Total votes	9,057	100.00
Registered voters/turnout	11,599	78.08
Source: De Benoist

== Aftermath ==
Following the elections, Senegalese MP Lamine Guèye attempted to persuade all the African MPs to form an African Bloc, which would be affiliated with the SFIO. Although the attempt failed, Apithy did sit with the SFIO.
