= Francis Aupiais =

French politician

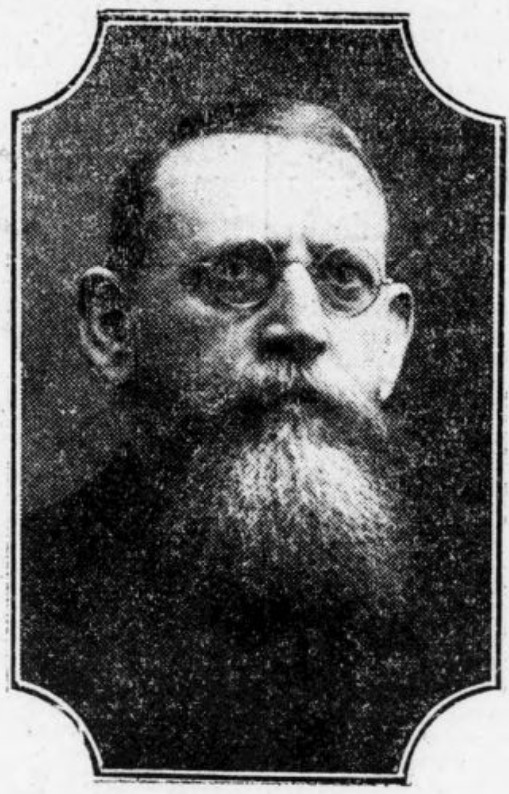
Francis Aupiais

Francis Aupiais (11 August 1877 – 14 December 1945) was a French Roman Catholic missionary, anthropologist, and writer.

He was born in Saint-Père-en-Retz and studied at the Missions Africains de Lyon seminary. He was ordained a priest in 1902. He briefly worked in Senegal before being sent to Dahomey. In 1903, he was named vicar of Abomey, and soon took on several other administrative roles in Porto-Novo. Aupiais was reassigned to Dakar from 1915 to 1918. At the end of World War I, he returned to Dahomey and served as director of mission schools. Aupiais was an important religious figure and helped advance the careers of Paul Hazoumé and Sourou-Migan Apithy. In 1925, Aupiais founded the journal La Reconnaissance Africaine, striving to publish ethnographic studies by Dahomeyans and popularize African culture abroad. He was a strident admirer of the indigenous culture and integrated traditional music, costumes and dances into religious celebrations.

In 1926, he returned to Paris and sought to end forced labor in the colonies and joined the executive committee of the annual Louvain Missiology Week. Aupiais studied at the newly opened Institute of Ethnology in Paris from 1926 to 1928. That year, he became Provincial of the Lyon Province SMA, serving until 1931. Between 1929 and 1930 he produced two films, one a documentary on Catholic mission efforts in Dahomey, Le Dahomey Chrétien, the other an ethnographic film of traditional religious ceremonies, Le Dahomey religieux, which was censored in 1931. In 1938, he published Le Missionnaire, an overview of his colonial life and work in Africa. The following year, his ethnological work led to him being admitted to the Academy of Colonial Sciences. Although he lived in France during this period, he frequently travelled to Porto-Novo. On 18 October 1945, he was elected to serve as the first representative from Dahomey in the French Assembly, together with Apithy. However, he fell ill and died on 14 December 1945 in France, never joining parliament. He was succeeded by fellow missionary Pierre Bertho.
