= Saint-Père-en-Retz =

- Commune
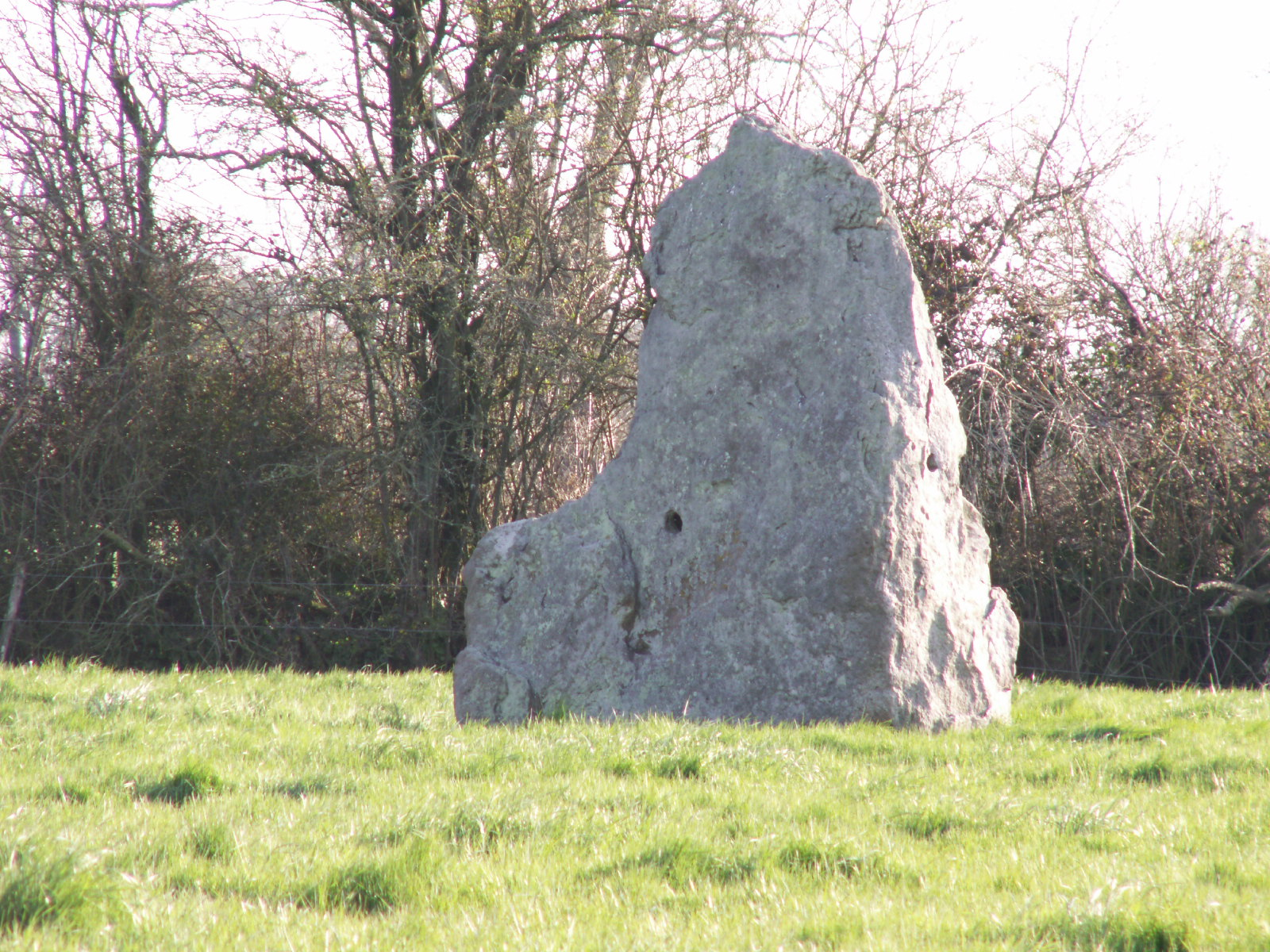
- The menhir of Riverais

- Coat of arms
- Location of Saint-Père-en-Retz
- Location within France Location within Pays de la Loire
- Coordinates: 47°12′28″N 2°02′37″W
- Country: France
- Region: Pays de la Loire
- Department: Loire-Atlantique
- Arrondissement: Saint-Nazaire
- Canton: Saint-Brevin-les-Pins
- Intercommunality: Sud-Estuaire

Government
  - Mayor (2020–2026): Jean-Pierre Audelin
- Area^{1}: 62.72 km^{2} (24.22 sq mi)
- Elevation: 14 m (46 ft)
- Highest elevation: 62 m (203 ft)
- Lowest elevation: 0 m (0 ft)
- Population (2023): 4,894
  - Density: 78.03/km^{2} (202.1/sq mi)
- Time zone: UTC+01:00 (CET)
  - Summer (DST): UTC+02:00 (CEST)
- INSEE/Postal code: 44187 /44320
- ^{1} French Land Register data, which excludes lakes, ponds, glaciers > 1 km^{2} (0.386 sq mi or 247 acres) and river estuaries.

Saint-Père-en-Retz (French pronunciation: [sɛ̃ pɛʁ ɑ̃ ʁɛ], literally Saint-Père in Retz; Breton: Sant-Pêr-Raez) is a commune in the Loire-Atlantique department in western France.

== Population ==
Historical population
Year	Pop.	±% p.a.
1968	2,682	—
1975	2,627	−0.30%
1982	2,917	+1.51%
1990	3,250	+1.36%
1999	3,454	+0.68%
2007	3,933	+1.64%
2012	4,197	+1.31%
2017	4,564	+1.69%
2023	4,894	+1.17%
Source: INSEE

== Notable people ==
- Francis Aupiais(1877-1945), missionary and ethnographer in Africa

== See also ==
- Communes of the Loire-Atlantique department
