= Haute Perche Canal =

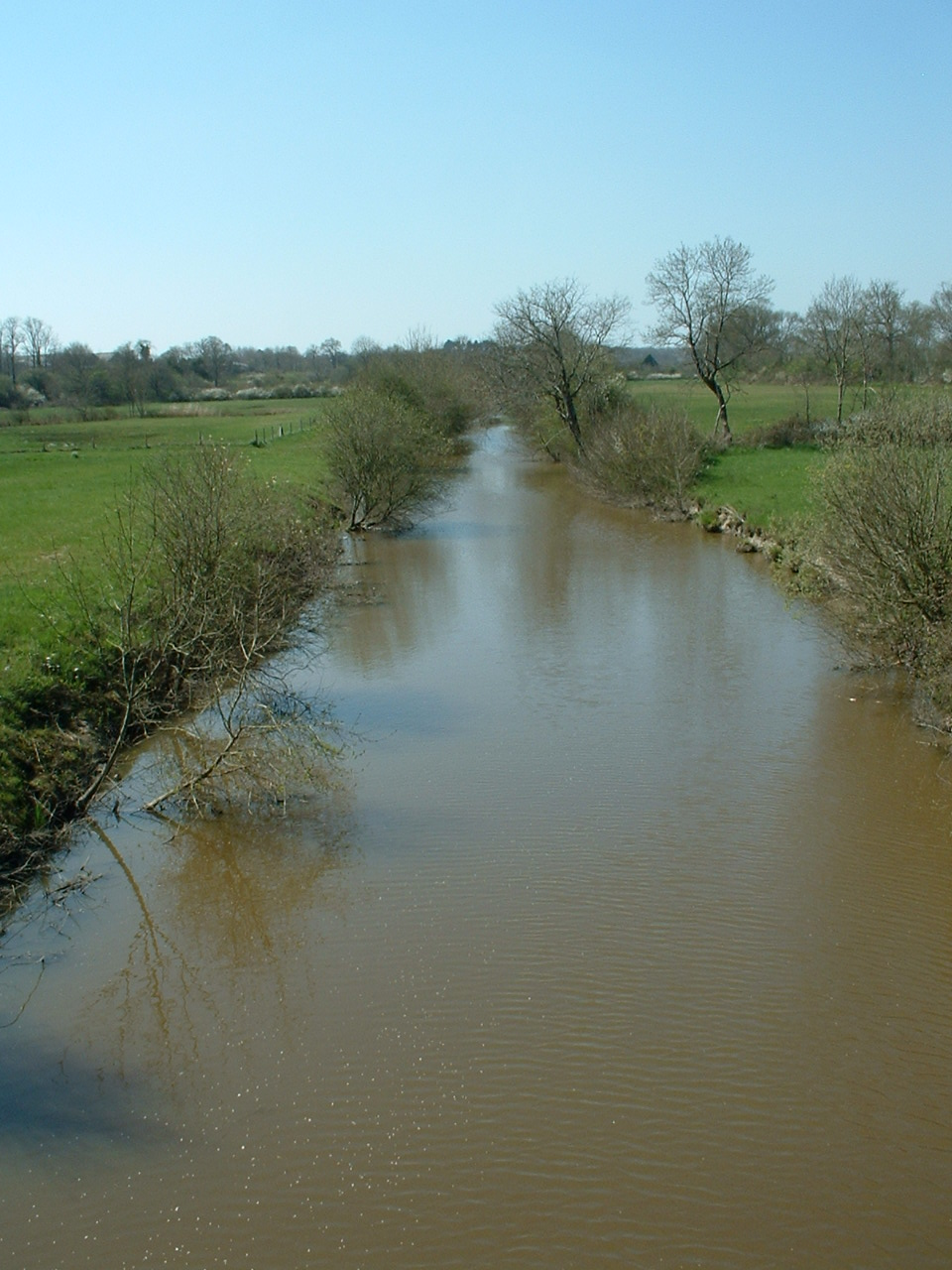
- The Canal de Haute Perche at Chauvé, above the Pont du Clion.

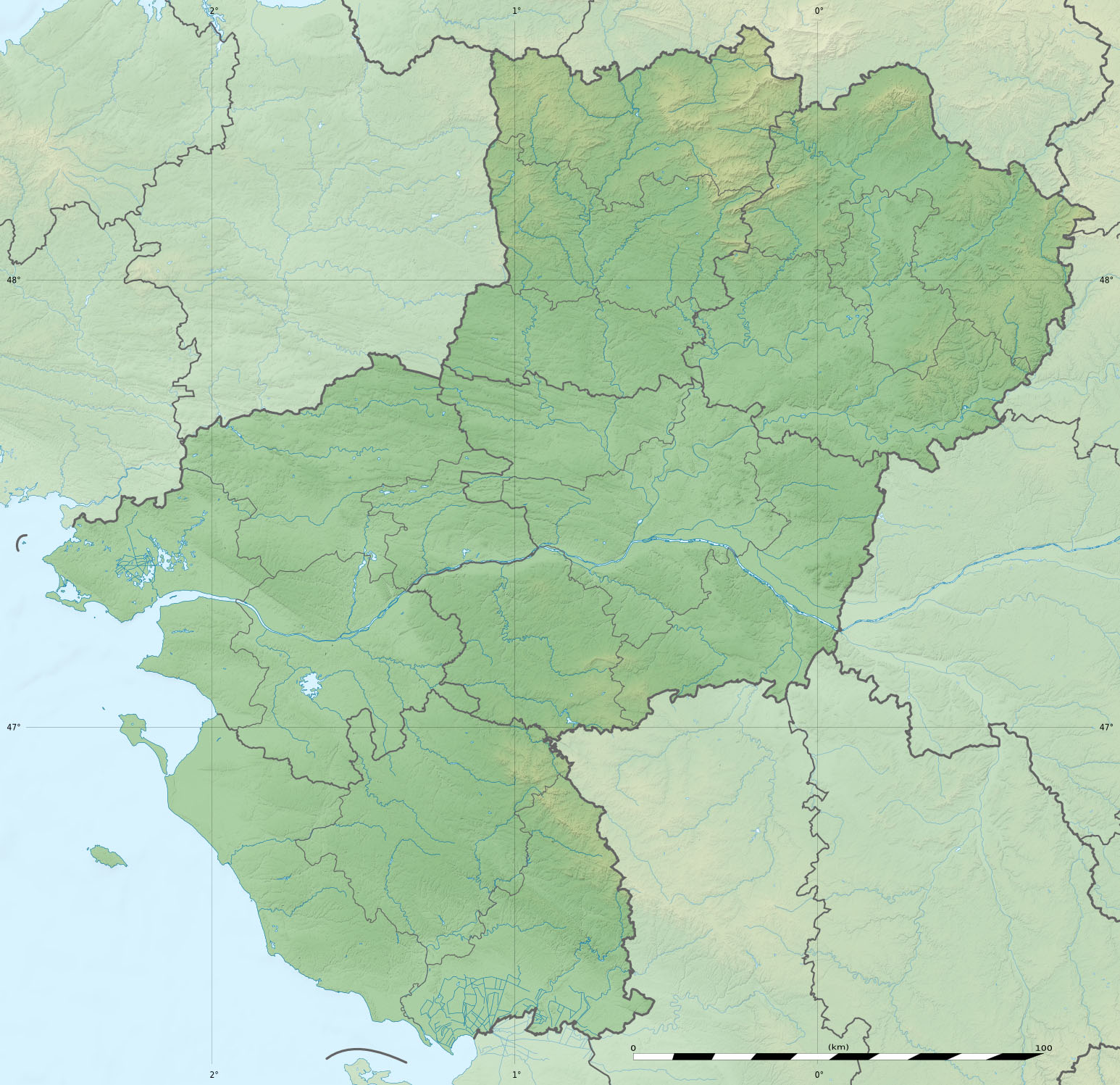
- Location within France Location within Pays de la Loire
- Native name: Canal de Haute Perche (French)

Location
- Country: France
- Department: Loire-Atlantique
- Arrondissement: Nantes

Physical characteristics
- Source
  - location: Chaumes-en-Retz
  - coordinates: 47.1653°N 1.9411°W
  - elevation: 41,71m
- Mouth
  - location: Pornic : Baie de Bourgneuf, Bay of Biscay, Atlantic Ocean
  - coordinates: 47.1152°N 2.0988°W
  - elevation: 0m
- Length: 17 kilometres (11 mi)
- Basin size: 137 square kilometres (53 mi^{2})

Basin features
- Tributaries
  - left: Ruisseau du Pontereau, Ruisseau du Port, le Gué
  - right: Ruisseau du Pin, Ruisseau de la Rinais, Ruisseau du Val Saint-Martin

The Haute Perche Canal (French: Canal de Haute Perche [kanal də ot pɛʁʃ]; Breton: Kanol ar Perche Uhel), despite its title, is a natural river, the Rivière de Haute-Perche, that has been slightly canalised to improve navigation between its mouth in the Bay of Bourgneuf at the port town of Pornic and the upstream settlements of Le Clion-sur-Mer, Chauvé and Arthon-en-Retz. It is located in the Pays de Retz in the Loire-Atlantique department and the Pays de la Loire region. It has also been known as the Canal de Pornic since the 16th century and was sometimes called the Étier de Haute Perche. Historically, it was called the Rouet, after the wheels of the water mills in the port.

== Etymology ==
The Haute Perche is a village on the waterway between the towns of Arthon and Chauvé in the commune of Chaumes-en-Retz and was at times the navigable limit of the waterway.

== Geography ==
The Canal de Haute Perche is located entirely in the Pays de Retz, south of the Loire in Loire-Atlantique. It extends over the municipalities of Pornic, Clion-sur-Mer, Chauvé and Chaumes-en-Retz.

== Hydrography ==
The Haute Perche Canal drainage basin extends east of Pornic over 137 square kilometres (13,700 ha) and with its component tributaries totals 107.7 kilometres (66.9 mi) in length. It is bordered by the Boivre basin to the north. To the east the basin of the Blanche links to the complex of rivers and canals associated with the Lac de Grand-Lieu: (Acheneau and Tenu) and those of the Marais Breton (the Marais de Millac and the Falleron) to the south. The river has its source in the commune of Chaumes-en-Retz (delegated commune of Arthon-en-Retz ) and it flows towards the west, emptying into the Bay of Bourgneuf at Pornic. It is one of the main sources of fresh water in the bay with the Falleron.

Basin of the Canal de Haute-Perche in 1866 from the Carte d'état-major

=== Ria ===
The mouth of the river is a ria (or Breton: aber), eroded along a fault line in the Precambrian mica-schist rocks of the Armorican Massif which define the north coast of the Bay of Bourgneuf. It can be considered as the southernmost aber in Brittany. Formed mainly before the Pliocene era, it was inundated by the rise in sea level due to the Flandrian transgression and has gradually silted up since. The navigable part of the river upstream from the port was considered to be 11km or 12km, but the maximum length from source to port is 17 kilometres (11 mi). The distance between the causeway of the port and the mouth of the ria at the Point de Gourmalon adds another 1.1 kilometres (0.68 mi).

=== Main tributaries ===
The course of the Canal de Haute Perche is fed by several streams whose SANDRE classification recognizes more than fifteen of 1 km or more. The banks of the canal are also connected with numerous lateral channels in the marshes. The largest tributaries on the right bank to the south include:

- The Ruisseau du Pontereau, 5km, lies to the west of Arthon and is used by a wastewater treatment plant in the town. It delimits part of the border between Pornic and Chaumes-en-Retz. Its tributary, the Ruisseau du Port, 5km, serves the village of Port to the west of Arthon (and not to be confused with the port of Pornic).
- the Gué flows from the hinterland of Bernerie-en-Retz and runs for 6 km.

The largest tributaries on the left bank to the north include:

- Ruisseau de la Basse-Chanterie, 1.45 km, south of Chauvé.
- L’étier de l’écluse, 4 km, and the Ruisseau du Pin and its tributaries extend over a vast area to the west and north of Chauvé. On its right bank stretches the le ruisseau des vieux moulins (the stream of the old mills), 5 km.
- the Rinais, spread over 10 km, is the longest of the Canal de Haute Perche tributaries. It finds its sources in the south-east of the neighbouring town and commune of Saint-Michel-Chef-Chef. In the direction of Saint-Père-en-Retz, the Rinais was also blocked between 1866 and 1950, at the confluence with the Ruisseau de la Brégeonniere, creating the lake of the Gros Caillou. It covers 450,000 square metres (45 ha).
- The Val Saint-Martin stream was blocked before 1866 and created the reservoir of the Etang du Val Saint Martin. From the sluice at the foot of the dam, it flows for 0.54 km before its confluence with the river in the ria. It covers 150,000 square metres (15 ha). Despite the installation of a fish ladder in 2012, the fish richness of the pond and stream upstream is considered poor by the local angling society: "Fishing Federation 44".

On the right bank of the ria near the mouth of the port, the Cracaud (or Cracault ) and the Dette streams flow in an arm of the ria which delimits the site of the Château de Pornic. Visible on Cassini's map, the mouth of this arm of the estuary has since silted up and most of these watercourses since buried, but the Cracault still flows visibly on the surface to the northwest of the pottery.

== Hydrology ==
In the watershed, there are stations for measuring the flow, situated both on the main watercourse and its tributaries. Some of them equip the river itself at the port, and in the ria.

=== Flow regulation ===
The sluice of the former lock at the causeway bridge in the port of Pornic is the main control point for the water level in the canal. Another sluice with three vertical check valves is located 1.25 km upstream in Boismain, near Pornic's wastewater treatment plant at Les Salettes. Operation of both of these was automated in 1987 and is controlled from Nantes, managed by Veolia Environnement for the city of Pornic. The artificial lakes of Val Saint-Martin and Gros Caillou are part of the water management control system. The Gros Caillou also serves as a drinking water reservoir.

== History ==
Human influence on the river began in the 13th century during the time of Pornic Abbey, with the construction of the causeway in 1225 which linked the two banks and formed a dam equipped with four tide mills. The causeway provided a connecting road between the two shores of the port and formed the junction of the road north to Paimboeuf and south to Machecoul. The roadway that existed before the seigneurie of René de Rais (c. 1414–1473) was still operating in 1660. The ebb and flow of the tide in the estuary was controlled to retain water to run the mills and prevent the marsh flooding during high tides. This exacerbated the siltation of the estuary and additional ditches had to be dug to facilitate drainage.

Traffic on the canal reached its peak in the 17th century with navigation inland as far the Arthon bridge. Agricultural products were transported to the port of Pornic in shallow draft barges, 'toues', which could carry up to fifty tons. Haulage was by hand. The canal also facilitated the export of timber from the Forest of Princé and the importation of fertilizer ash from Noirmoutier. The causeway from this period survived until 1854 when it was widened and rectified with the locks and canal sluices. The four watermills were dismantled at the same time. This construction separated the seawater in the port from the freshwater upstream.

The traffic on the canal decreased during the 19th century with the improvement of the roads and especially following the arrival of the railway in Pornic in 1875. Finally, a decree of 28 December 1926 struck the Canal de Haute-Perche from the classified list of navigable inland waterways or canals.

Finally, a decree from the prefect dating from 1933 considerably reduced the use of the Pornic lock: access authorisations were subsequently very restricted.

In 1944, Pornic, the river and surrounding countryside were in the Saint-Nazaire pocket. The German army blew up the lock and let the ria and marshes flood as far as Arthon in an act of passive defence of the Atlantic Wall.

=== Extension projects ===
At the end of the 18th and beginning of the 19th centuries, Alexandre de Brie-Serrant, last lord of Retz, made proposals to extend the Haute Perche canal in order to create a link with the Loire. This proposed improved navigation to avoid the dangerous sandbanks between Nantes and the Loire estuary and offered a more direct route to the Bay of Biscay. The proposed route of the new canal towards Nantes would have continued from the Haute Perche bridge in the northeast to join the Blanche, through the Forest of Princé to follow the course of the Blanche then cutting eastwards from the Acheneau south of Cheix-en-Retz to join the Loire at Indret. Despite initial government support in 1786, his proposals were rejected. After the Revolution, Brie-Serrant relaunched his proposal but, again, did not receive the necessary support for his ambitious projects.

The Haute Perche canal was also proposed as a drainage route for a project to drain the Grand-Lieu lake in 1806, but was excluded because the course was more than double that of the Acheneau.

== Environment ==
The river basin and especially the freshwater marshes of Arthon, are part of the protection zone of Bourgneuf bay. An environmental and ecological improvement program within the basin was initiated in 2018 by Pornic Agglo Pays de Retz. The works include the restoration of natural beds including de-canalization and recreation of meanders, reclamation of valleys, restoration of natural banks, control of invasive animals (coypu) and plant species (Ludwigia, Baccharis) and reintroduction of indigenous species.

== Activities ==
Today, the canal is used more for recreational activities, fishing and kayaking. The old towpath forms the base of a hiking trail between the port of Pornic and the Clion bridge.
