= Arthon-en-Retz =

- Part of Chaumes-en-Retz
- Coat of arms
- Location of Arthon-en-Retz
- Location within France Location within Pays de la Loire
- Coordinates: 47°07′02″N 1°56′15″W
- Country: France
- Region: Pays de la Loire
- Department: Loire-Atlantique
- Arrondissement: Saint-Nazaire
- Canton: Pornic
- Commune: Chaumes-en-Retz
- Area^{1}: 39.24 km^{2} (15.15 sq mi)
- Highest elevation: 61 m (200 ft)
- Lowest elevation: 1 m (3.3 ft)
- Population (2022): 4,497
  - Density: 114.6/km^{2} (296.8/sq mi)
- Time zone: UTC+01:00 (CET)
  - Summer (DST): UTC+02:00 (CEST)
- Postal code: 44320
- ^{1} French Land Register data, which excludes lakes, ponds, glaciers > 1 km^{2} (0.386 sq mi or 247 acres) and river estuaries.

Arthon-en-Retz (French pronunciation: [aʁtɔ̃ ɑ̃ ʁɛ], literally Arthon in Retz; Breton: Arzhon-Raez) is a former commune in the Loire-Atlantique department in western France. On 1 January 2016, it was merged into the new commune of Chaumes-en-Retz. Arthon-en-Retz is situated 10 km east of Pornic, 39 km west of Nantes and 41 south of Saint-Nazaire.

== Population ==
The inhabitants are called Arthonnais in French.

Historical population

Year	Pop.	±% p.a.
1793	1,661	—
1800	1,255	−3.92%
1806	2,093	+8.90%
1821	1,681	−1.45%
1831	1,797	+0.67%
1841	1,748	−0.28%
1846	1,992	+2.65%
1851	2,103	+1.09%
1856	2,130	+0.26%
1861	2,242	+1.03%
1866	2,352	+0.96%
1872	2,304	−0.34%
1876	2,367	+0.68%
1881	2,354	−0.11%
1886	2,276	−0.67%
1891	2,319	+0.38%
1896	2,354	+0.30%
1901	2,361	+0.06%

Year	Pop.	±% p.a.
1906	2,494	+1.10%
1911	2,425	−0.56%
1921	2,142	−1.23%
1926	2,014	−1.22%
1931	1,943	−0.72%
1936	1,889	−0.56%
1946	1,766	−0.67%
1954	1,793	+0.19%
1962	1,889	+0.65%
1968	1,948	+0.51%
1975	1,933	−0.11%
1982	2,151	+1.54%
1990	2,321	+0.96%
1999	2,670	+1.57%
2006	3,127	+2.28%
2013	4,031	+3.69%
2022	4,497	+1.22%

Source: EHESS and INSEE

== Personalities ==
- Mickaël Landreau - footballer (Lille OSC)
- Anthony Charteau - cyclist

== See also ==
- Communes of the Loire-Atlantique department
