= La Bernerie-en-Retz =

La Bernerie-en-Retz La Bèrneriy/La Bèrneri (Gallo) Kerverner-Raez (Breton)
- Commune
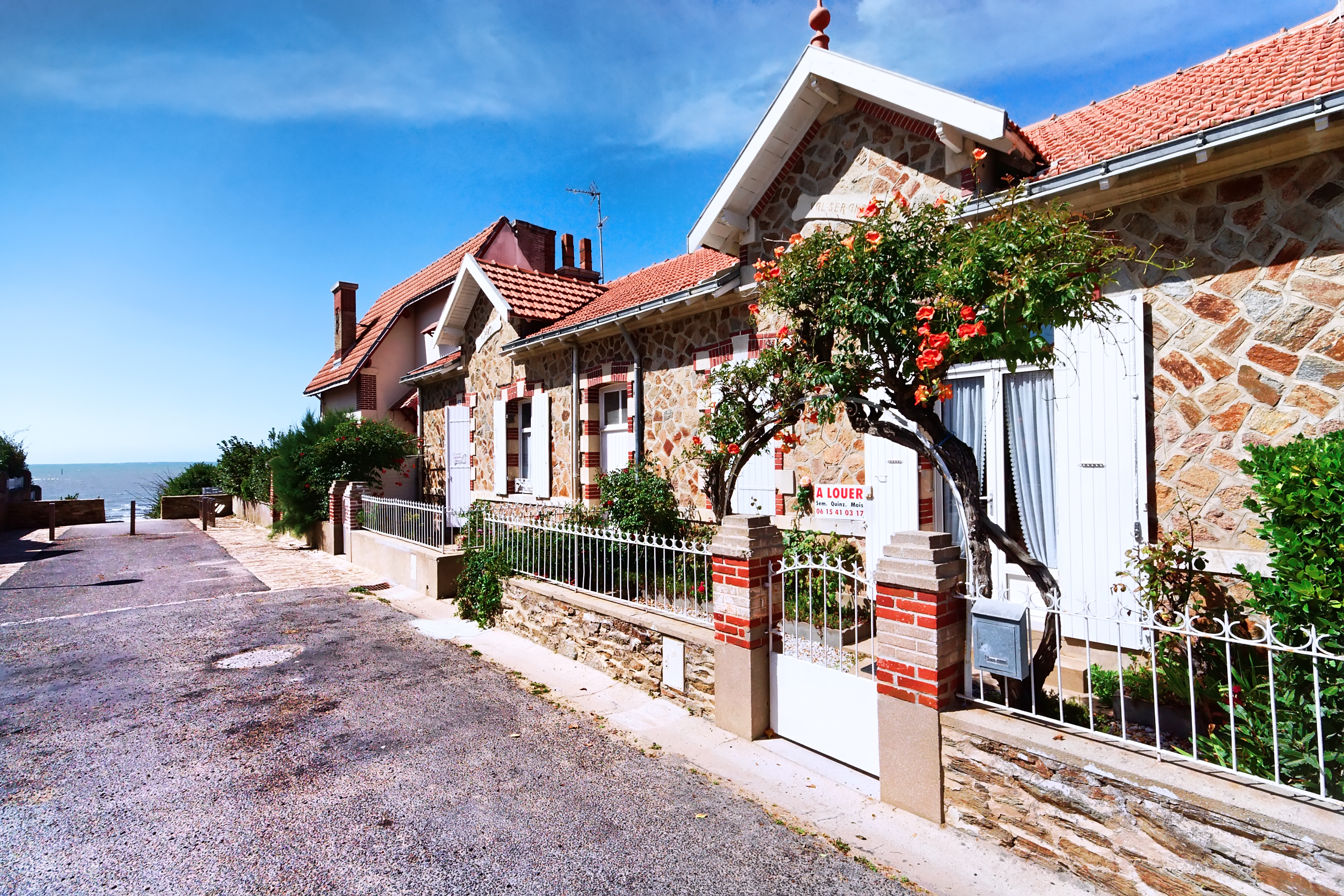

- Coat of arms
- Location of La Bernerie-en-Retz
- Location within France Location within Pays de la Loire
- Coordinates: 47°04′56″N 2°02′10″W
- Country: France
- Region: Pays de la Loire
- Department: Loire-Atlantique
- Arrondissement: Saint-Nazaire
- Canton: Pornic
- Intercommunality: CA Pornic Agglo Pays de Retz

Government
  - Mayor (2020–2026): Jacques Prieur
- Area^{1}: 6.08 km^{2} (2.35 sq mi)
- Highest elevation: 47 m (154 ft)
- Lowest elevation: 0 m (0 ft)
- Population (2023): 3,536
  - Density: 582/km^{2} (1,510/sq mi)
- Time zone: UTC+01:00 (CET)
  - Summer (DST): UTC+02:00 (CEST)
- INSEE/Postal code: 44012 /44760
- ^{1} French Land Register data, which excludes lakes, ponds, glaciers > 1 km^{2} (0.386 sq mi or 247 acres) and river estuaries.

La Bernerie-en-Retz (French pronunciation: [la bɛʁnəʁi ɑ̃ ʁɛ], literally La Bernerie in Retz; Gallo: La Bèrneriy or La Bèrneri, Breton: Kerverner-Raez) is a commune in the Loire-Atlantique department, western France.

== Population ==
Historical population

| Year | Pop. | ±% p.a. |
|---|---|---|
| 1872 | 1,023 | — |
| 1901 | 1,239 | +0.66% |
| 1926 | 1,489 | +0.74% |
| 1946 | 1,764 | +0.85% |
| 1962 | 1,593 | −0.64% |
| 1968 | 1,683 | +0.92% |
| 1975 | 1,735 | +0.44% |

| Year | Pop. | ±% p.a. |
|---|---|---|
| 1982 | 1,799 | +0.52% |
| 1990 | 1,828 | +0.20% |
| 1999 | 2,139 | +1.76% |
| 2007 | 2,512 | +2.03% |
| 2012 | 2,603 | +0.71% |
| 2017 | 2,968 | +2.66% |
| 2023 | 3,536 | +2.96% |

Source: EHESS and INSEE (1968-2023)

== Transport ==
Gare de La Bernerie-en-Retz is served by train services between Pornic and Nantes.

== See also ==
- Communes of the Loire-Atlantique department
