= Les Moutiers-en-Retz =

- Commune
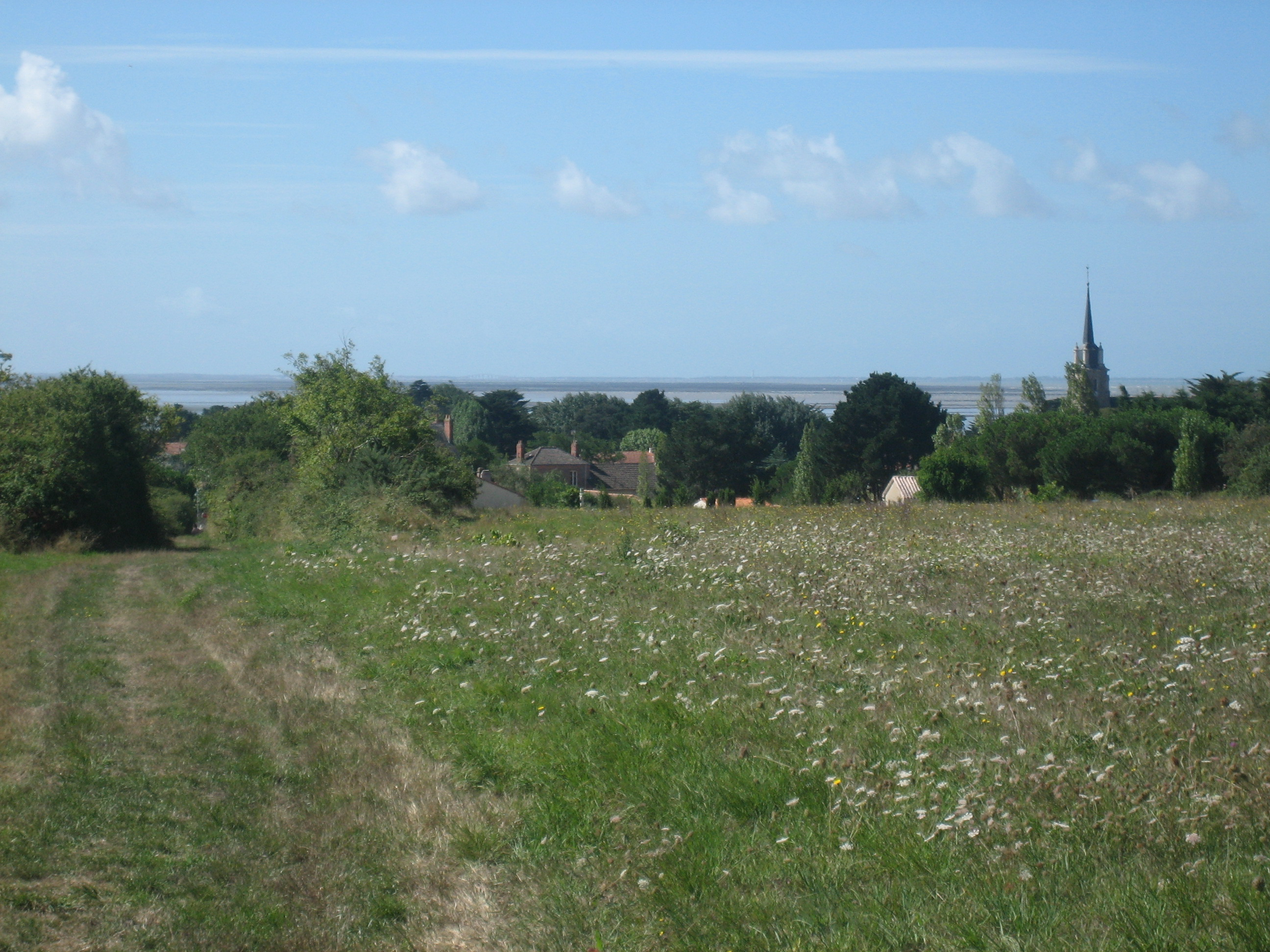

- Coat of arms
- Location of Les Moutiers-en-Retz
- Location within France Location within Pays de la Loire
- Coordinates: 47°03′48″N 2°00′01″W
- Country: France
- Region: Pays de la Loire
- Department: Loire-Atlantique
- Arrondissement: Saint-Nazaire
- Canton: Pornic
- Intercommunality: CA Pornic Agglo Pays de Retz

Government
  - Mayor (2026–32): Pascale Briand
- Area^{1}: 9.57 km^{2} (3.69 sq mi)
- Highest elevation: 39 m (128 ft)
- Lowest elevation: 0 m (0 ft)
- Population (2023): 1,939
  - Density: 203/km^{2} (525/sq mi)
- Time zone: UTC+01:00 (CET)
  - Summer (DST): UTC+02:00 (CEST)
- INSEE/Postal code: 44106 /44760
- ^{1} French Land Register data, which excludes lakes, ponds, glaciers > 1 km^{2} (0.386 sq mi or 247 acres) and river estuaries.

Les Moutiers-en-Retz (French pronunciation: [le mutje ɑ̃ ʁɛ], literally Les Moutiers in Retz; Breton: Mousteroù-Raez) is a commune in the Loire-Atlantique department in western France.

== Climate ==
The climate which characterises the town was classified, in 2010, as a “frank oceanic climate” (French: climat océanique franc), according to the typology of French climates which identified eight major types of climates in metropolitan France. In 2020, the town was classified as having an “oceanic climate” type using the classification established by Météo-France, which only has five main types of climates for mainland France. This type of climate is characterised by mild temperatures and relatively abundant rainfall (in conjunction with disturbances from the Atlantic), distributed throughout the year with a slight maximum from October to February.

The climatic parameters which made it possible to establish the 2010 typology include six variables for temperature and eight for precipitation, the values of which correspond to the monthly data for the 1971–2000 norm. The main variables characterising the municipality are presented in the box below.

Climate data for Les Moutiers en Retz 1971/2000 avg 1958 rec
Month	Jan	Feb	Mar	Apr	May	Jun	Jul	Aug	Sep	Oct	Nov	Dec	Year
Record high °C (°F)	21.2 (70.2)	27.4 (81.3)	28.8 (83.8)	33.5 (92.3)	37.7 (99.9)	46.2 (115.2)	46.5 (115.7)	45.3 (113.5)	40.9 (105.6)	33.2 (91.8)	27.4 (81.3)	22.1 (71.8)	46.5 (115.7)
Mean daily maximum °C (°F)	11 (52)	12.2 (54.0)	15 (59)	18.2 (64.8)	21.1 (70.0)	25.3 (77.5)	27.2 (81.0)	27.2 (81.0)	24.6 (76.3)	19.1 (66.4)	14.1 (57.4)	12.1 (53.8)	18.9 (66.0)
Daily mean °C (°F)	8.1 (46.6)	9.1 (48.4)	11 (52)	13.6 (56.5)	16.6 (61.9)	20.2 (68.4)	22.2 (72.0)	22.2 (72.0)	19.6 (67.3)	15.1 (59.2)	11.1 (52.0)	9.1 (48.4)	14.8 (58.6)
Mean daily minimum °C (°F)	5.1 (41.2)	6.1 (43.0)	7 (45)	9 (48)	12 (54)	15.2 (59.4)	17.2 (63.0)	17.1 (62.8)	14.5 (58.1)	11 (52)	8 (46)	6 (43)	10.7 (51.3)
Record low °C (°F)	−11.6 (11.1)	−9.3 (15.3)	−5.4 (22.3)	0.2 (32.4)	2.5 (36.5)	6.9 (44.4)	10.1 (50.2)	10.1 (50.2)	5.7 (42.3)	0.1 (32.2)	−5 (23)	−8 (18)	−11.6 (11.1)
Average precipitation mm (inches)	65.0 (2.56)	60.0 (2.36)	50.0 (1.97)	40.0 (1.57)	45.0 (1.77)	30.0 (1.18)	25.0 (0.98)	35.0 (1.38)	60.0 (2.36)	70.0 (2.76)	90.0 (3.54)	70.0 (2.76)	640.0 (25.20)
Mean monthly sunshine hours	90.0	140.0	180.0	250.0	260.0	300.0	280.0	260.0	230.0	150.0	110.0	100.0	2,350

These variables have evolved with climate change. A study carried out in 2014 by the General Directorate of Energy and Climate, supplemented by regional studies, indeed predicts that the average temperature should increase and the average rainfall decrease, but with strong regional variations. These changes have been recorded on the nearest Météo-France meteorological station in Pornic, in service since 1919, 10 km north of Moutiers-en-Retz, where the mean annual temperature is 13 °C and the rainfall is 738.1 mm for the period 1981–2010. At the next closest historical meteorological station, "Nantes-Bouguenais", 31 km east inland of Moutiers-en-Retz in the town of Bouguenais, operational since 1945, the annual average temperature changes by 12.2 °C for the period 1971–2000, 12.5 °C for 1981–2010, then 12.7 °C for 1991–2020.

== Population ==
Historical population
Year	Pop.	±% p.a.
1968	614	—
1975	635	+0.48%
1982	693	+1.26%
1990	739	+0.81%
1999	905	+2.28%
2007	1,188	+3.46%
2012	1,421	+3.65%
2017	1,640	+2.91%
2023	1,939	+2.83%
Source: INSEE

== Transport ==
Les Moutiers-en-Retz station is served by train services between Pornic and Nantes.

== See also ==
- Communes of the Loire-Atlantique department
