= Paydret =

- Paydret
- Native to: France
- Region: Loire-Atlantique (Pays de Retz)
- Language family: Indo-European: Italic; Latino-Faliscan; Latin; Romance; Italo-Western; Western; Gallo-Iberian?; Gallo-Romance; Gallo-Rhaetian?; Arpitan–Oïl; Oïl; Armorican zone; Paydret
- Writing system: Latin script

Language codes
- ISO 639-3: –
- Linguasphere: 51-AAA-ha

Paydret is a langue d'oïl, spoken in the Pays de Retz in the Loire-Atlantique.

Certain characteristics of this language make it difficult for linguists specialising in the langues d’oïl to classify. Paydret exhibits several traits typical of the Poitevin dialect, yet it also shares many similarities with the Gallo language.

Still relatively widely spoken, Paydret tends to merge into French, to which it is closely related - like all the langues d’oïl.

== See also ==
- Languages of France
- Language policy in France
