= Chauvé =

Chauvé Chauvàè (Gallo) Kalveg (Breton)
- Commune
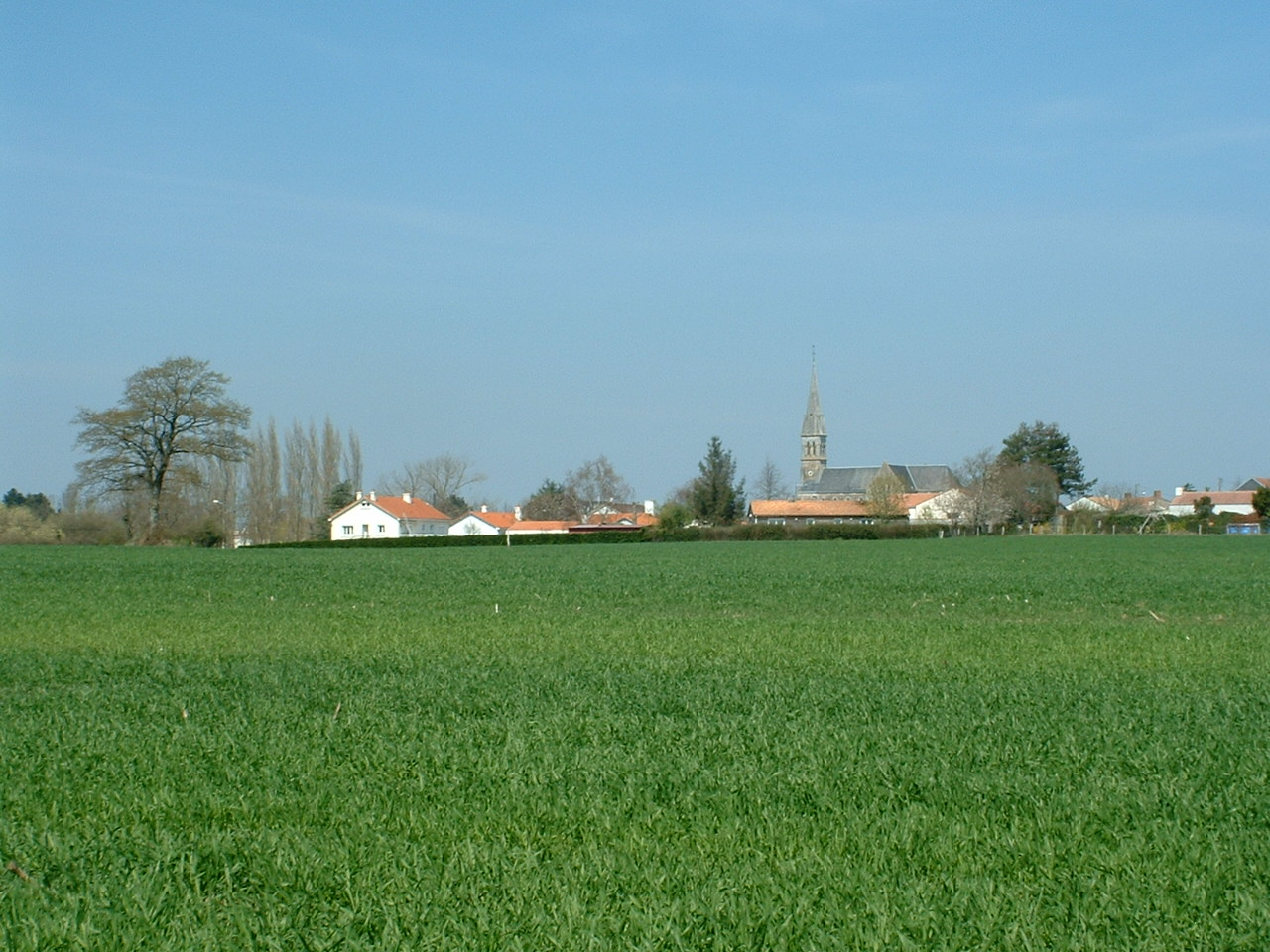

- Coat of arms
- Location of Chauvé
- Location within France Location within Pays de la Loire
- Coordinates: 47°09′07″N 1°59′05″W
- Country: France
- Region: Pays de la Loire
- Department: Loire-Atlantique
- Arrondissement: Saint-Nazaire
- Canton: Pornic
- Intercommunality: CA Pornic Agglo Pays de Retz

Government
  - Mayor (2020–2026): Pierre Martin
- Area^{1}: 40.98 km^{2} (15.82 sq mi)
- Highest elevation: 62 m (203 ft)
- Lowest elevation: 0 m (0 ft)
- Population (2023): 3,070
  - Density: 74.9/km^{2} (194/sq mi)
- Time zone: UTC+01:00 (CET)
  - Summer (DST): UTC+02:00 (CEST)
- INSEE/Postal code: 44038 /44320
- ^{1} French Land Register data, which excludes lakes, ponds, glaciers > 1 km^{2} (0.386 sq mi or 247 acres) and river estuaries.

Chauvé (French pronunciation: [ʃove]; Gallo: Chauvàè, Breton: Kalveg) is a commune in the Loire-Atlantique department in western France.

Inhabited since prehistoric times, as evidenced by the numerous menhirs found there, Chauvé is located to the west of Loire-Atlantique, a few kilometers from the coast. The commune is part of historic Brittany, in the traditional region of the Pays de Retz and in the historic region of the Pays Nantais.

Chauvé is located 33 km south of Saint-Nazaire and 42 km west of Nantes.

== Origin of the name ==
The main consensus is that the name originates from the Merovingian period with a coin found in the 19th century inscribed with the word Cavidius. A text dating from 1100 mentions Chialvahe, another from 1104 designates the presbyter of Calval or Calvac, Chauvay in 1287. The name is attested in the form Chauval in 1406, Chauvoie in 1409 and Chauvaye in 1410 and finally, Chauve in 1815. Albert Dauzat, a French linguist explained this toponym by the Gallo-Roman formation *CALVACU, on the basis of a Gallo-Roman anthroponym Calvus "the bald" cf. surnames of the type Chauvin, Cauvin, etc., it is followed by the suffix -ACU (Dauzat notes -acum). During the French Revolution, the commune was called Haxo-les-Landes. Its inhabitants are called Chauvéens.

== History ==
=== Prehistory ===
Originally a very wooded area, having shown minimal evidence of remains or traces of human activity in the Neolithic period. Several structures however are known from this period, the presence of megaliths such as menhirs, the most notable being the Pierre Le Matz Menhir at La Tendonnerie and the megaliths found at La Croterie and Platennes. These three sandstone menhirs, stand between 4 and 5 meters tall.

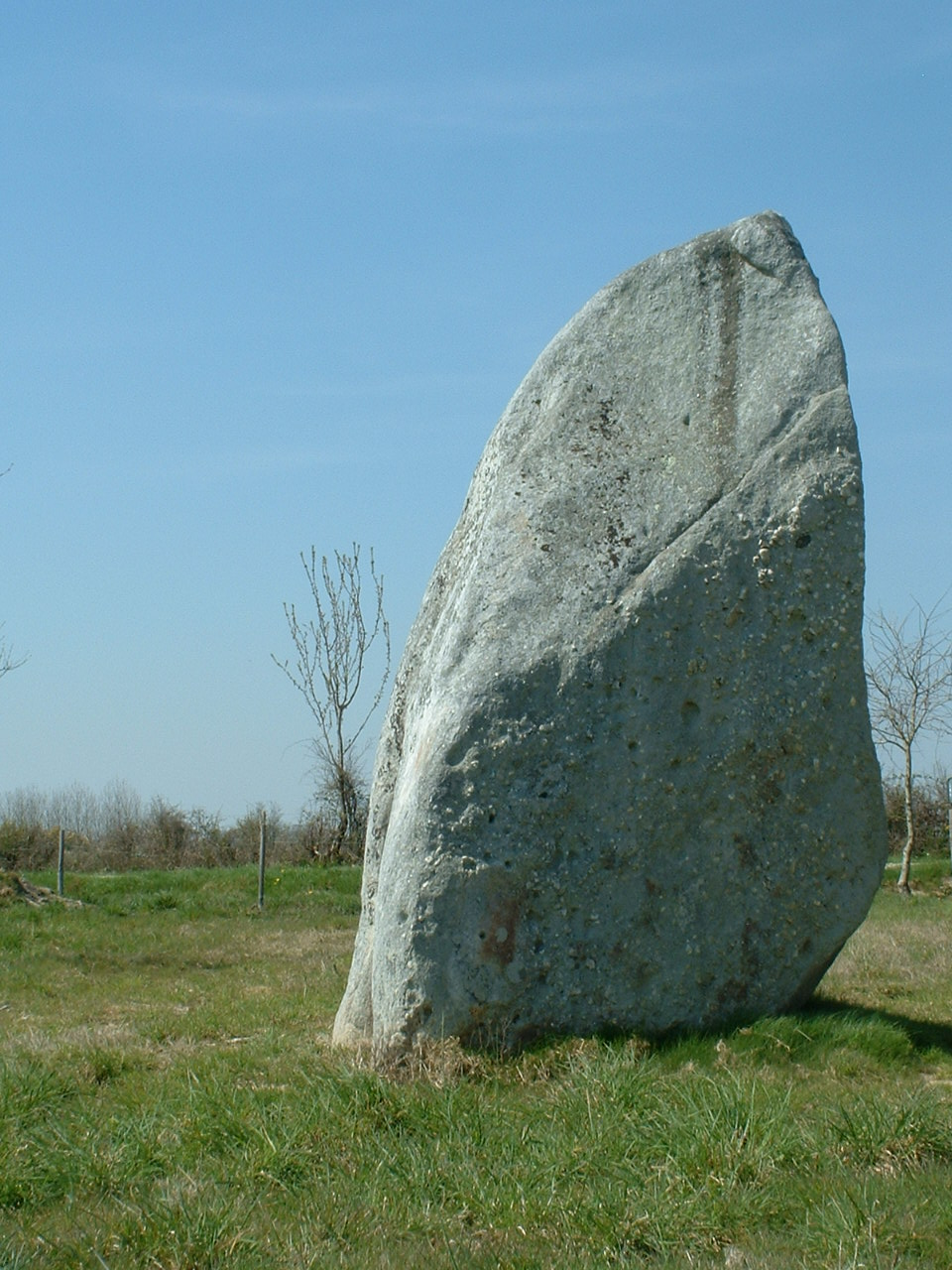
Pierre Le Matz Menhir found in the Commune

=== Gallo Roman Period ===
In Épinerie, a grey stone marker dating from the Gallo-Roman period was found and is assumed to be Roman in origin. At Le Pin, a very old Celtic sandstone cross has been re-erected not far from its original location after being knocked down during the French Revolution.

=== Middle Ages ===
After the expulsion of the Vikings, Alan II, Duke of Brittany and his successors with aid from the Carolingians built fortified enclosures, generally near waterways. By 960 it was still necessary to protect the area from raids.

When a territory was liberated, the Lord kept a portion and distributed the rest to supporters, who were subject to a fee, known as the chevage. With peace restored, the Church hierarchy started to retake control of all places of worship. One of the first known priests was documented as Rivallon, who controlled the churches of Frossay, Chauvé and Arthon. This priest may have been the son of Droaloi, the Viscount of Migron. Rivallon had a son, Urvoy who donated the communities to the monks of Saint Sauveur around the year 1100. In Urvoy’s time a water mill was also built (between 940 and 970) for grinding wheat, near the Mulon River, which owes its name to the mill. Apart from the mill, evidence has been found of metallurgical activities in the area with a slagheap found at Les Platennes, a sign of the presence of a forge.

By the 13th or 14th century, the Viscounty of Migron was divided into the Lordship of Bois-Joly and the Lordship of Rigaudière. The priory of Saint-Germain de Chauvé became a parish under the action of the Lord of Bois-Joly. The patron saint of the parish was named Saint Martin of Tours. The area was heavily wooded and progressive clearing of the land was done concentrically from the church. The residents of Chauvé had a rather strange duty owed to their lords in this time. At Christmas, they had to "provide the Lord of Pornic with a cart, pulled by two oxen, carrying a woodcock and a five-hole flute".

=== 15th-16th Centuries ===
Noble houses dating from this period can be found at Rivière-Mulon and Rigaudière.

=== 17th-18th Centuries ===
By the 18th century, Chauvé was still relatively isolated, mainly by the surrounding "Forest de Princez", as well as the marshes of Haute-Perche and Michelais.

In 1786, the Marquis Alexandre de Brie-Serrant, last lord of Retz, initiated the Haute-Perche canal project whose aim was to link Pornic to the Acheneau, a river in the Pays de Retz flowing into the Loire. The project remained unfinished. It merges with the Haute-Perche river and has no adjacent waterway. Its only notable work is the Pornic lock, one of the smallest in France, built in 1855 and now out of use.

The population, were forced to participate in a militia, which then developed into a territorial guard by 1726. Recruitment changed by 1756; when recruits were drawn by lot and were incorporated into coastguard companies, and from 1778 into gunner companies. The population of Chauvé had a reputation for being resistant to such levies.

By 1780s the area had a bad harvest and fear of famine spread. Records exist showing many Chauvéens wanted political change such as the parish priest who in his diary wrote about the meeting of the Estates General, which took place on 5 May 1789. In 1790, the citizens of Chauvé elected ten representatives for the canton of Frossay for the primary elections of the department of Loire-Inférieure.

However when the Civil Constitution of the Clergy Decree passed in 1790, resulted in the arrest of the town's abbot, the seizing of the property in the parish and the raising of soldiers to defend the Republic, pushed the population to revolt. On the night of 9 and 10 March 1793, Chauvé was the first commune in the district of Paimbœuf to rise up marking the beginning of the War in the Vendée. By 10 March these rebels were in control of the town. Joining the rebels of neighboring communes, they participated in the capture of Vue. They then became part of the troops of the royalist troops called the Catheliniere. This resulted in the Convention sending its troops to Paimbœuf and Machecoul. Chauvé was subsequently burned. After a lull, the war resumed and reached the commune again in 1795. The Chauvéens rebellion ended up surrendering.

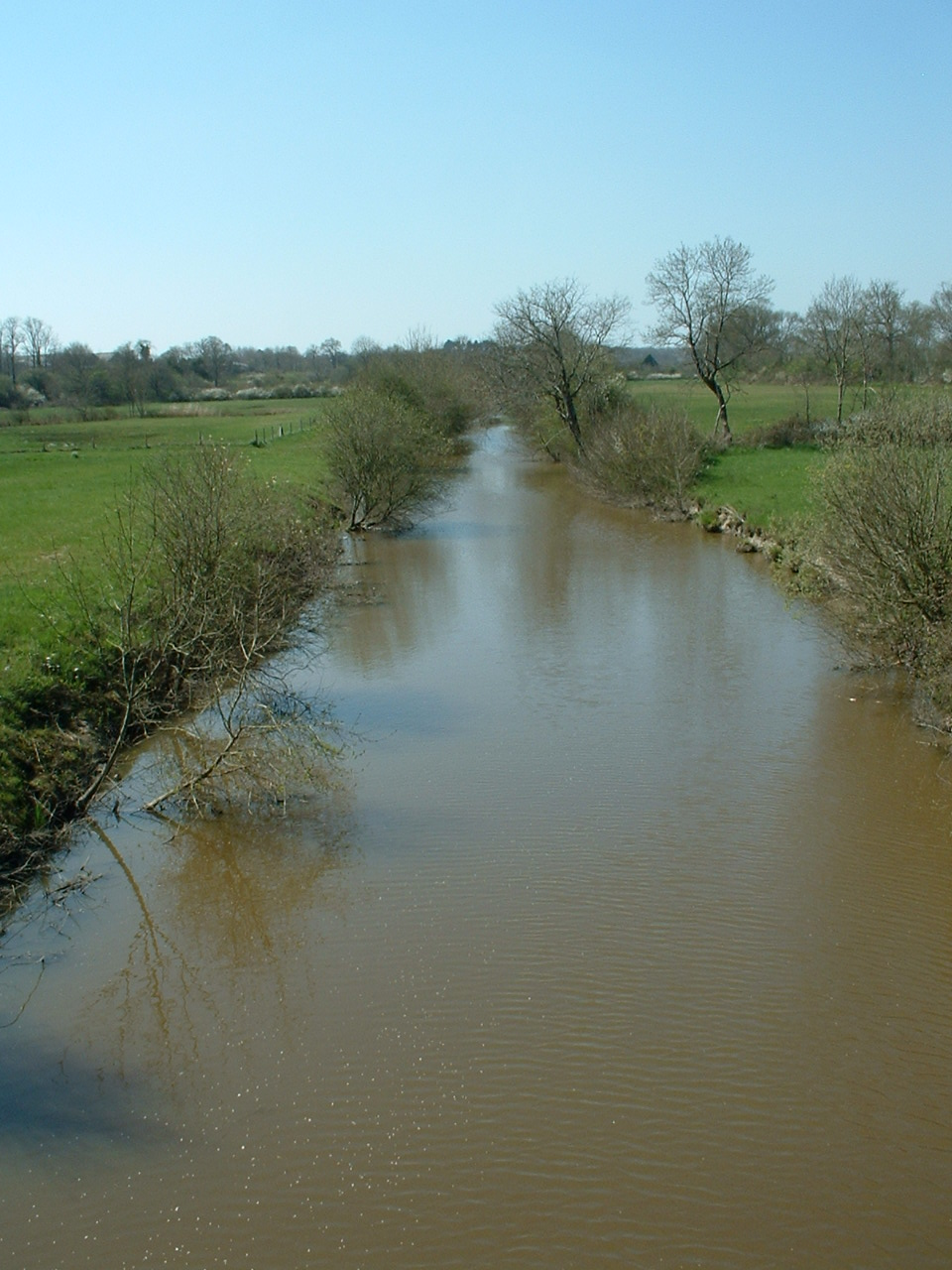
Canal de Haute-Perche

=== Contemporary period ===
During the Second World War, German troops resisted in the Saint-Nazaire pocket and Chauvé was the scene of fighting. The church bell tower that served as a watchtower was destroyed by a German shell on 13 January 1945. Projectiles hit the building again on 23 March and 12 April. The reconstruction of the building was completed on 18 February 1950. After a period marked by rural exodus, Chauvé experienced rapid growth for a few years after concluding a twinning agreement with the Irish town of Killala, in memory of the Republican General Humbert, mandated by the Directory in 1798.

== Urbanisation ==
A rural commune with strong agricultural activity, Chauvé is a central town with several outlying hamlets. Of the 740 main residences built before 2004, 240 (32.5%) were built before 1949, 87 (11.7%) between 1949 and 1974, 211 (28.6%) between 1975 and 1989, and finally 202 (27.2%) between 1990 and 2003.

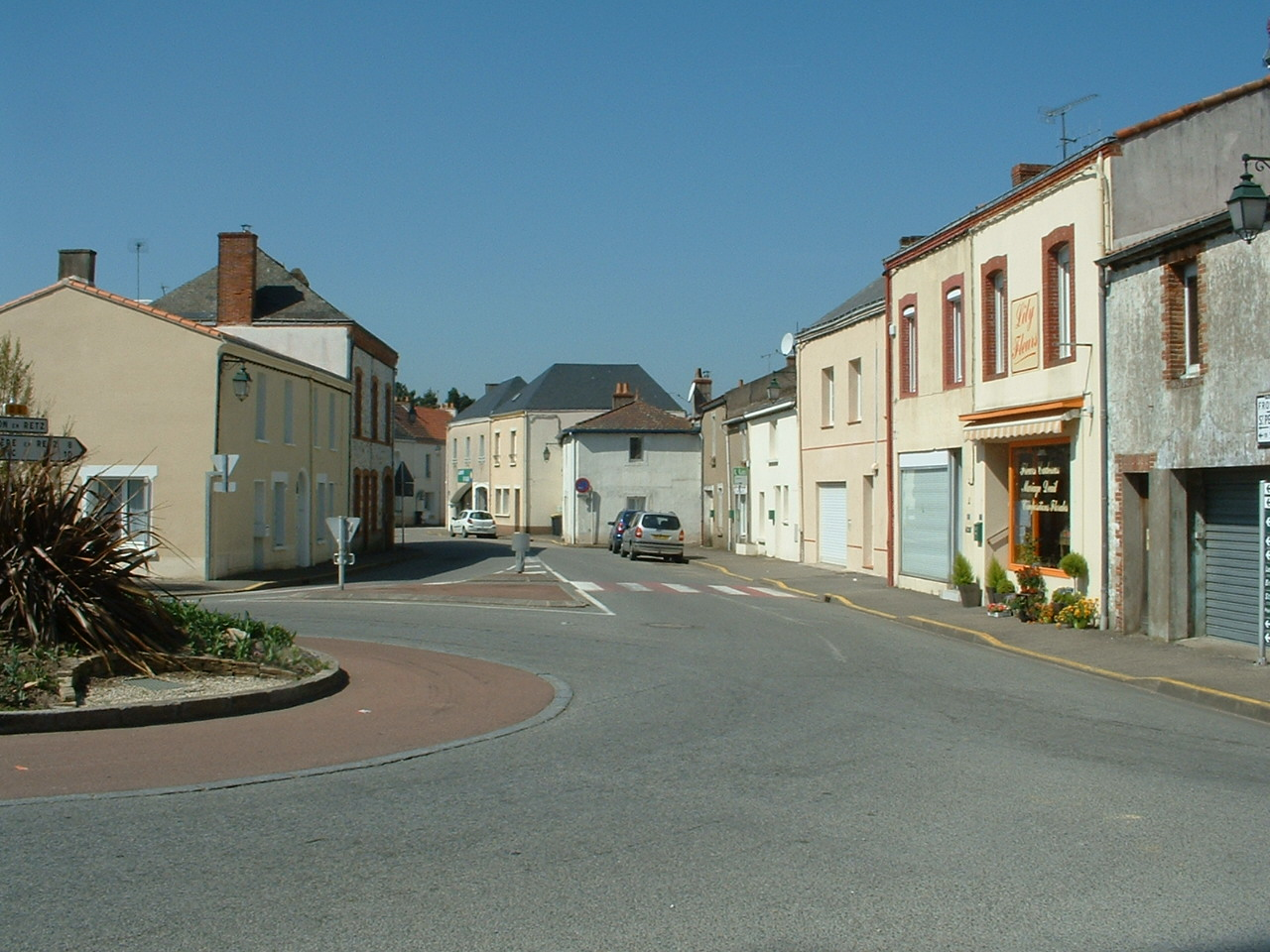
Habitat du bourg

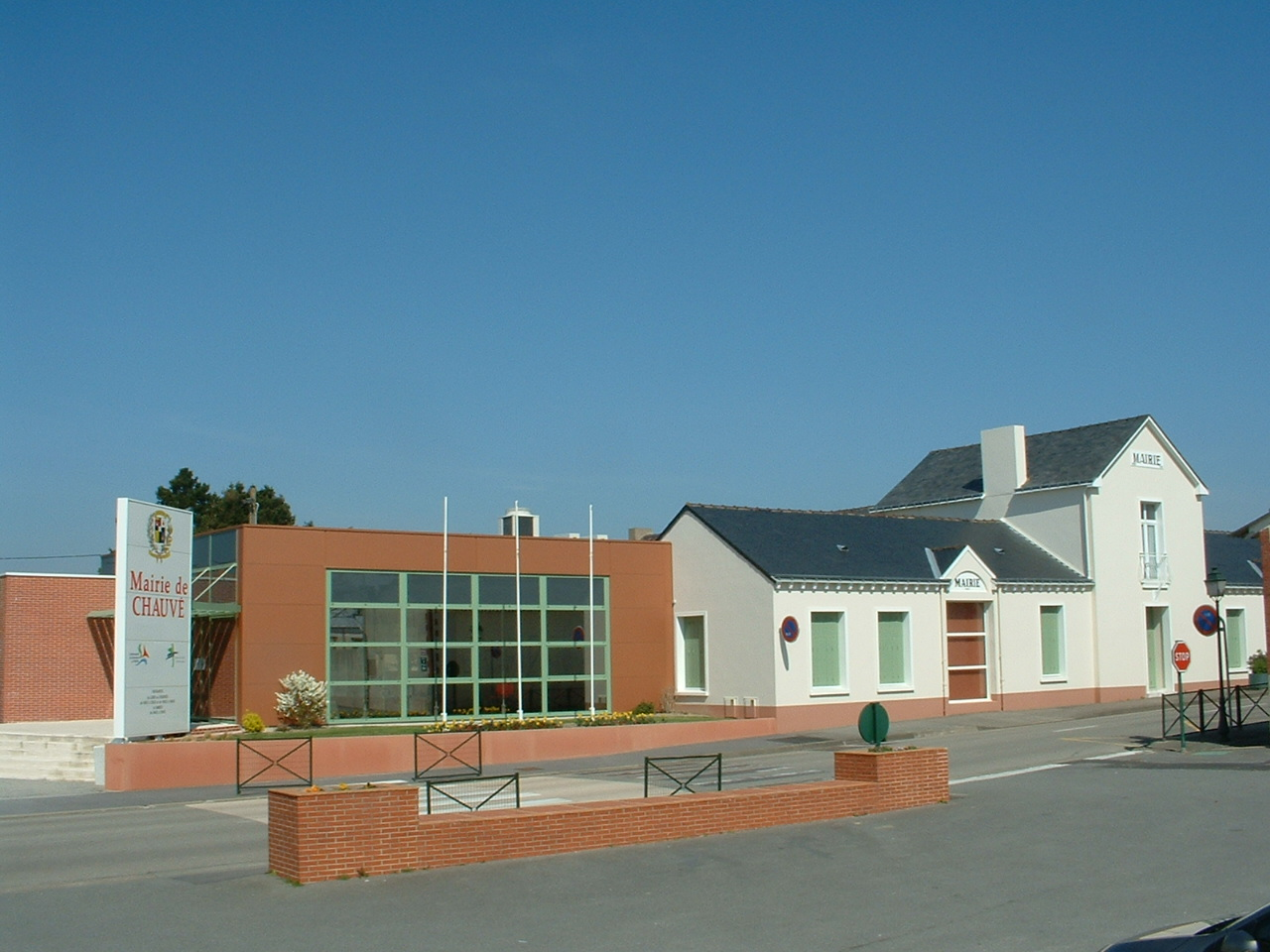
Hôtel de ville

== Population ==
Historical population

Year	Pop.	±% p.a.
1793	1,356	—
1821	1,598	+0.59%
1846	1,677	+0.19%
1872	1,826	+0.33%
1901	1,798	−0.05%
1926	1,576	−0.53%
1946	1,337	−0.82%
1962	1,337	+0.00%
1968	1,307	−0.38%

Year	Pop.	±% p.a.
1975	1,238	−0.77%
1982	1,348	+1.22%
1990	1,589	+2.08%
1999	1,695	+0.72%
2007	2,333	+4.07%
2012	2,604	+2.22%
2017	2,876	+2.01%
2023	3,070	+1.09%

Source: EHESS and INSEE (1968-2023)

== Twin towns ==
- Killala, Co. Mayo, Ireland - since 1998

== See also ==
- Communes of the Loire-Atlantique department
