= Saint-Hilaire-de-Chaléons =

- Commune
- Coat of arms
- Location of Saint-Hilaire-de-Chaléons
- Location within France Location within Pays de la Loire
- Coordinates: 47°06′14″N 1°51′49″W
- Country: France
- Region: Pays de la Loire
- Department: Loire-Atlantique
- Arrondissement: Saint-Nazaire
- Canton: Machecoul-Saint-Même
- Intercommunality: CA Pornic Agglo Pays de Retz

Government
  - Mayor (2020–2026): Françoise Relandeau
- Area^{1}: 34.98 km^{2} (13.51 sq mi)
- Elevation: 14 m (46 ft)
- Highest elevation: 32 m (105 ft)
- Lowest elevation: 1 m (3.3 ft)
- Population (2023): 2,422
  - Density: 69.24/km^{2} (179.3/sq mi)
- Time zone: UTC+01:00 (CET)
  - Summer (DST): UTC+02:00 (CEST)
- INSEE/Postal code: 44164 /44680
- ^{1} French Land Register data, which excludes lakes, ponds, glaciers > 1 km^{2} (0.386 sq mi or 247 acres) and river estuaries.

Saint-Hilaire-de-Chaléons (French pronunciation: [sɛ̃.t‿ilɛʁ də ʃaleɔ̃]; Breton: Sant-Eler-Kaleon) is a commune in the Loire-Atlantique department in western France.

== Population ==
Historical population
Year	Pop.	±% p.a.
1968	1,311	—
1975	1,255	−0.62%
1982	1,362	+1.18%
1990	1,333	−0.27%
1999	1,545	+1.65%
2007	1,841	+2.22%
2012	2,075	+2.42%
2017	2,287	+1.96%
2023	2,422	+0.96%
Source: INSEE

== Transport ==
Saint-Hilaire-de-Chaléons station is served by train services between Pornic and Nantes.

== See also ==
- Communes of the Loire-Atlantique department
