= Chaumes-en-Retz =

Chaumes-en-Retz Kalaved-Raez (Breton)
- Commune
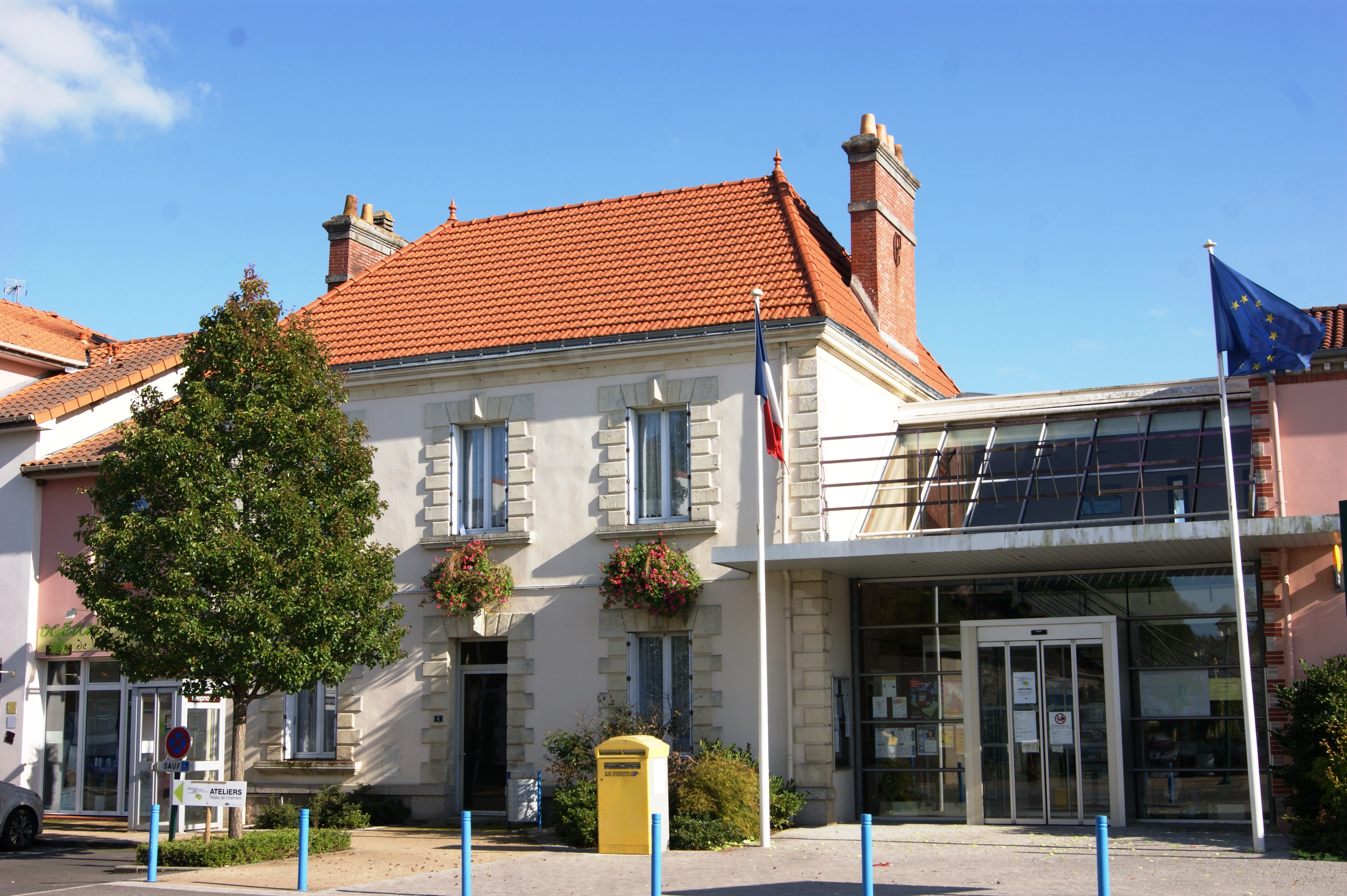
- Town hall
- Location of Chaumes-en-Retz
- Location within France Location within Pays de la Loire
- Coordinates: 47°06′58″N 1°56′31″W
- Country: France
- Region: Pays de la Loire
- Department: Loire-Atlantique
- Arrondissement: Saint-Nazaire
- Canton: Pornic and Machecoul-Saint-Même
- Intercommunality: Pornic Agglo Pays de Retz

Government
  - Mayor (2020–2026): Jacky Drouet
- Area^{1}: 76.55 km^{2} (29.56 sq mi)
- Highest elevation: 61 m (200 ft)
- Lowest elevation: 1 m (3.3 ft)
- Population (2023): 7,440
  - Density: 97.2/km^{2} (252/sq mi)
- Time zone: UTC+01:00 (CET)
  - Summer (DST): UTC+02:00 (CEST)
- INSEE/Postal code: 44005 /44320, 44680
- ^{1} French Land Register data, which excludes lakes, ponds, glaciers > 1 km^{2} (0.386 sq mi or 247 acres) and river estuaries.

Chaumes-en-Retz (French pronunciation: [ʃom ɑ̃ ʁɛ], literally Chaumes in Retz; Breton: Kalaved-Raez) is a commune in the department of Loire-Atlantique in western France. The municipality was established on 1 January 2016 by merger of the former communes of Arthon-en-Retz and Chéméré.

== Population ==
Population data refer to the commune in its geography as of January 2025.

Historical population
Year	Pop.	±% p.a.
1968	3,188	—
1975	3,171	−0.08%
1982	3,528	+1.54%
1990	3,768	+0.83%
1999	4,253	+1.35%
2007	5,448	+3.14%
2012	6,422	+3.34%
2017	6,759	+1.03%
2023	7,440	+1.61%
Source: INSEE

== See also ==
- Communes of the Loire-Atlantique department
