= Casinos in Pornic =

Set of casinos in Pornic, France

Casinos of Pornic
- Les Casinos de Pornic
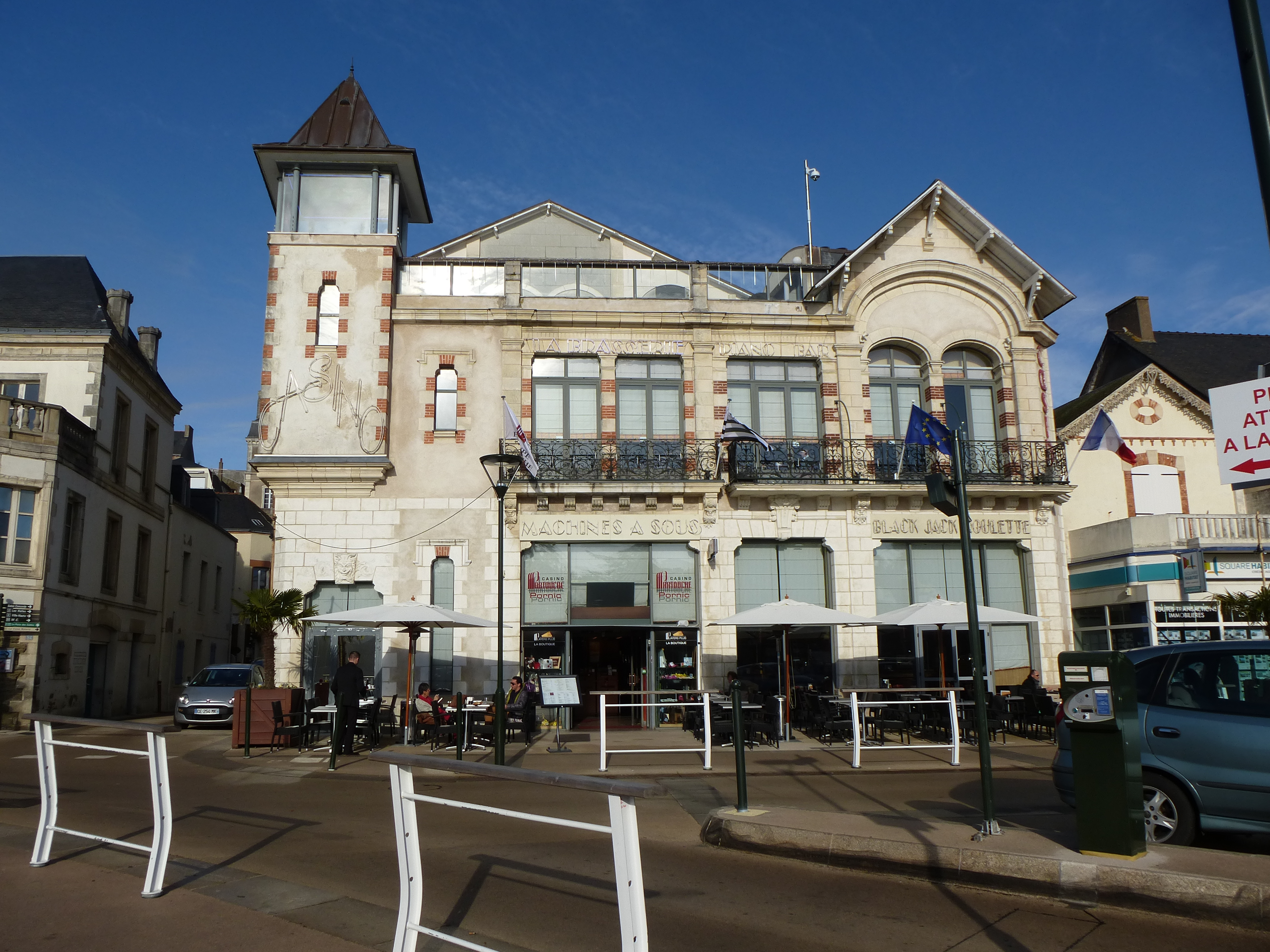
- The former Casino du Môle on the Quai Leray

General information
- Location: Pornic, Loire-Atlantique, Pays de la Loire, France
- Coordinates: 47.1160658°N 2.092123°W
- Owner: Groupe Partouche

The casinos in Pornic are located in Loire-Atlantique, France, and were built between 1853 and 2018. Only the most recent, located along the Canal de Haute Perche, still operates as a casino. It is run by the Partouche Group and has a restaurant.

Of the buildings (on five sites) that housed the seven casinos that have existed, five still stand. Their preservation has at times required heritage restoration work, the most recent of which began in 2024.

== History ==
=== Early casinos ===
The first casino in the town, and one of the first in France, was built and opened in 1853 at La Noëveillard. It was the sixth casino to open in France, after those of Dieppe, Boulogne-sur-Mer, Saint-Malo and Trouville.

==== Casino de la Terrasse ====
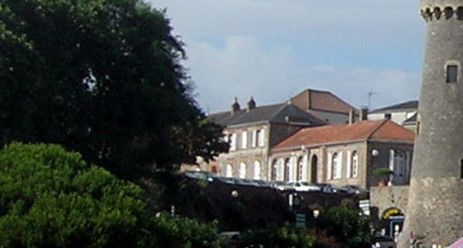
The former Casino de la Terrasse

In 1859, another casino opened in the building on the Place de la Terrasse, which housed a hotel and baths. This casino had a very short existence, closing in 1862.

The historic building of the Casino de la Terrasse still stands and has been undergoing heritage restoration work since 2024.

==== Casino de la Noëveillard, third building ====
A third casino was built in 1880 on La Noëveillard beach, in a project led by M. Maucard, replacing the first casino of 1853. The building was designed by Alfred Benoist and Léon-Félix Lenoir.

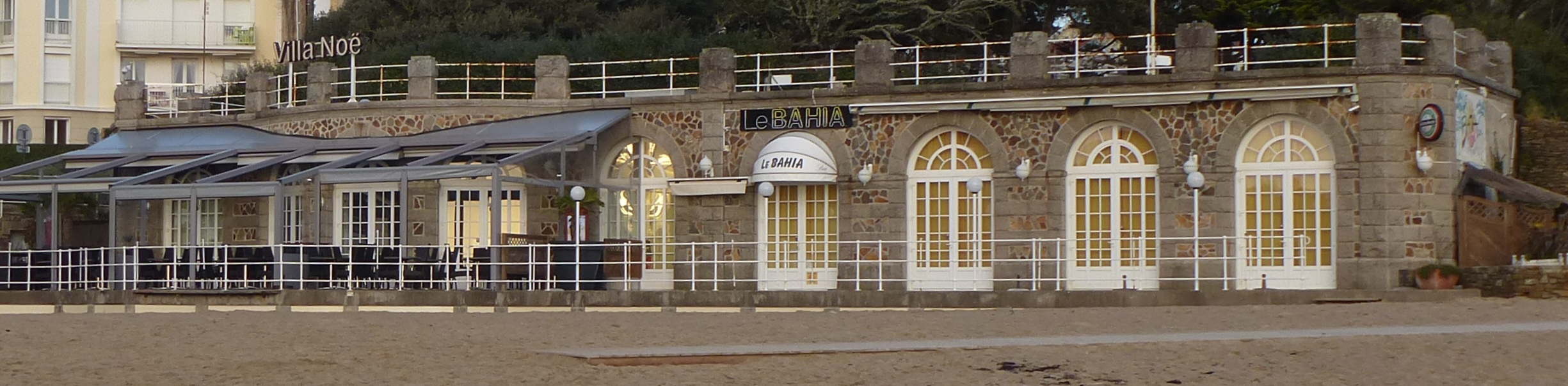
The former Casino de la Noëveillard (1913 reconstruction and 1931 extension)

The Café-Casino de la Noëveillard was subsequently demolished entirely, and a sixth casino (counting the two new casinos of Gourmalon in 1885 and Le Môle in 1893) was built on the site in 1913 by the architect Paul Devorsine, with the patronage of M. Fenaille. The Casino de la Noëveillard was then relaunched by M. Wilfrid, who extended the building in 1931.

Casino activity ended in 1932, and the building has since had other uses, including a reception hall for the town hall, a nightclub, a sailing club, a gourmet restaurant and a beach bar.

=== Fourth casino, La Source beach ===
The fourth casino of Pornic, also known as the Casino des Flots, was inaugurated in 1885 on La Source beach in the Gourmalon cove. (Note: La Source casino: 47°06′25″N 2°05′49″W.) It was built for the Société immobilière des bains de mer de Pornic, founded in 1883 by Alfred Benoist, a local notable who became mayor in 1871, and Léon-Félix Lenoir, an architect from Nantes, who had already worked together ten years earlier on the urbanisation of the site. Lenoir oversaw the construction of the new casino, drawing inspiration from the Palais du Trocadéro in Paris.

The casino was sold in 1888 to Charles Lelan, a wholesale grocer from Saint-Nazaire, who probably had it enlarged at that time, as shown by a postcard depicting a building attached to the rear façade of the original structure.

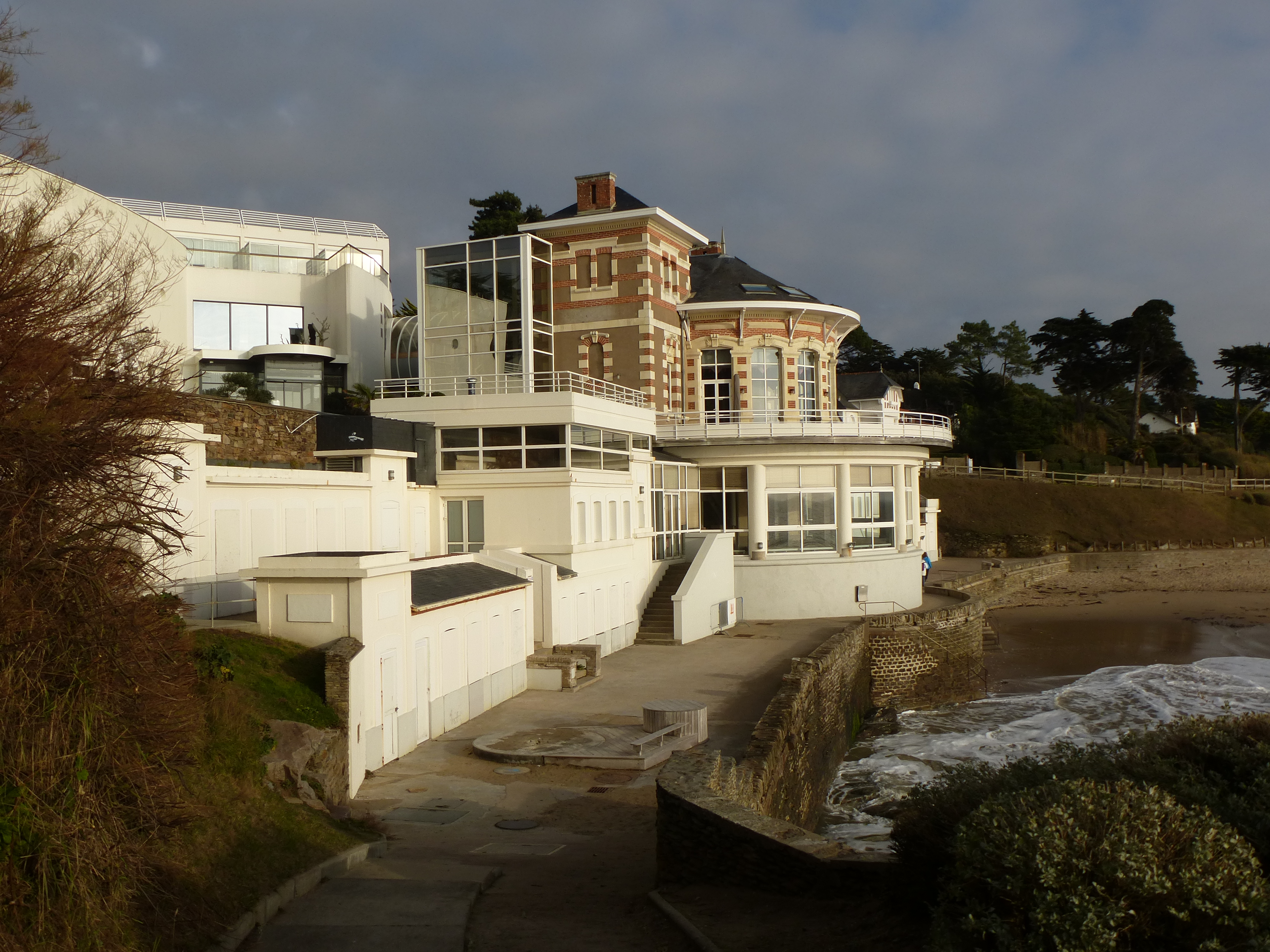
The former Casino de la Source

In 1911, Lenoir brought a lawsuit against a fellow architect, Jules Bureau, the architect of the town of Royan, claiming that the façade of the Alfred Amiot private clinic that Bureau had built there (destroyed in 1944 by bombing) plagiarised his work. Lenoir won his case: the judgment ordered, among other things, "that Bureau's name be removed from the Amiot house if it has been affixed, and replaced by the inscription 'Built according to Lenoir's plans', all at Bureau's expense, and this even with the assistance of the police commissioner".

In 1947, the town bought the establishment.

Since 1990, the building has been part of the Pornic thalassotherapy centre, which employs 170 people and includes a four-star hotel.

The timeline of the 7 casinos of Pornic

=== Fifth casino, Place du Môle ===
The fifth casino, the Casino du Môle, was built before 1893 on the Quai Leray. (Note: Casino du Môle: 47°06′54″N 2°06′11″W.) It was transformed in 1896 by Maurice Regnier, an architect from Nantes, to meet the needs of the growing number of holidaymakers who came to amuse themselves after sea bathing.

In 1908, the director at the time, M. Buisson, considerably remodelled and enlarged the building. After 1920, rooms were built on the terrace. Until 1926, the establishment served three functions: café, theatre and gaming room (baccarat and petits chevaux). After a fire in 1992 ravaged the building, it was rebuilt almost identically, allowing its façade to be preserved.

After the Ria casino opened in 2018, the Môle casino was converted into a brasserie-restaurant, Marius Lieu Epicurien, and a gourmet restaurant, Marius à La Belle Etoile, with seating for 410 diners including a 50-seat panoramic rooftop terrace.

=== Seventh casino, Ria de Pornic ===
In 2018, the casino moved from the Quai Leray to the new Ria tourist complex, east of the town centre.

The new building, designed on an elliptical plan by the Rouen architect Emmanuel Delabranche, includes an 800 m^{2} (8,600 sq ft) gaming room with 150 machines (compared with 102 in the former casino) and poker tables, which had not been offered before. Adjoining the main room, a 180 m^{2} (1,900 sq ft) terrace is the largest gaming area for smokers in France. The Ria casino also includes a 120-seat restaurant.

== Chronological list of buildings ==
Casinos of Pornic in chronological order
No.	Building construction date	Casino inauguration date	Location	Name(s)	Key people	Subsequent history	Ref.
(1)	1853	1853	La Noëveillard beach	Café-Casino de la Noëveillard	Stanislas Bocandé (backer and founder of the casino)	Rebuilt between 1878 and 1880	
(2)	1830	1859	Place de la Terrasse	Casino de la Terrasse	Aimé Louis Joseph Lebreton (backer of the building as a hotel and baths), Stanislas Bocandé (founder of the casino)	Sold in 1862; casino ceased operation. Building still standing (under restoration since 2024).	
(3)	1878	1880	La Noëveillard beach	Café-Casino de la Noëveillard	Alfred Benoist and Léon-Félix Lenoir (architects), M. Maucard (casino manager)	Demolished in 1912	
(4)	1883	1885	La Source beach, Gourmalon	Casino des Flots; Casino de la Source; Casino de Gourmalon	Léon-Félix Lenoir (architect)	Building bought by the town of Pornic in 1947; casino ceased operation. Building still standing (restaurant of a thalassotherapy centre).	
(5)	Before 1893	1893	Place du Môle, Vieux Port	Casino du Môle; Grand Casino du Môle; Casino Partouche	Maurice Regnier (architect)	Casino moved to another site in 2018. Building still standing (gourmet restaurant and brasserie, Marius).	
(6)	1913; extended 1931	1913	La Noëveillard beach	Casino de la Noëveillard	M. Fenaille (patron), Paul Devorsine (architect), M. Wilfrid (casino manager)	Building bought by the town of Pornic in 1932; casino ceased operation. Building still standing (restaurant and beach bar).	
(7)	2017	2018	Ria de Pornic	Casino de Pornic; Casino Partouche; Casino de la Ria	Emmanuel Delabranche (architect)	Casino in operation.	
