= Paulx =

- Commune
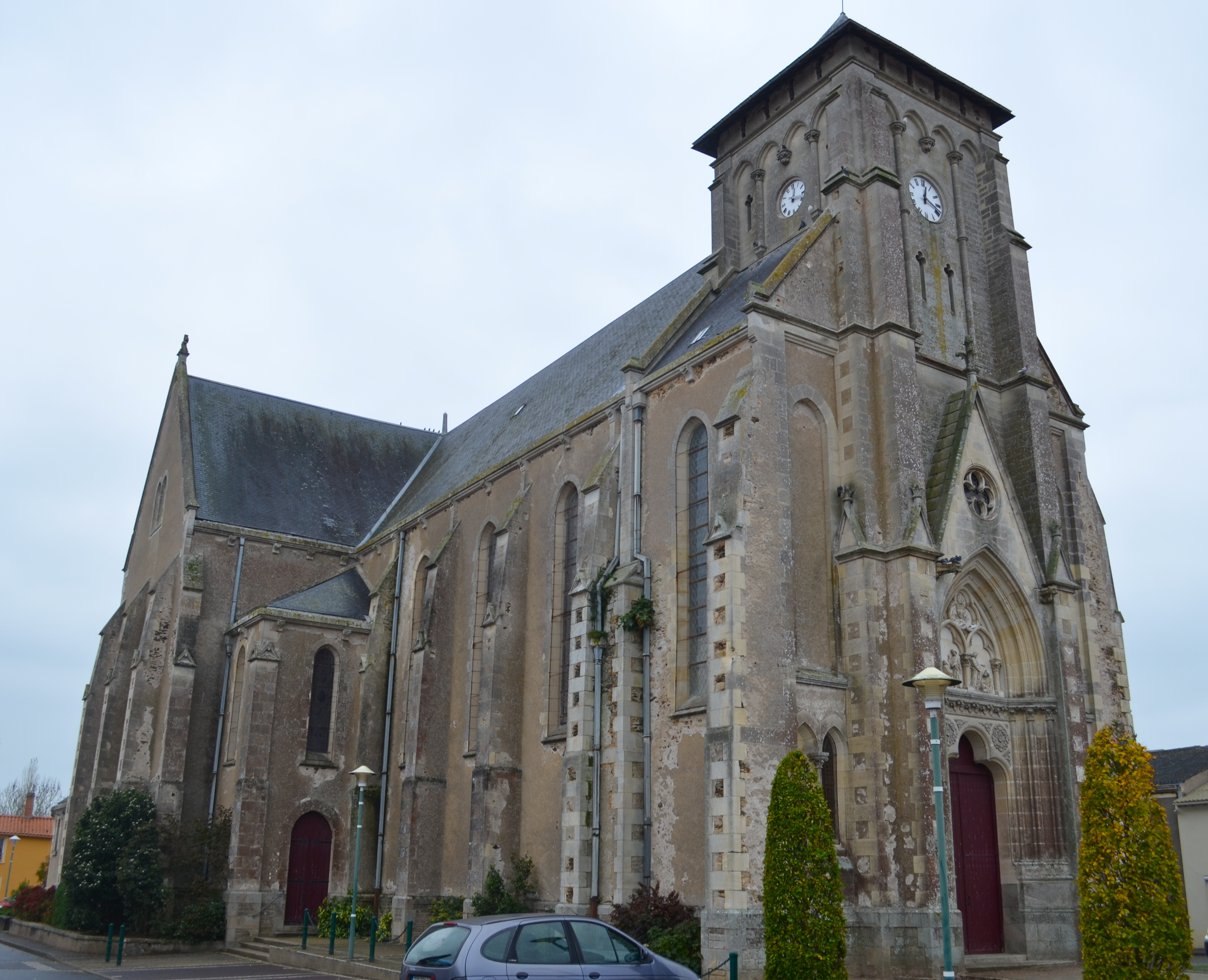

- Coat of arms
- Location of Paulx
- Location within France Location within Pays de la Loire
- Coordinates: 46°58′00″N 1°45′00″W
- Country: France
- Region: Pays de la Loire
- Department: Loire-Atlantique
- Arrondissement: Nantes
- Canton: Machecoul-Saint-Même
- Intercommunality: Sud Retz Atlantique

Government
  - Mayor (2020–2026): Christian Gauthier
- Area^{1}: 35.92 km^{2} (13.87 sq mi)
- Population (2023): 2,054
  - Density: 57.18/km^{2} (148.1/sq mi)
- Time zone: UTC+01:00 (CET)
  - Summer (DST): UTC+02:00 (CEST)
- INSEE/Postal code: 44119 /44270
- ^{1} French Land Register data, which excludes lakes, ponds, glaciers > 1 km^{2} (0.386 sq mi or 247 acres) and river estuaries.

Paulx (French pronunciation: [po]; Breton: Palud) is a commune in the Loire-Atlantique department in western France.

== Population ==
Historical population

Year	Pop.	±% p.a.
1800	898	—
1821	1,350	+1.96%
1846	1,815	+1.19%
1872	1,838	+0.05%
1901	1,977	+0.25%
1926	1,627	−0.78%
1946	1,521	−0.34%
1962	1,574	+0.21%
1968	1,516	−0.62%

Year	Pop.	±% p.a.
1975	1,382	−1.31%
1982	1,348	−0.36%
1990	1,311	−0.35%
1999	1,354	+0.36%
2007	1,823	+3.79%
2012	1,938	+1.23%
2017	1,981	+0.44%
2023	2,054	+0.60%

Source: EHESS and INSEE (1968-2023)

== See also ==
- Communes of the Loire-Atlantique department
