= La Marne =

La Marne La Marnn (Gallo) Maeron (Breton)
- Commune
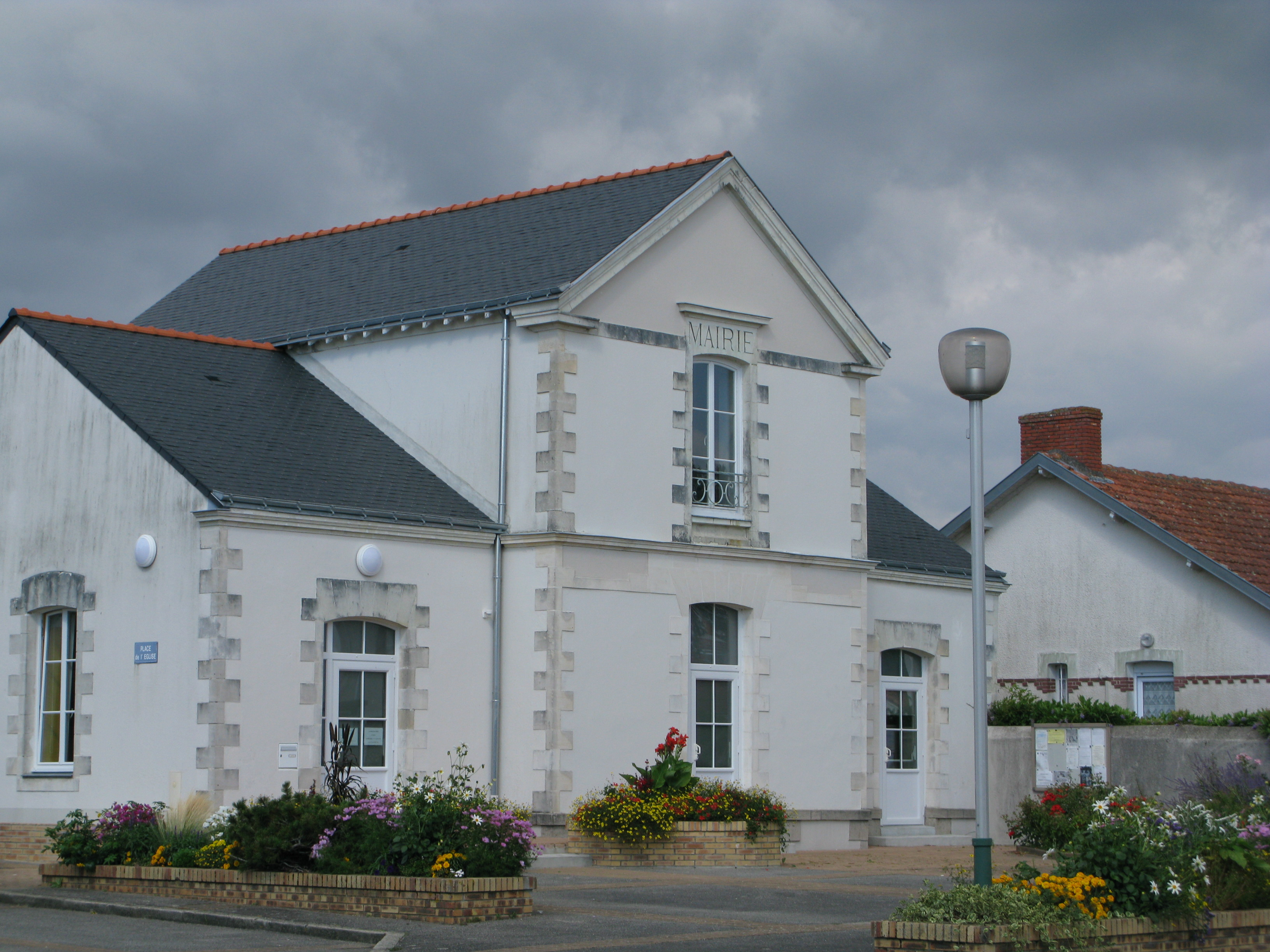
- Town hall

- Coat of arms
- Location of La Marne
- Location within France Location within Pays de la Loire
- Coordinates: 46°59′47″N 1°44′23″W
- Country: France
- Region: Pays de la Loire
- Department: Loire-Atlantique
- Arrondissement: Nantes
- Canton: Machecoul-Saint-Même
- Intercommunality: Sud Retz Atlantique

Government
  - Mayor (2020–2026): Jean-Marie Bruneteau
- Area^{1}: 17.8 km^{2} (6.9 sq mi)
- Elevation: 12 m (39 ft)
- Population (2023): 1,586
  - Density: 89.1/km^{2} (231/sq mi)
- Time zone: UTC+01:00 (CET)
  - Summer (DST): UTC+02:00 (CEST)
- INSEE/Postal code: 44090 /44270
- ^{1} French Land Register data, which excludes lakes, ponds, glaciers > 1 km^{2} (0.386 sq mi or 247 acres) and river estuaries.

La Marne (French pronunciation: [la maʁn]; Gallo: La Marnn, Breton: Maeron) is a commune in the Loire-Atlantique department in western France.

== Population ==
Historical population
Year	Pop.	±% p.a.
1968	788	—
1975	764	−0.44%
1982	798	+0.62%
1990	835	+0.57%
1999	916	+1.03%
2007	1,345	+4.92%
2012	1,367	+0.33%
2017	1,503	+1.91%
2023	1,586	+0.90%
Source: INSEE

== See also ==
- Communes of the Loire-Atlantique department
