= Préfailles =

Préfailles Pradvael
- Commune
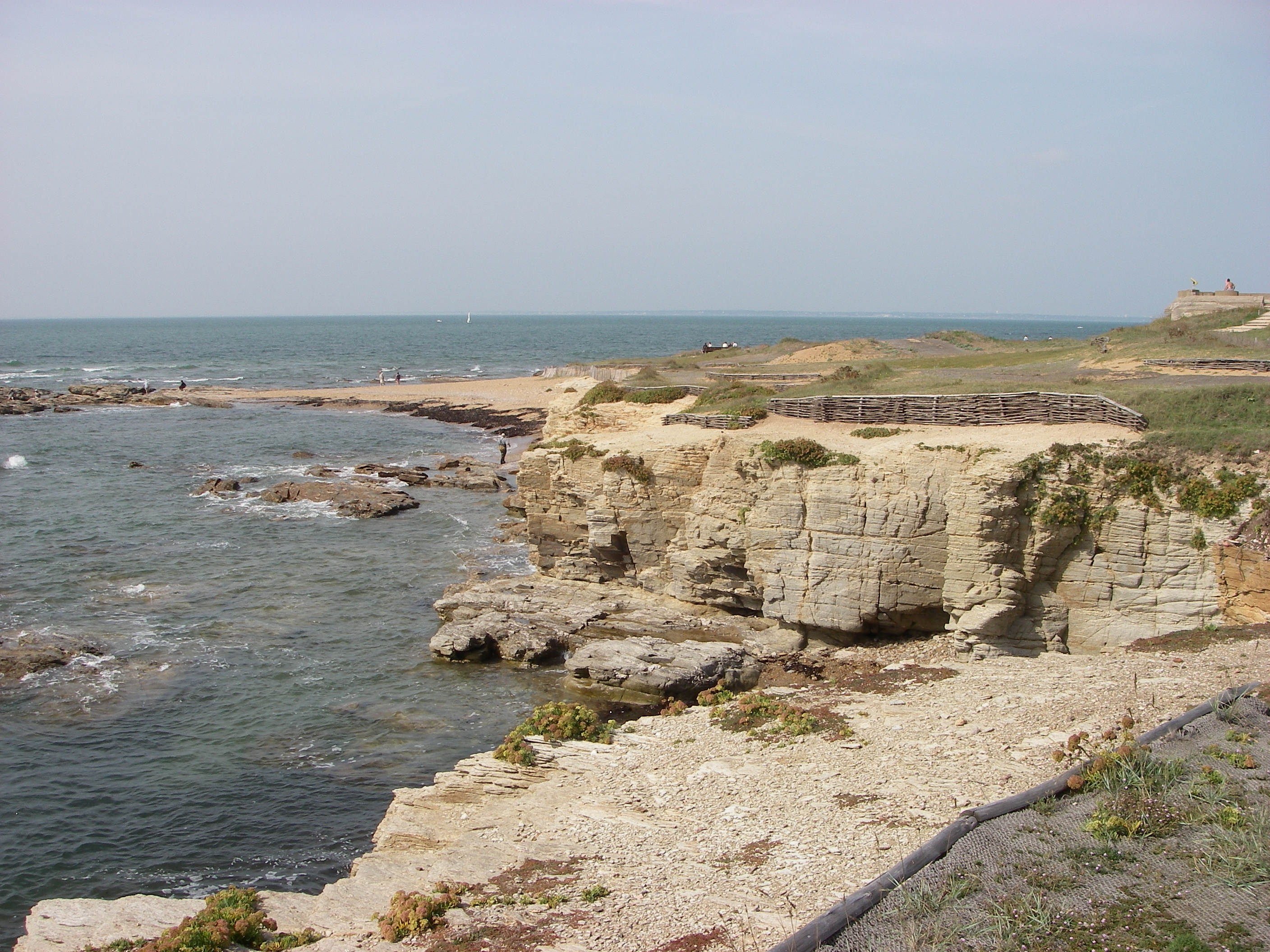
- Saint Gildas Point

- Coat of arms
- Location of Préfailles
- Location within France Location within Pays de la Loire
- Coordinates: 47°08′00″N 2°13′00″W
- Country: France
- Region: Pays de la Loire
- Department: Loire-Atlantique
- Arrondissement: Saint-Nazaire
- Canton: Pornic
- Intercommunality: CA Pornic Agglo Pays de Retz

Government
  - Mayor (2020–2026): Claude Caudal
- Area^{1}: 4.72 km^{2} (1.82 sq mi)
- Highest elevation: 36 m (118 ft)
- Lowest elevation: 0 m (0 ft)
- Population (2023): 1,321
  - Density: 280/km^{2} (725/sq mi)
- Time zone: UTC+01:00 (CET)
  - Summer (DST): UTC+02:00 (CEST)
- INSEE/Postal code: 44136 /44770
- ^{1} French Land Register data, which excludes lakes, ponds, glaciers > 1 km^{2} (0.386 sq mi or 247 acres) and river estuaries.

Préfailles (French pronunciation: [pʁefaj]; Breton: Pradvael) is a commune in the Loire-Atlantique department in western France.

== Population ==
Historical population
Year	Pop.	±% p.a.
1968	601	—
1975	628	+0.63%
1982	775	+3.05%
1990	857	+1.27%
1999	1,038	+2.15%
2007	1,206	+1.89%
2012	1,236	+0.49%
2017	1,246	+0.16%
2023	1,321	+0.98%
Source: INSEE

== See also ==
- Communes of the Loire-Atlantique department
