= La Plaine-sur-Mer =

- Commune
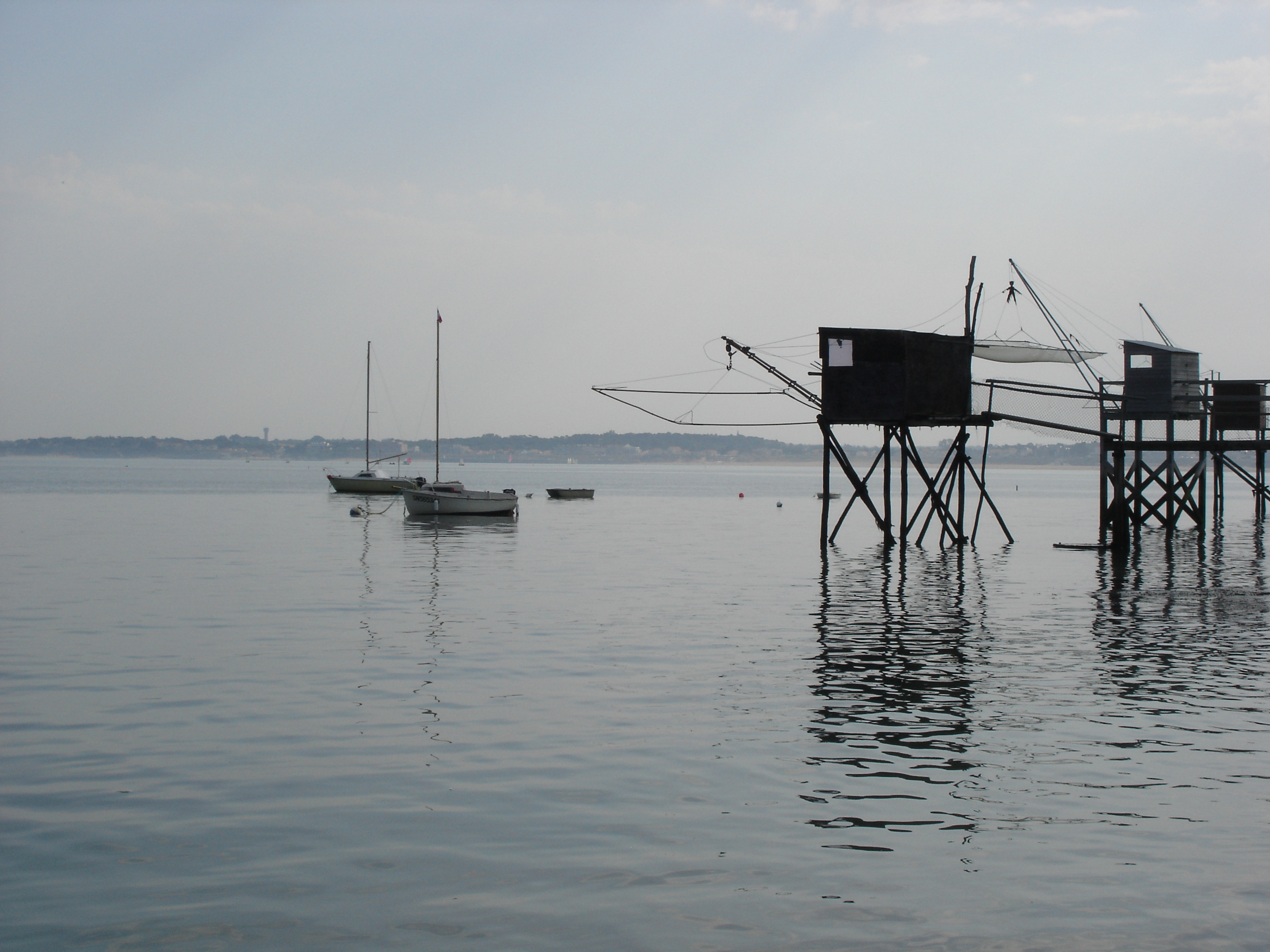
- Fishing huts at Port Giraud

- Coat of arms
- Location of La Plaine-sur-Mer
- Location within France Location within Pays de la Loire
- Coordinates: 47°08′00″N 2°10′00″W
- Country: France
- Region: Pays de la Loire
- Department: Loire-Atlantique
- Arrondissement: Saint-Nazaire
- Canton: Pornic
- Intercommunality: CA Pornic Agglo Pays de Retz

Government
  - Mayor (2020–2026): Séverine Marchand
- Area^{1}: 16.39 km^{2} (6.33 sq mi)
- Highest elevation: 38 m (125 ft)
- Lowest elevation: 0 m (0 ft)
- Population (2023): 4,760
  - Density: 290/km^{2} (752/sq mi)
- Time zone: UTC+01:00 (CET)
  - Summer (DST): UTC+02:00 (CEST)
- INSEE/Postal code: 44126 /44770
- ^{1} French Land Register data, which excludes lakes, ponds, glaciers > 1 km^{2} (0.386 sq mi or 247 acres) and river estuaries.

La Plaine-sur-Mer (French pronunciation: [la plɛn syʁ mɛʁ]; Breton: Plaen-Raez) is a commune in the Loire-Atlantique department in western France.

== Population ==
Historical population

Year	Pop.	±% p.a.
1793	1,420	—
1821	1,202	−0.59%
1846	1,429	+0.69%
1872	1,436	+0.02%
1901	1,614	+0.40%
1926	1,219	−1.12%
1946	1,191	−0.12%
1962	1,475	+1.35%
1968	1,635	+1.73%

Year	Pop.	±% p.a.
1975	1,797	+1.36%
1982	2,006	+1.58%
1990	2,104	+0.60%
1999	2,517	+2.01%
2007	3,610	+4.61%
2012	3,929	+1.71%
2017	4,266	+1.66%
2023	4,760	+1.84%

Source: EHESS and INSEE (1968-2023)

== See also ==
- Communes of the Loire-Atlantique department
