= Canton of Machecoul-Saint-Même =

Coordinates: 46.99°N 1.82°W

The canton of Machecoul-Saint-Même (before 2021: Machecoul) is an administrative division of the Loire-Atlantique department, western France. Its borders were modified at the French canton reorganisation which came into effect in March 2015. Its seat is in Machecoul-Saint-Même.

It consists of the following communes:

1. Chaumes-en-Retz (partly)
2. Cheix-en-Retz
3. Machecoul-Saint-Même
4. La Marne
5. Paulx
6. Port-Saint-Père
7. Rouans
8. Sainte-Pazanne
9. Saint-Étienne-de-Mer-Morte
10. Saint-Hilaire-de-Chaléons
11. Saint-Mars-de-Coutais
12. Villeneuve-en-Retz
13. Vue
