= Cheix-en-Retz =

Cheix-en-Retz Chaèz/Chiz (Gallo) Keiz-Raez (Breton)
- Commune
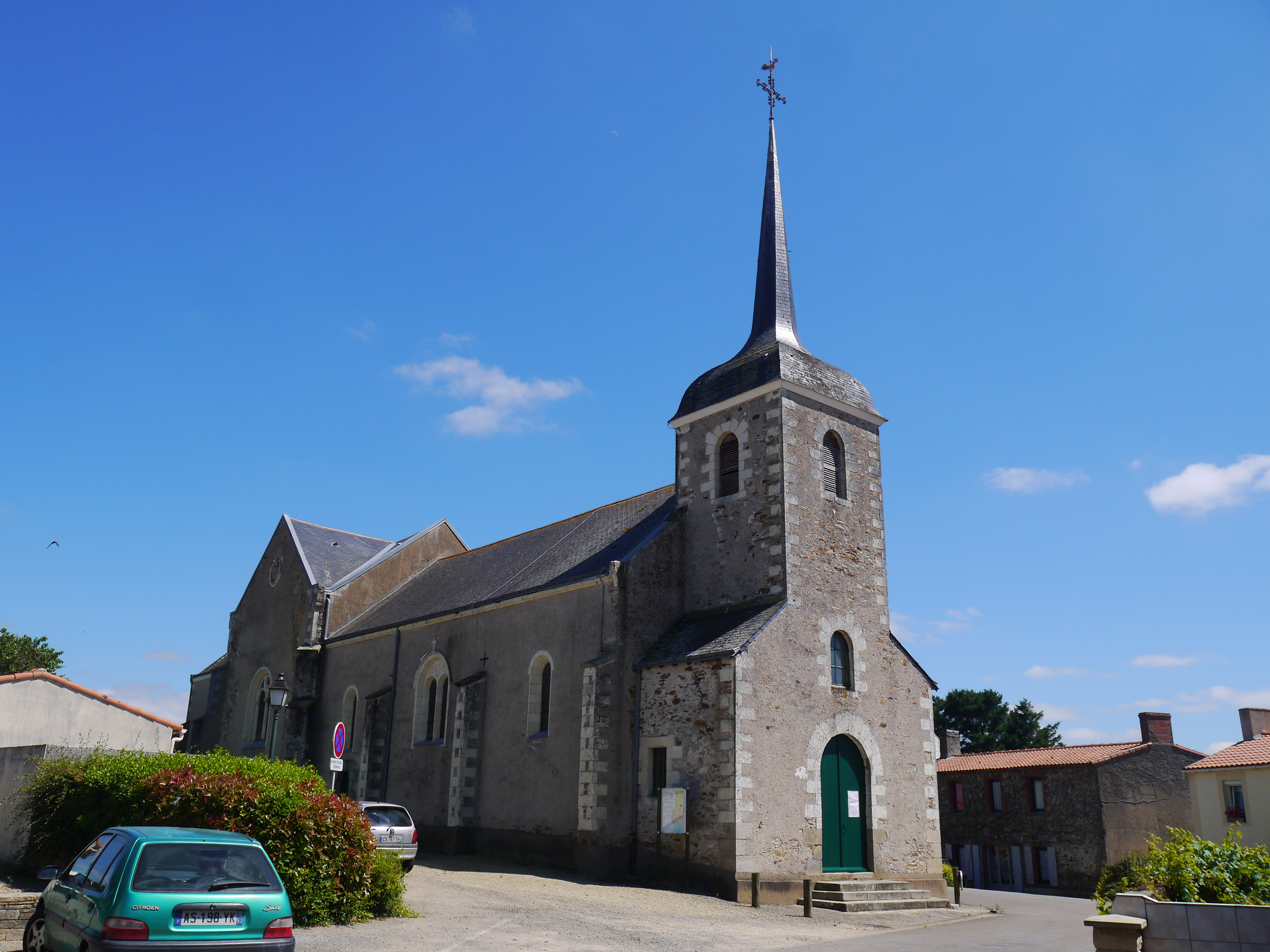

- Coat of arms
- Location of Cheix-en-Retz
- Location within France Location within Pays de la Loire
- Coordinates: 47°10′57″N 1°48′51″W
- Country: France
- Region: Pays de la Loire
- Department: Loire-Atlantique
- Arrondissement: Nantes
- Canton: Machecoul-Saint-Même
- Intercommunality: CA Pornic Agglo Pays de Retz

Government
  - Mayor (2020–2026): Luc Normand
- Area^{1}: 8.34 km^{2} (3.22 sq mi)
- Highest elevation: 27 m (89 ft)
- Lowest elevation: 0 m (0 ft)
- Population (2023): 1,182
  - Density: 142/km^{2} (367/sq mi)
- Time zone: UTC+01:00 (CET)
  - Summer (DST): UTC+02:00 (CEST)
- INSEE/Postal code: 44039 /44640
- ^{1} French Land Register data, which excludes lakes, ponds, glaciers > 1 km^{2} (0.386 sq mi or 247 acres) and river estuaries.

Cheix-en-Retz (French pronunciation: [ʃɛ ɑ̃ ʁɛ], literally Cheix in Retz; Gallo: Chaèz or Chi, Breton: Keiz-Raez) is a commune in the Loire-Atlantique department in western France.

== Population ==
Historical population
Year	Pop.	±% p.a.
1968	308	—
1975	326	+0.81%
1982	367	+1.71%
1990	442	+2.35%
1999	529	+2.02%
2007	721	+3.95%
2012	913	+4.84%
2017	1,067	+3.17%
2023	1,182	+1.72%
Source: INSEE

== See also ==
- Communes of the Loire-Atlantique department
