= Pornic Agglo Pays de Retz =

- Communauté d'agglomération
- Country: France
- Region: Pays de la Loire
- Department: Loire-Atlantique
- No. of communes: {{{nbcomm}}}
- Established: 1 January 2017

Government
  - President (2024–2032): Pascale Briand, DVD
- Area: 522.1 km^{2} (201.6 sq mi)
- Population (2023): 70,563
  - Density: 135.2/km^{2} (350.0/sq mi)
- Website: pornicagglo.fr

Pornic Agglo Pays de Retz is a French agglomeration community, created on 1 January 2017 and located in the Loire-Atlantique department and the Pays de la Loire region.

== Historical ==
After several months of negotiations, the community advisers of the two community of communes of Pornic and Cœur Pays de Retz decided to merge them on 13 June 2016 within an urban community called "Pornic Agglo Pays de Retz".

The agglomeration community was created on 1 January 2017 by prefectural decree of 9 November 2016. On 5 January 2017, during its inaugural meeting, the community council elected the mayor of Pornic, Jean-Michel Brard, as president of the agglomeration community. In 2024, Pascale Briand was elected as president of Pornic Agglo Pays de Retz and was subsequently relected on 6 April 2026 following the 2026 Municipales elections.

On 1 January 2020, the municipality of Villeneuve-en-Retz left the communauté de communes Sud Retz Atlantique and joined Pornic Agglo Pays de Retz.

== Community territory ==
=== Geography ===
Located in the southwestern department of Loire-Atlantique, Pornic intercommunal Agglo Retz includes 15 towns and has an area of 522.1 km^{2} (201.6 sq mi).

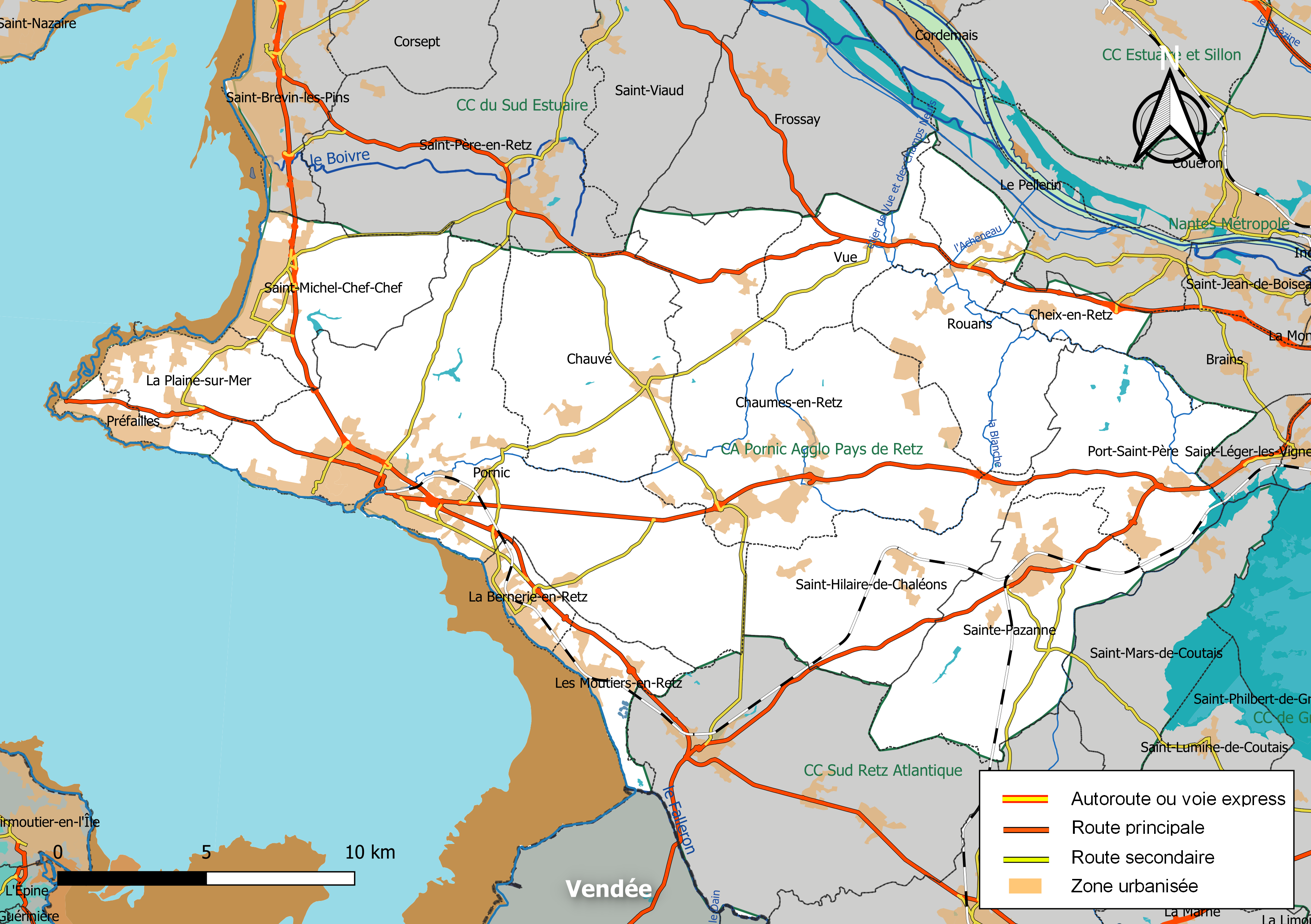
Map of the intercommunalité Pornic Agglo Pays de Retz on 1 January 2019.

=== Composition ===
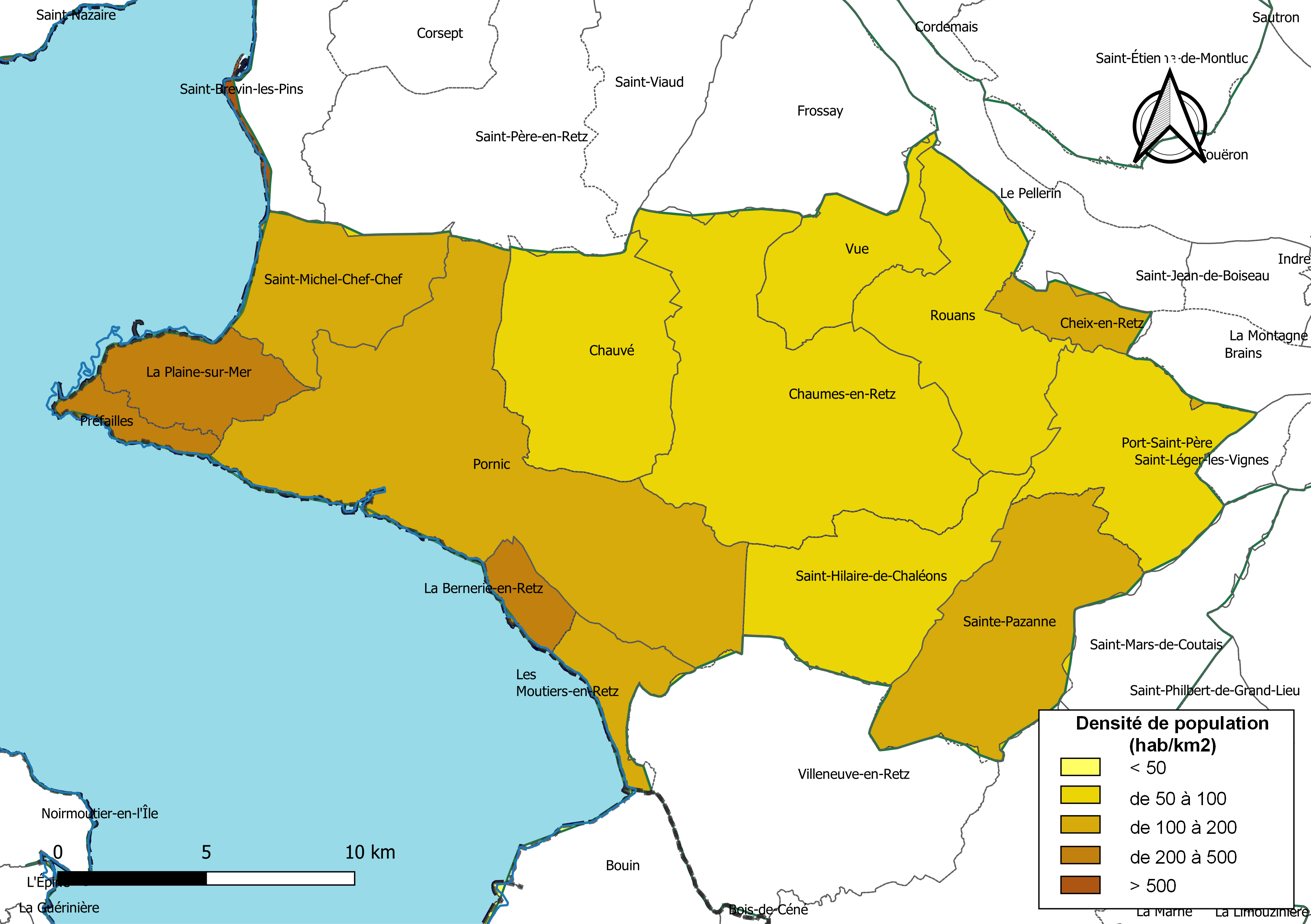
Map of population densities (2016 vintage) of the municipalities of the intercommunality Pornic Agglo Pays de Retz. Composition in municipalities on 1 January 2019. (Note: The population densities are calculated automatically in a Geographic information system (GIS) using the geometric surface of the municipality, with a level of precision of the contour of 5 m as it emerges from the export of the division administrative at municipal level (outlines of municipalities) from OpenStreetMap, and not the cadastral area defined by INSEE, which is purely administrative data. Class differences may thus possibly appear for municipalities that are at the limit of crossing the class threshold.)

The agglomeration community includes 15 municipalities:

List of inter-municipal municipalities
name	INSEE code	Inhabitants	Area (km^{2})	Population (last legal pop. )	Density ( inhab./km^{2} )
Pornic (headquarters)	44131	Pornicais	94,18	15 570 (2018)	165
La Bernerie-en-Retz	44012	Bernerians	6,093	3,016 (2018)	495
Chaumes-en-Retz	44005	Calmetiens	76,556	6,827 (2018)	89
Chauvé	44038	Chauvéens	40,98	2,892 (2018)	71
Cheix-en-Retz	44039	Cheixois	8,34	1,086 (2018)	130
Les Moutiers-en-Retz	44106	Monastériens	9,58	1,703 (2018)	178
La Plaine-sur-Mer	44126	Plainais	16,39	4,369 (2018)	267
Port-Saint-Père	44133	Port-Saint-Périns	32,57	2,911 (2018)	89
Préfailles	44136	Préfaillais	4,88	1,242 (2018)	255
Rouans	44145	Rouansais	37,73	3,015 (2018)	80
Saint-Hilaire-de-Chaléons	44164	Chaléonnais	34,98	2,304 (2018)	66
Saint-Michel-Chef-Chef	44182	Michelois	25,12	5,173 (2018)	206
Sainte-Pazanne	44186	Pazennais	41,56	6,889 (2018)	166
Villeneuve-en-Retz	44021	Villeretziens	73,68	4,911 (2018)	67
Vue	44220	Véziens	19,51	1,626 (2018)	83

=== Demography ===
Historical population
Year	Pop.	±% p.a.
1968	29,501	—
1975	30,511	+0.48%
1982	33,409	+1.30%
1990	35,964	+0.93%
1999	41,676	+1.65%
2007	52,602	+2.95%
2012	57,301	+1.73%
2017	62,330	+1.70%
2023	70,563	+2.09%
The data mentioned above are established on a constant geographical scope, in the geography in force at 1 January 2023. Source: INSEE

== Administration ==
=== Seat ===
The headquarters of the urban community is in Pornic, 2 rue du Docteur Ange Guépin.

=== Political trends ===
Mayors of the intercommunality ( 1 July 2021)
Commune	Mayor	Etiquette (Party)
Chaumes-en-Retz	Jacky Drouet	DVG
Chauvé	Pierre Martin	DVD
Cheix-en-Retz	Luc Normand	DVD
La Bernerie-en-Retz	Hubert Tregou	SE
La Plaine-sur-Mer	Séverine Marchand	SE
Les Moutiers-en-Retz	Pascale Briand	LR
Pornic	Antoine Hubert	DVC
Port-Saint-Père	Gaëtan Léauté	DVD
Préfailles	Claude Caudal	DVG
Rouans	Cyril Favreau	SE
Saint-Hilaire-de-Chaléons	Françoise Rousseau	SE
Saint-Michel-Chef-Chef	Maxime Leroux Rondineau	SE
Sainte-Pazanne	Bruno Clavier	SE
Villeneuve-en-Retz	Yves Blanchard	SE
Vue	Nadège Placé	SE

=== Community council ===
The 42 permanent advisers are thus distributed according to common law as follows:

Number of delegates	Communes
11	Pornic
5	Chaumes-en-Retz
4	Sainte-Pazanne
3	La Plaine-sur-Mer, Saint-Michel-Chef-Chef, Villeneuve-en-Retz
2	Chauvé, La Bernerie-en-Retz, Port-Saint-Père, Rouans
1	Cheix-en-Retz, Les Moutiers-en-Retz, Préfailles, Saint-Hilaire-de-Chaléons, Vue

=== Elections ===
The agglomeration community is administered by its community council made up in 2020 of 42 community councillors, who are municipal councillors representing each of the member municipalities.

=== List of presidents ===
List of successive presidents
Period		Name	Etiquette	Capacity
5 January 2017	16 July 2024	Jean-Michel Brard	DVD	Mayor of Pornic
17 July 2024	2032	Pascale Briand	Les Républicains	Mayor of Les Moutiers-en-Retz

=== Powers ===
The intercommunality exercises the powers which have been transferred to it by the member municipalities, under the conditions defined by the general code of local authorities .

=== Tax regime and budget ===
The agglomeration community is a public establishment of inter-municipal cooperation with its own tax system.

In order to finance the exercise of its powers, the intercommunality collects the single professional tax [ 3 ] (FPU) - which succeeded the single professional tax (TPU) - and ensures an equalization of resources between the residential municipalities and those with of activity zones.

=== Workforce ===
In order to implement its obligations, the inter-municipal association employs 200 agents.
