= Canton of Pornic =

Coordinates: 47.12°N 2.10°W

The canton of Pornic is an administrative division of the Loire-Atlantique department, western France. Its borders were modified at the French canton reorganisation which came into effect in March 2015. Its seat is in Pornic.

It consists of the following communes:

1. La Bernerie-en-Retz
2. Chaumes-en-Retz (partly)
3. Chauvé
4. Les Moutiers-en-Retz
5. La Plaine-sur-Mer
6. Pornic
7. Préfailles
8. Saint-Michel-Chef-Chef
