= Vue, Loire-Atlantique =

Vue Gwagenez (Breton)
- Commune
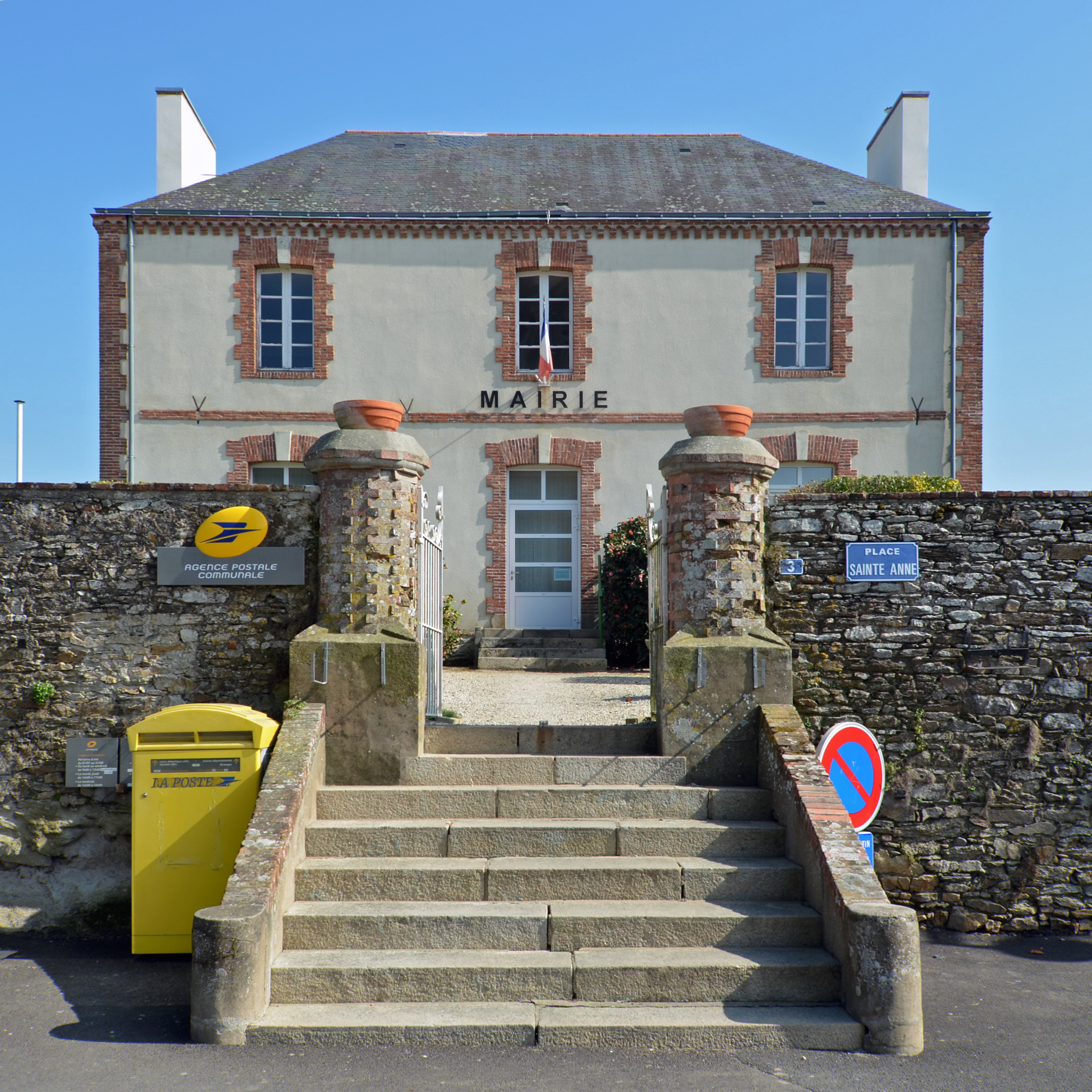
- The town hall in Vue

- Coat of arms
- Location of Vue
- Location within France Location within Pays de la Loire
- Coordinates: 47°11′58″N 1°52′47″W
- Country: France
- Region: Pays de la Loire
- Department: Loire-Atlantique
- Arrondissement: Nantes
- Canton: Machecoul-Saint-Même
- Intercommunality: Pornic Agglo Pays de Retz

Government
  - Mayor (2020–2026): Nadège Placé
- Area^{1}: 19.51 km^{2} (7.53 sq mi)
- Highest elevation: 60 m (200 ft)
- Lowest elevation: 0 m (0 ft)
- Population (2023): 1,753
  - Density: 89.85/km^{2} (232.7/sq mi)
- Demonym(s): Veuzéennes, Veuzéens
- Time zone: UTC+01:00 (CET)
  - Summer (DST): UTC+02:00 (CEST)
- INSEE/Postal code: 44220 /44640
- Website: http://www.mairie-vue.fr/
- ^{1} French Land Register data, which excludes lakes, ponds, glaciers > 1 km^{2} (0.386 sq mi or 247 acres) and river estuaries.

Vue (French pronunciation: [vy]; Breton: Gwagenez) is a commune in the Loire-Atlantique department in western France.

== Population ==
Historical population
Year	Pop.	±% p.a.
1968	772	—
1975	743	−0.55%
1982	784	+0.77%
1990	887	+1.55%
1999	995	+1.28%
2007	1,323	+3.63%
2012	1,488	+2.38%
2017	1,638	+1.94%
2023	1,753	+1.14%
Source: INSEE

== See also ==
- Communes of the Loire-Atlantique department
