= Pornic =

Pornic Port-Nitz (Gallo) Pornizh (Breton)
- Commune
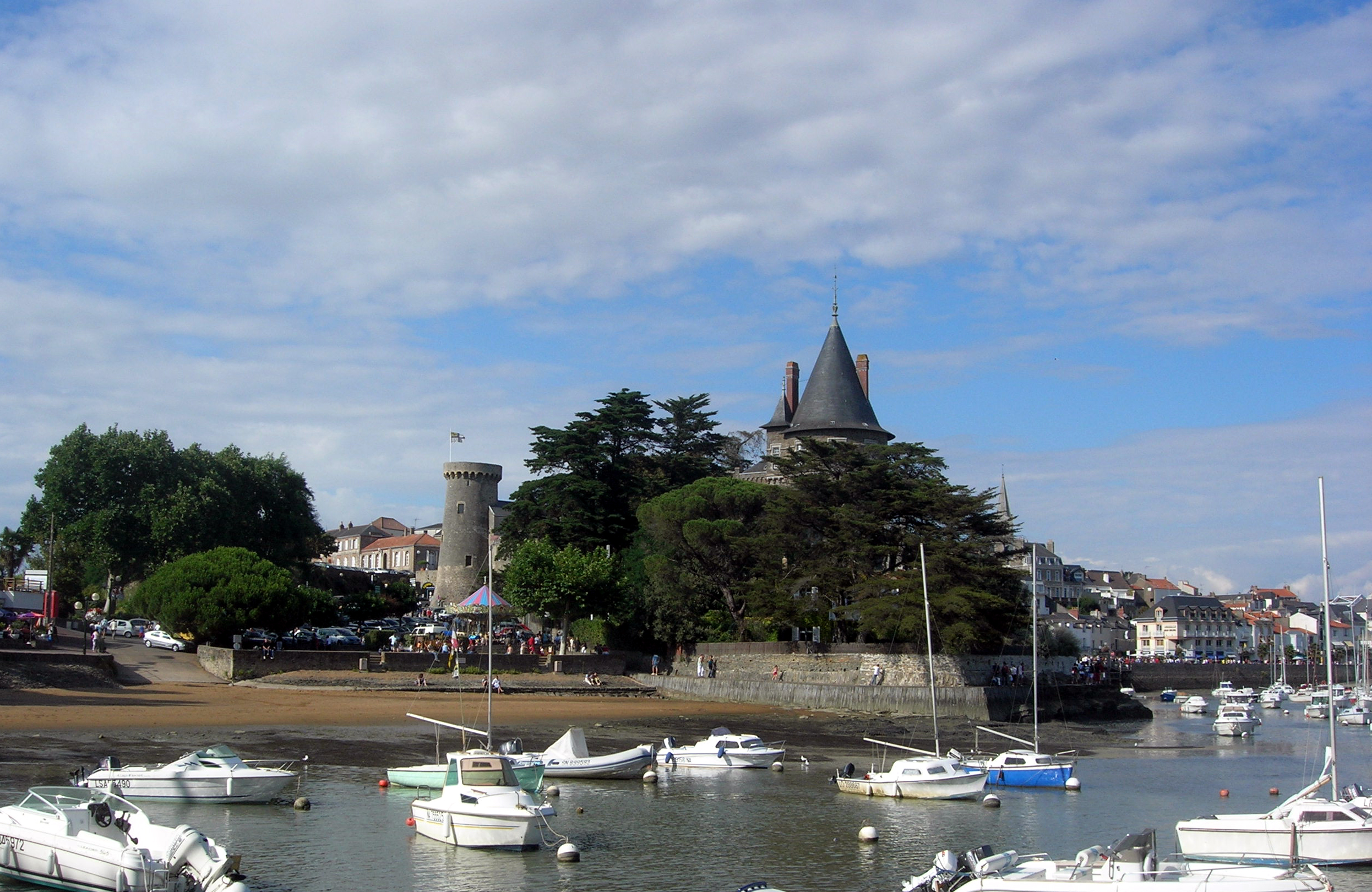
- Castle of Pornic and the port

- Coat of arms
- Location of Pornic
- Location within France Location within Pays de la Loire
- Coordinates: 47°07′00″N 2°06′00″W
- Country: France
- Region: Pays de la Loire
- Department: Loire-Atlantique
- Arrondissement: Saint-Nazaire
- Canton: Pornic
- Intercommunality: CA Pornic Agglo Pays de Retz
- Boroughs: Sainte-Marie-sur-Mer, Clion-sur-Mer

Government
  - Mayor (2026–32): Antoine Hubert
- Area^{1}: 94.2 km^{2} (36.4 sq mi)
- Highest elevation: 31 m (102 ft)
- Lowest elevation: 0 m (0 ft)
- Population (2023): 18,745
  - Density: 199/km^{2} (515/sq mi)
- Demonym: Pornicais (French)
- Time zone: UTC+01:00 (CET)
  - Summer (DST): UTC+02:00 (CEST)
- INSEE/Postal code: 44131 /44210
- ^{1} French Land Register data, which excludes lakes, ponds, glaciers > 1 km^{2} (0.386 sq mi or 247 acres) and river estuaries.

Pornic (French pronunciation: [pɔʁnik]; Pornizh in Breton, Port-Nitz in Gallo) is a commune in the Loire-Atlantique department in western France.

In 1973 the commune of Pornic absorbed the neighbouring municipalities of Sainte-Marie-sur-Mer and Clion-sur-Mer.

== History ==
=== Prehistory and Antiquity ===
The discovery of bifaces and a polished stone axe places the first human presence on the commune's territory at approximately 100,000 years BCE. The megaliths still visible in the early 21st century, including an important group of transept-type corridor dolmens, attest to human settlement of the Pornic site in the 5th millennium BC.

=== Middle Ages ===
In the 9th century, Pornic was part of the County of Herbauges, a military grouping of parishes and villages in lower Poitou fighting against Viking invasions. In 851, the King of Brittany, Erispoë, and the King of France, Charles the Bald, signed the Treaty of Angers, which allowed the Bretons to expand their territory by occupying the Rennes region, Nantes region and Pays de Retz.

In the 10th century, the Duke of Brittany Alan Barbe-Torte erected a fortress in the Pornic valley to protect the town from the Vikings. Later it became one of the residences of Gilles de Rais, a character who inspired the tale of Bluebeard.

=== French Revolution ===
During the French Revolution, a significant portion of Pornic's inhabitants favoured the Republic. On 23 March 1793, the National Guard, composed of 400 men led by a priest who called himself a "republican priest", left the town to recover wheat. Royalist troops (the "whites") took advantage of this to seize the town. However, the insurgents, having achieved victory, became intoxicated, which allowed the republicans to retake the town. On 27 March 1793, insurgents led by Charette captured the town, pillaged it and set fire to houses suspected of sheltering republicans. A month later, Charette evacuated Pornic in the face of the threat from Republican General Beysser.

=== 19th and 20th centuries ===
In the 19th century, the rise of Pornic as a seaside resort led to the arrival of the railway in 1875 and the inauguration of the station, following the construction of the Nantes-Sainte-Pazanne-Pornic line. In 1853, Pornic inaugurated one of the first casinos in France (fifth after Dieppe, Boulogne-sur-Mer, Saint-Malo, and Trouville). In 1906, the narrow-gauge Pornic–Paimbœuf railway was inaugurated, serving holiday resorts along the Jade Coast; the service ended in 1939.

During this period, numerous artists frequented Pornic: writers such as Gustave Flaubert, Paul Léautaud, Jules Michelet, Robert Browning and Julien Gracq. Many painters were also inspired by this town and its surroundings, including Pierre-Auguste Renoir, Edgar Maxence, Henri Lebasque, and Max Ernst.

Pornic was the home port of the Saint-Philibert, a steamer built in 1926 by the Dubigeon workshops. It sank on 14 June 1931 near the Châtelier buoy in Bourgneuf Bay, killing nearly 500 people.

During World War II, on 17 June 1940, the troopship RMS Lancastria was sunk by German aviation. A portion of the 4,000 to 7,000 dead are buried in Pornic's English cemetery. The town was occupied by the Wehrmacht on 26 June. Many fortifications were built in Pornic as part of the construction of the Atlantic Wall. The German occupation continued from August 1944 to 11 May 1945, lasting nine months longer than in most of western France, as Pornic was located in the German St. Nazaire Pocket, whose effective surrender occurred three days after Germany's capitulation.

Pornic merged with Clion-sur-Mer and Sainte-Marie-sur-Mer on 1 June 1973.

== Economy ==
=== Tourism ===
Pornic is a popular seaside resort on the Atlantic coast. As of 1 January 2011, the town had six hotels (one 1-star, three 2-star and two 3-star), offering 282 rooms, and nine camping grounds with 1,607 spaces.

The town is known for its faience factory, casino, thalassotherapy centre, 18-hole golf course, and strawberry farm (La Fraiseraie).

=== Ports ===
The town has two ports dedicated to recreational boating: the departmental port of Gourmalon with 350 moorings, and the Noëveillard marina, also called the "Yacht Club International de Pornic" (YCIP), which has 919 berths for boats from 6 to 25 metres (20 to 82 ft).

While the fishing port remains active, commercial fishing activity is modest compared to the past, with the fleet catching approximately 50 tonnes of seafood products per year.

=== Industry ===
Notable industries include the Faïencerie de Pornic (Pornic Faience Factory), founded in 1947 by Émile Dryander. As of 2011, it produced 600,000 units annually and employed 26 people. The town is also home to the factory producing Le Curé Nantais cheese, located in Pornic since 1987.

== Heritage ==
=== Architecture ===
==== Château de Pornic ====
The Château de Pornic was built between the 13th and 15th centuries and modified in the 19th century. The oldest part is the north tower, which is topped with machicolations. The buildings at the centre of the fortress were modified in the 15th century, when the south tower was built. The castle successively belonged to Gilles de Rais, John V, Duke of Brittany, and the Coétivy, Gondy, Villeroy and Brie-Serrant families. It was bought by local authorities in 1824.

==== Other buildings ====
The Manor of La Touche, dating from the Renaissance (16th century), regularly hosted Jules Michelet from 1853 onwards, where he wrote part of his History of the French Revolution. He also wrote The Sea there in 1861.

The market halls, owned by the town since 1825, date from the 18th century, when the Duke of Villeroy and Retz decided to replace the first building erected by order of Duke Henri de Gondi in 1609.

The railway station (Nantes-Sainte-Pazanne-Pornic line) dates from 1875.

=== Religious heritage ===
The Church of Clion dates from the 13th or early 14th century and was renovated in the 17th and 19th centuries. Its bell tower, a porch tower, has a mechanical carillon from 1857 that can ring a complete octave.

Only vestiges remain of the former Sainte-Marie Abbey in the presbytery of the former commune of Sainte-Marie-sur-Mer, where the Church of Sainte-Marie, in neo-Gothic style, dates from the late 19th century and contains a tombstone from the 14th century.

The Church of Saint-Gilles in Pornic, the third built since the origin, dates from the late 19th century.

The Chapel of Notre-Dame de Gourmalon was inaugurated in 1909, built despite opposition from the clergy by local residents who found the town church too far away.

=== War cemetery ===
The Pornic War Cemetery (English cemetery) was opened to allow the burial of victims of the sinking of the RMS Lancastria, torpedoed on 17 June 1940. Half of the 399 graves at the site concern victims of this event.

=== Coat of arms ===
Since the merger of the communes of Pornic, Clion-sur-Mer and Sainte-Marie-sur-Mer, the town has adopted a new coat of arms that incorporates the respective arms of the three communes. The anchor, cannon and star evoke the lugger La Belle Étoile captured by the Commodore Warren in 1800. The ermine spots evoke Brittany's traditional ermine pattern. The design was created by Romuald Renaud in 2010.

== Population ==
Historical population

| Year | Pop. | ±% p.a. |
|---|---|---|
| 1793 | 948 | — |
| 1800 | 806 | −2.29% |
| 1806 | 834 | +0.57% |
| 1821 | 1,040 | +1.48% |
| 1831 | 1,106 | +0.62% |
| 1841 | 1,324 | +1.82% |
| 1846 | 1,505 | +2.60% |
| 1851 | 1,497 | −0.11% |
| 1856 | 1,494 | −0.04% |
| 1861 | 1,608 | +1.48% |
| 1866 | 1,630 | +0.27% |
| 1872 | 1,732 | +1.02% |
| 1876 | 1,666 | −0.97% |
| 1881 | 1,809 | +1.66% |
| 1886 | 1,919 | +1.19% |
| 1891 | 1,980 | +0.63% |
| 1896 | 2,017 | +0.37% |
| 1901 | 2,034 | +0.17% |

| Year | Pop. | ±% p.a. |
|---|---|---|
| 1906 | 2,004 | −0.30% |
| 1911 | 2,101 | +0.95% |
| 1921 | 1,957 | −0.71% |
| 1926 | 2,001 | +0.45% |
| 1931 | 1,910 | −0.93% |
| 1936 | 2,015 | +1.08% |
| 1946 | 2,358 | +1.58% |
| 1954 | 2,460 | +0.53% |
| 1962 | 2,759 | +1.44% |
| 1968 | 2,795 | +0.22% |
| 1975 | 8,154 | +16.53% |
| 1982 | 8,704 | +0.94% |
| 1990 | 9,815 | +1.51% |
| 1999 | 11,903 | +2.17% |
| 2007 | 13,906 | +1.96% |
| 2012 | 13,937 | +0.04% |
| 2017 | 15,018 | +1.51% |
| 2023 | 18,745 | +3.76% |

Source: EHESS and INSEE (1968-2023)

== Breton language ==
The municipality launched a linguistic plan through Ya d'ar brezhoneg on 1 March 2006.

== Transport ==
The Pornic train station is served by trains to Nantes and Sainte-Pazanne.

== Twin towns ==
- Scalby, North Yorkshire, United Kingdom - since 1989
- Linz am Rhein, Germany - since 1995
- Baiona, Spain - since 1995
- Omegna, Italy - since 2021-2024

== Notable people ==
- Vladimir Lenin (1870–1924), future founder of the Soviet Union, spent a month of rest in Pornic from 22 July to 23 August 1910, with his wife Nadezhda Krupskaya and mother-in-law, staying at the villa Ker les Roses at 3, rue Mondésir.
- Albert Camus (1913–1960) resided at the Château des Brefs, property of the Gallimard family, between 1942 and 1947, where he wrote The Plague.
- Max Ernst (1891–1976), painter, stayed in the town where he developed his frottage technique.
- Pierre-Auguste Renoir (1841–1919) visited Pornic in August and September 1892, where he painted four canvases including White Sail and Beach at Pornic.

== Climate ==
Pornic has a Csb type climate (Mediterranean with mild summers). The highest temperature recorded in Pornic is 38.1 °C on 4 August 2003, while the lowest temperature was -11.2 °C on 2 February 1986. Pornic's average temperature between 1971 and 2000 is approximately 12.8 °C.

Pornic

Climate chart (precipitation, max. and min. temperature)
| J | F | M | A | M | J | J | A | S | O | N | D |
| 72 9 4 | 66 10 4 | 51 13 6 | 48 15 7 | 55 19 10 | 36 22 13 | 34 24 15 | 27 25 15 | 64 22 13 | 79 17 10 | 85 13 7 | 78 10 5 |
- █ Average max. and min. temperatures in °C
- █ Precipitation totals in mm
Imperial conversion
| J | F | M | A | M | J | J | A | S | O | N | D |
| 2.8 48 39 | 2.6 50 39 | 2 55 42 | 1.9 59 44 | 2.2 65 50 | 1.4 71 55 | 1.3 76 59 | 1.1 76 59 | 2.5 71 55 | 3.1 63 50 | 3.3 55 44 | 3.1 49 41 |
- █ Average max. and min. temperatures in °F
- █ Precipitation totals in inches

== See also ==
- Communes of the Loire-Atlantique department
- Sainte-Marie-sur-Mer
