= Pays de Retz =

Historical subregion of France

Coordinates: 47.08°N 1.78°W

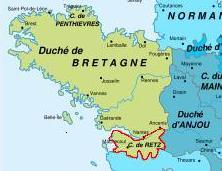
location of the Pays de Retz, south of the Loire in the Duchy of Brittany.

The Pays de Retz (French pronunciation: [pei də ʁɛ]; Breton: Bro-Raez; lit. 'Land of Retz') is a historical subregion of France that currently forms part of the Loire-Atlantique department, but once formed part of the Duchy of Brittany.

The area lies between the southern shore of the Loire estuary and the Marais breton (Breton marshlands), bordered to the west by the Baie de Bourgneuf (Bourgneuf Bay) and to the east by the Lac de Grand-Lieu (Grand-Lieu Lake) and a network of small rivers. Its main towns are Rezé (its capital and the see of the Catholic Diocese of Rezé from 510 to 851), Pornic, Paimbœuf, and Machecoul (another historical capital).

== History ==
Flag of Pays de Retz

In the early 9th century, the area formed part of Frankish territory, but was coveted by the Breton ruler Nominoe. Nominoe and his son Erispoe won a series of victories over the Franks between 843 and 851, resulting in the Treaty of Angers (851) between Charles the Bald and Erispoe, which gave "Ratense" or Pays de Retz to Brittany.

In later centuries, Brittany and Anjou clashed over the area. The notorious medieval serial killer Baron Gilles de Rais was from the area and sexually assaulted and tortured a large number of local peasant children before murdering them.

During the War in the Vendée of 1793, the area was a Royalist stronghold.

The Lordship of Retz became a Duchy in 1581 (see also Seigneurs and Dukes of Retz).

== Literature ==
- Dominique Biron, Elizabeth Brisson, Dominique et Joseph Péroys, "Contes de la Voisine. Seize contes populaires en parler du Pays de Retz", Séquences, 1990
- Le Patrimoine des communes de la Loire-Atlantique, éditions Flohic, 2001
- Gilles Perraudeau, "Contes populaires du Pays de Retz", éd. du Pays de Retz, 1982
