= Brains, Loire-Atlantique =

Brains Brâin/Brein (Gallo) Brenn (Breton)
- Commune
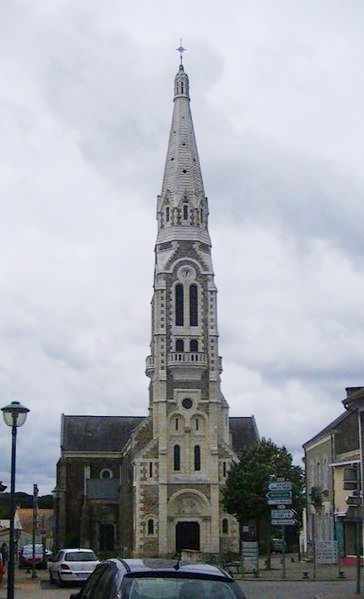

- Coat of arms
- Location of Brains
- Location within France Location within Pays de la Loire
- Coordinates: 47°10′12″N 1°43′14″W
- Country: France
- Region: Pays de la Loire
- Department: Loire-Atlantique
- Arrondissement: Nantes
- Canton: Rezé-1
- Intercommunality: Nantes Métropole

Government
  - Mayor (2020–2026): Laure Beslier
- Area^{1}: 15.31 km^{2} (5.91 sq mi)
- Highest elevation: 34 m (112 ft)
- Lowest elevation: 0 m (0 ft)
- Population (2023): 2,709
  - Density: 176.9/km^{2} (458.3/sq mi)
- Time zone: UTC+01:00 (CET)
  - Summer (DST): UTC+02:00 (CEST)
- INSEE/Postal code: 44024 /44830
- ^{1} French Land Register data, which excludes lakes, ponds, glaciers > 1 km^{2} (0.386 sq mi or 247 acres) and river estuaries.

Brains (French pronunciation: [bʁɛ̃]; Gallo: Brâin or Brein, Breton: Brenn) is a commune in the Loire-Atlantique department in the Pays de la Loire region in western France. The commune is a part of historical Brittany, in the traditional region of Retz, and in the historical region of Nantes.

== Geography ==
Location of the commune of Brains in the Loire-Atlantique department

Brains is located between the Loire and Lac de Grand-Lieu, 18 km southwest of Nantes and 4 km northwest of Bouaye. The commune is bordered on the southwest by the river Acheneau. Neighbouring communes are Le Pellerin, Cheix-en-Retz, Port-Saint-Père, Saint-Léger-des-Vignes, Bouaye, Bouguenais, La Montagne and Saint-Jean-de-Boiseau.

According to the classification established by INSEE in 2020, Brains is a rural commune which is a part of the functional urban area of Nantes.

== Etymology ==
The Gaulish root Nemus Brenno (forest of Brenno) is mentioned in a document of the cartulary of Buzay around 1179.

== History ==
Most of the territory of the commune, covered by a vast forest, belonged during the Ancien Régime to the Dukes of Brittany. Settlements in the area gave birth to a number of lordships with some measure of authority: Jasson, Le Plessis, Le Pesle, Lorière, La Sauvagerie, La Pilaudière and La Guerche. The lordship of Le Pesle, the most important, was originally an appanage of Briord. Today a private residence, it overlooks the Acheneau on the Cour du Pesle.

The château of Le Plessis was the property of Pierre-Suzanne Lucas de La Championnière, lieutenant of François de Charette during the War in the Vendée from 1793-1796.

The château of La Guerche was dependent on Le Pesle until the 17th century. Jules Verne was welcomed there by his uncle Prudent Allotte de la Fuye, owner from 1828 to 1837, during his summer vacations. He wrote some impromptu poetry there.

The church was constructed in 1875 on the site of an older church dating from 1676. The clock tower, with a height of 50 metres, dates from 1901.

The rectory was sold as national property during the Revolution, and is now "l'espace des Clos Mâts", a cultural site with a library and music.

At the end of the 19th century, there were six windmills, of which only those of Charbonnières, Le Breuil, La Fouelle, and La Roche du Gré now survive.

The Napoleonic cadastre denoted a rural territory dotted by villages which are still visible today.

Port Hamoneau saw economic importance until 1914 for the export of wine and red sand to Nantes along the Acheneau River. The city now serves as a destination for hikers and anglers who fish in the surrounding marshes.

== List of mayors ==
List of successive mayors
Term	Name
1968–1977	François Charpentier
1977–1983	Joseph Albert
1983–2014	Jean-Pierre Legendre
2014–incumbent	Laure Beslier

== Transport ==
Brains is serviced by the number 88 Semitan bus, linking the town to the terminus (Neustrie) of Line 3 of the Nantes Tramway.

== Population ==
Historical population

Year	Pop.	±% p.a.
1793	1,096	—
1821	893	−0.73%
1846	1,116	+0.90%
1872	1,124	+0.03%
1901	1,150	+0.08%
1926	1,111	−0.14%
1946	1,041	−0.32%
1962	999	−0.26%
1968	1,021	+0.36%

Year	Pop.	±% p.a.
1975	1,174	+2.01%
1982	1,578	+4.32%
1990	1,889	+2.27%
1999	2,172	+1.56%
2007	2,523	+1.89%
2012	2,587	+0.50%
2017	2,840	+1.88%
2023	2,709	−0.78%

Source: EHESS and INSEE (1968-2023)

== Personalities ==
Jules Verne visited Brains many times, at La Guerche, the house of his uncle, and at Le Plessis.

== See also ==
- Communes of the Loire-Atlantique department
