= Gros-plant-du-pays-nantais =

Wine produced in Loire-Atlantique, France

Pays nantais
- Wine region
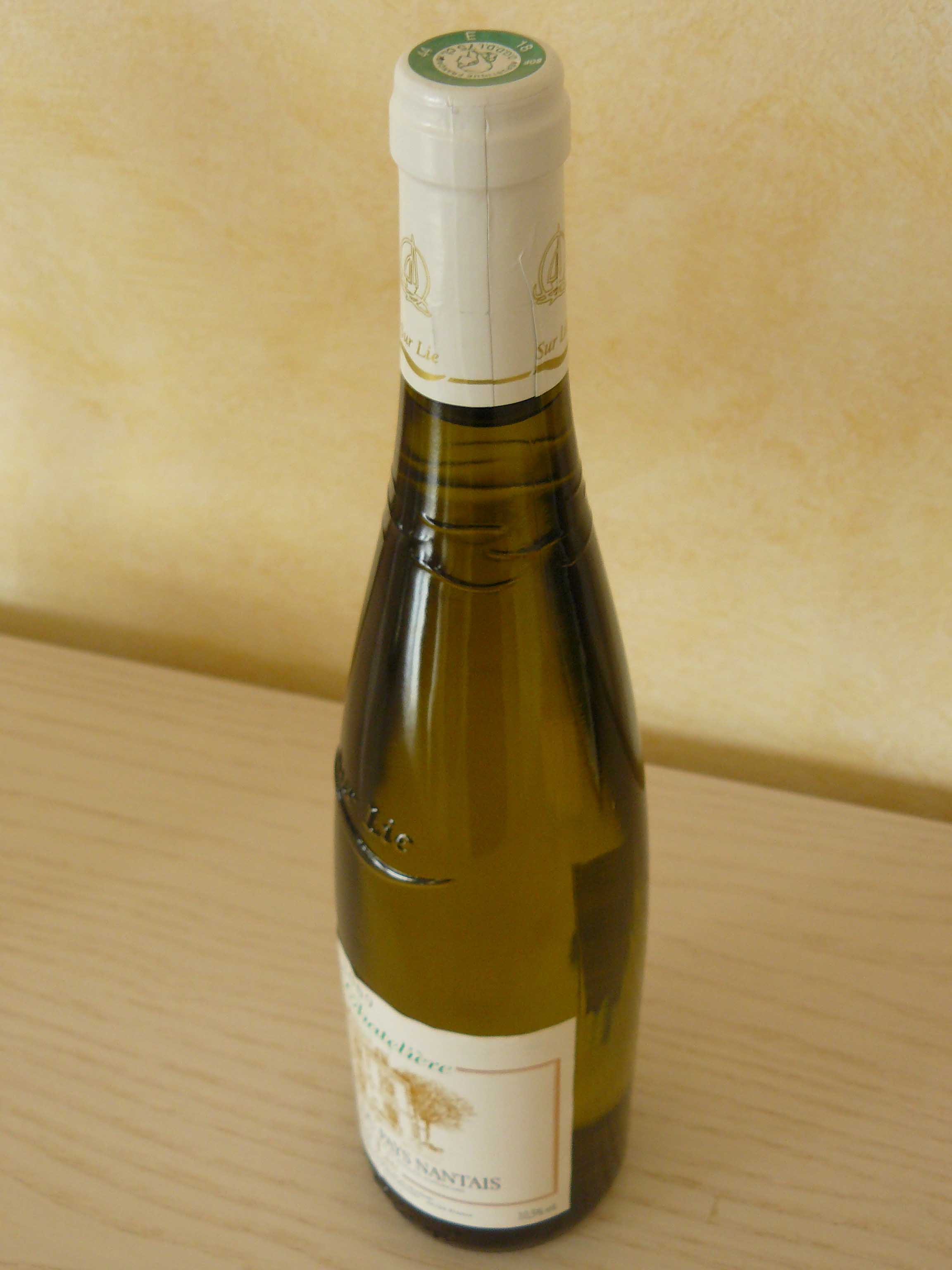
- Bottle of gros-plant-du-pays-nantais.
- Type: dry white
- Year established: 1954
- Country: France
- Sub-regions: Pays nantais
- Location: Loire-Atlantique; Maine-et-Loire; Vendée
- Climate region: Temperate Oceanic
- Soil conditions: Brown metamorphic sand and gravel
- Size of planted vineyards: 1,372 ha en 2008
- Grapes produced: Folle blanche
- Wine produced: 79,380 hl in 2008
- Official designation: Vin délimité de qualité supérieure (VDQS) Appellation d'origine contrôlée (AOC) since 2012

The gros-plant-du-pays-nantais (also known by the simplified name gros-plant) is an appellation d'origine contrôlée (AOC) wine produced mainly in the Pays Nantais (Loire Valley vineyards) in historical Brittany. It is a dry white wine made mainly from the folle-blanche grape variety. In 2008, it covered a surface area of 1,372 hectares in the Pays de la Loire administrative region, mainly south of Nantes, in the Loire-Atlantique département, and extending into the Maine-et-Loire and Vendée départements. In 2010, with 79,380 hectolitres, it was France's leading premium wine by volume.

Having originally had an appellation d'origine vin de qualité supérieure (VDQS), an application to upgrade to an appellation d'origine contrôlée (AOC) was filed in July 2009, and was accepted in February 2011. It has been applicable since March 2012.

Like its neighbor Muscadet, Gros-Plant-du-Pays-Nantais can be aged on lees. Produced for a longer period than the latter, the wine is also drier, with a certain freshness (acidity); it is characterized by a pale color with a green sheen, and gives off predominantly floral aromas (white flowers, hawthorn), citrus (lemon) and even exotic fruit, with occasional mineral notes. It is particularly well known for accompanying seafood.

== History ==
=== Antiquity ===
Grape growing was introduced by the Romans around the 1st century. In 276, a decree issued by the Roman Emperor Probus granted the right to plant vines in the Roman Empire. Soldiers planted the first vines on Roman soil.

=== Middle Ages ===
Later, with the spread of Christianity, the vineyards of Nantes began to develop. Saint Martin of Vertou, founder of the Abbey of Vertou, planted vines throughout the southern Loire region of Nantes.

=== Modern period ===
The vineyard expanded in the 16th century with the introduction of the folle-blanche grape variety. It was quickly given the name "Gros Plant" (Large plant, in English) for its high yields.

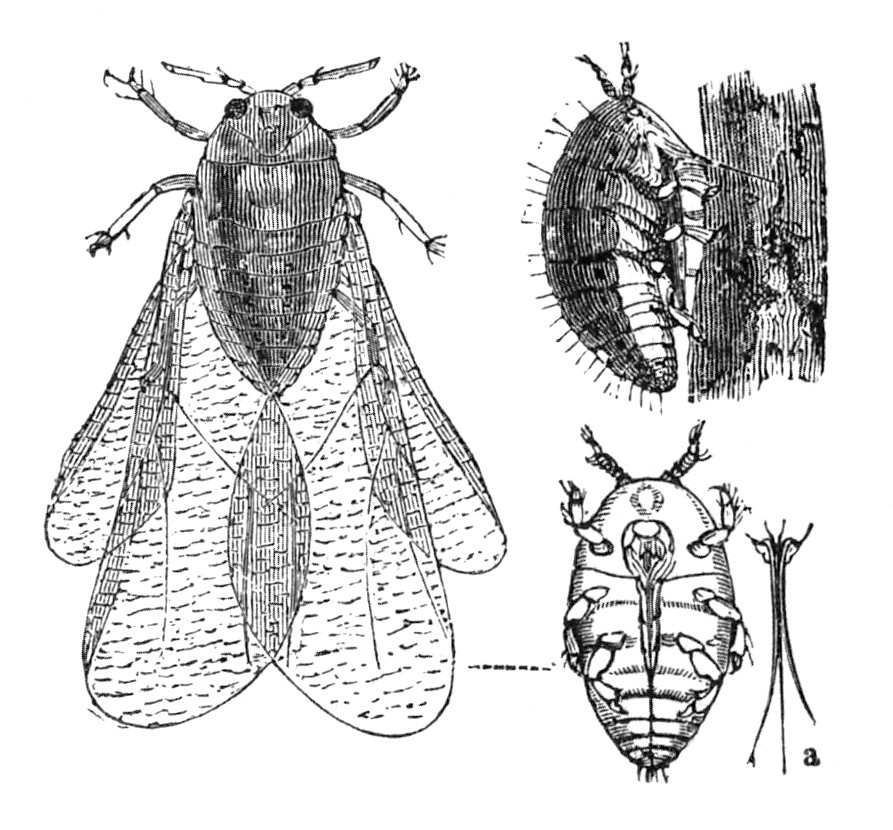
Phylloxera, responsible for the devastation of the vineyards in the 19th century.

Under pressure from Dutch brokers, who sought out these small wines for the alembic, the vineyard enjoyed its heyday until the 17th century. Although Brittany became part of the kingdom of France, it maintained the customs tax at its border, the barrier of Ingrandes. As a result, the wines of the Nantes region, exported from the port of Nantes, were more profitable than their Anjou and Touraine neighbors. The Dutch exported this mass-produced "boiler wine", to the detriment of wine quality.

The 18th century was a very difficult period for the Nantes vineyards. The vineyards suffered devastating frosts during the "Great Winter of 1709", followed by a crisis of overproduction. After this period of turmoil, distillation activity declined in favor of the Cognac region.

=== Contemporary period ===
During the French Revolution, the vineyards were affected by the Vendée wars. During the 19th century, the vineyard reached 50,000 ha, mainly to produce boiler wine for distillation. This area corresponded to the vineyards of the Pays Nantais, planted with folle-blanche B, melon B or red grape varieties. (Note: The international grape variety code indicates the color of the grape: B = white, N = black, Rs = pink, G = gray.) The arrival of phylloxera in 1884 devastated the vineyard, 2/3 of which was then planted with folle-blanche. It was replanted with grafted plants and many direct-producer hybrids.

Replanted in this way, the vineyard reached 5,000 hectares. A quest for quality reduced it to 2,500 hectares in the 1950s. From then on, a policy of reconversion was developed to obtain the appellation d'origine. The Syndicat de Défense was created in 1951. It asserted its commitment to quality and obtained the classification of its wines as VDQS on February 26, 1954, through legal proceedings before the Nantes court.

Today, Gros-plant-du-pays-nantais suffers from the comparison with its neighbor muscadet, which has not experienced the same technical and commercial development. Moreover, the trend is to replace the folle-blanche grape variety with the more profitable melon de Bourgogne. The tendency to limit yields in favor of quality has meant that Gros-plant has lost its strong point. But in 2009, the Union of growers of Gros-plant-du-Pays-nantais presented the Comité national des vins, eaux de vie et autres boissons alcoolisées (National committee for wines, spirits and other alcoholic beverages), of the INAO with a specification initiating a procedure for the recognition of Gros-plant wine as an appellation d'origine contrôlée. This was accepted in February 2011 and became applicable in March 2012.

In January 2018, a public consultation was launched: fourteen communes were to disappear and three new ones were to join the area delimiting the appellation of Gros-plant-du-pays-nantais.

== Etymology ==
While the term "gros plant" (Large plant) has no official origin, several explanations exist. One theory evokes the grape's high yield, while another suggests that its name refers to the size of the vine.

The second part of the appellation, Pays nantais, refers to one of the subdivisions of the former province of Brittany, roughly corresponding to today's Loire-Atlantique department, which produced Gros-plant.

== Geographical location ==
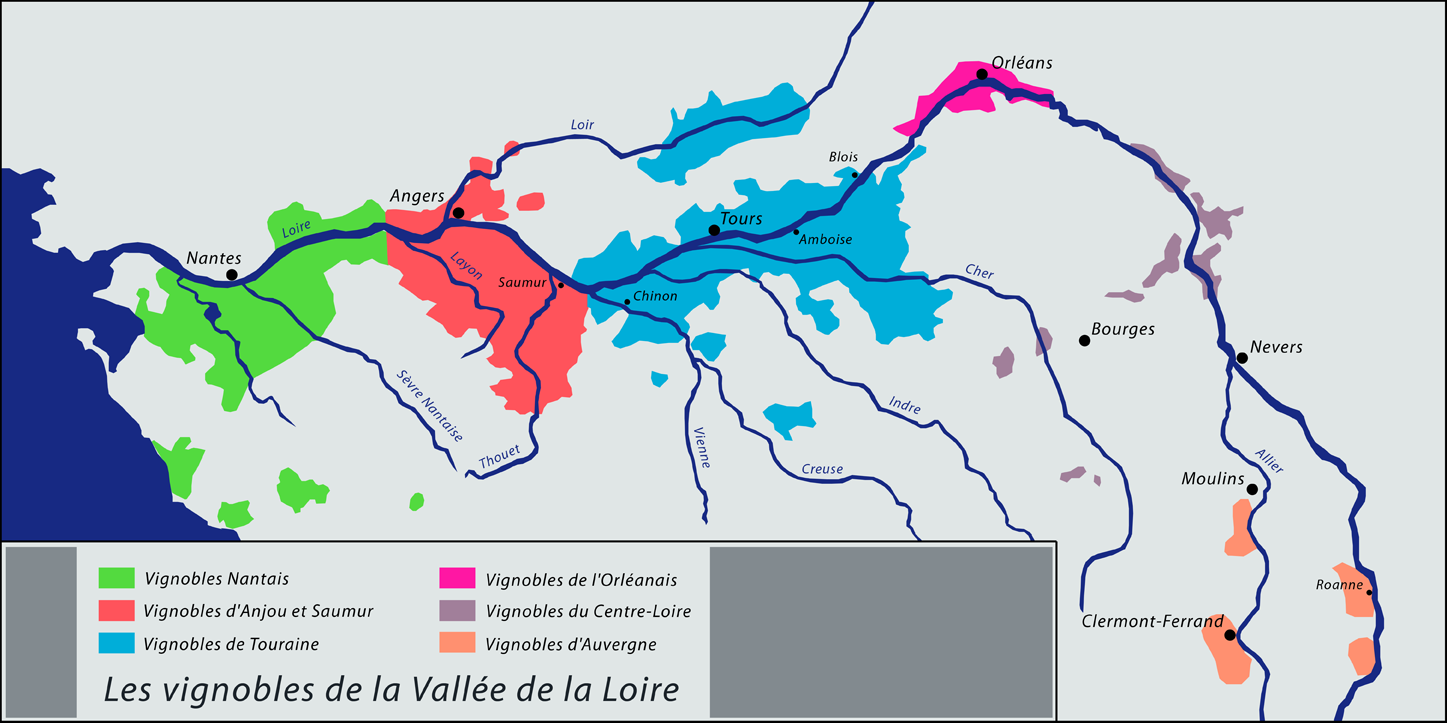
Vineyards of the Loire Valley.

=== Hydrography ===
This wine is produced in the Nantes vineyards along the Loire Valley, in the same area as Muscadet, with the addition of a few communes in the western part of the Pays de Retz near the Atlantic Ocean. But its preferred terroir remains the sandy soils around Lac de Grand-Lieu. Hydrography plays an important role in the development of vines. Indeed, the largest vines are grown near the oceans, lakes and rivers, such as the Sèvre Nantaise, the Maine, the Boulogne and the Acheneau.

=== Orography ===
Vineyards are usually planted on a slope of 3% or more at a relatively low altitude, generally between 5 and 90 meters. The soil must be coarse-textured, healthy, shallow to moderately deep, and developed on a disintegrated or arenized rather than weathered bedrock.

=== Geology ===
Several types of rock make up the geological structure of the vineyard. Precambrian times, which saw the development of the Cadomian and above all Hercynian phases, gave rise to plutonic rocks: greenstone (gabbros, granites) and metamorphic rocks (gneiss, micaschists, amphibolites, eclogites).

Sandy-gravel soils, on locally fossiliferous Pliocene detritus formations, are particularly favorable to Gros-plant. They can be found in the Lac de Grand-lieu (Note: The Holocene mud and peat of the Lac de Grand-lieu contain pollens of Vitis from which selection will give chenin blanc, the most characteristic autochthonous grape variety of the Loire Valley vineyards region, or near the commune of Montbert. Towards Saint-Philbert-de-Bouaine, the gneissic bedrock is covered by isolated lenses of Eocene sand and sandstone, forming mounds as at Montbert, and more extensive veneers of Pliocene sand and plateau silt. On the gravelly, siliceous slopes of the Boulogne valley, Gros-plant is still grown, as in the past. The terroir consists of medium-depth brown soils. The coarse grading of the soil, resulting from the degradation of subsoil rocks, allows good infiltration of rainfall and rapid warming of the soil in spring.)

== Climatology ==
Climate data for Nantes
Month	Jan	Feb	Mar	Apr	May	Jun	Jul	Aug	Sep	Oct	Nov	Dec	Year
Mean daily maximum °F	47.12	49.28	53.96	58.82	64.76	71.42	75.92	75.20	71.24	63.14	53.60	48.20	60.98
Daily mean °F	41.72	43.16	46.58	50.72	56.48	62.42	66.38	65.66	62.24	55.58	47.48	42.80	53.42
Mean daily minimum °F	36.32	37.04	39.2	42.62	48.2	53.42	57.02	56.3	53.24	48.02	41.18	37.4	45.86
Average precipitation inches	3.41	2.76	2.72	1.96	2.52	1.77	1.83	1.76	2.45	3.12	3.42	3.31	31.04
Mean daily maximum °C	8.40	9.60	12.20	14.90	18.20	21.90	24.40	24.00	21.80	17.30	12.00	9.00	16.10
Daily mean °C	5.40	6.20	8.10	10.40	13.60	16.90	19.10	18.70	16.80	13.10	8.60	6.00	11.90
Mean daily minimum °C	2.40	2.80	4.0	5.90	9.0	11.90	13.90	13.5	11.80	8.90	5.10	3.0	7.70
Average precipitation mm	87	70	69	50	64	45	46	45	62	79	87	84	788
Average rainy days	12.8	11	11.1	8.9	11	7.7	6.7	7	8.4	10.4	11.1	11.5	117.6
Average relative humidity (%)	88	84	80	77	78	76	75	76	80	86	88	89	81
Mean monthly sunshine hours	72	99	148	187	211	239	267	239	191	140	91	70	1,956
Source: http://www.infoclimat.fr/climatologie/index.php?s=07222&aff=details Relevés 1961-1990

== Vineyard ==
=== Presentation ===
The appellation area overlaps closely with that of Muscadet. Its terroir extends across the entire Nantes vineyard, from Ancenis to Pornic, with two more important production centers: the eastern Sèvre-et-Maine region (Le Loroux-Bottereau and Vallet) and the Logne, Boulogne and Herbauges regions (Corcoué-sur-Logne and Saint-Philbert-de-Grand-Lieu). The preferred area for Gros-plant is the Pays de Retz. This appellation zone comprises 92 communes, including 69 communes in Loire-Atlantique, 16 communes in Maine-et-Loire and 4 communes in Vendée.

Although Gros-plant is made from a single grape variety, folle-blanche, other grape varieties are grown in the Nantes vineyards within the Gros-plant geographical area, but are not entitled to the Gros-plant-du-pays-nantais appellation. These include Melon de Bourgogne, Cabernet Franc, Gamay, Cabernet Sauvignon, Chenin Blanc and Pinot Gris. However, they can also benefit from other appellations. Among the best known are Muscadet and Coteaux-d'Ancenis.

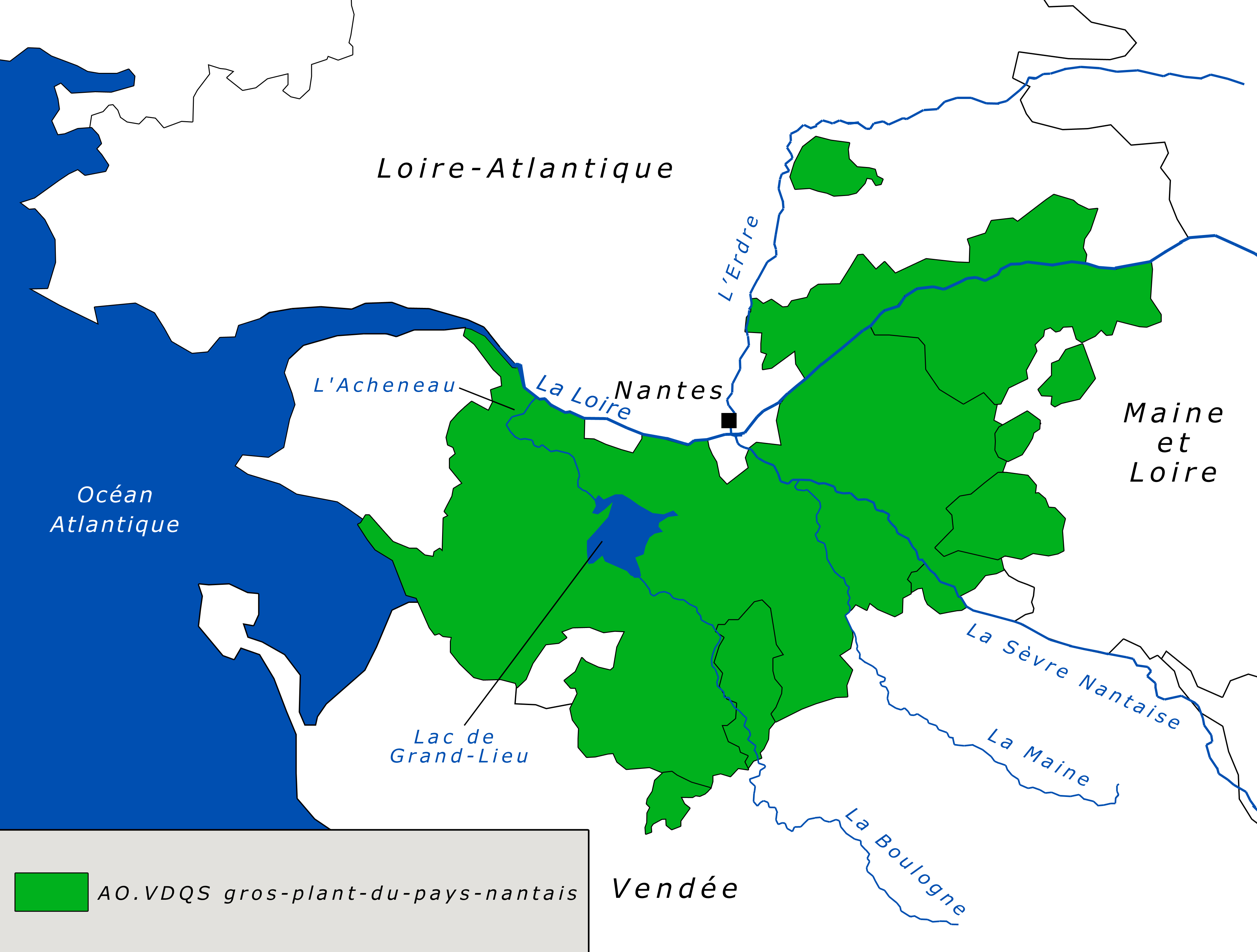
Map of VDQS Gros-plant-du-pays-nantais.

== Grape varieties ==
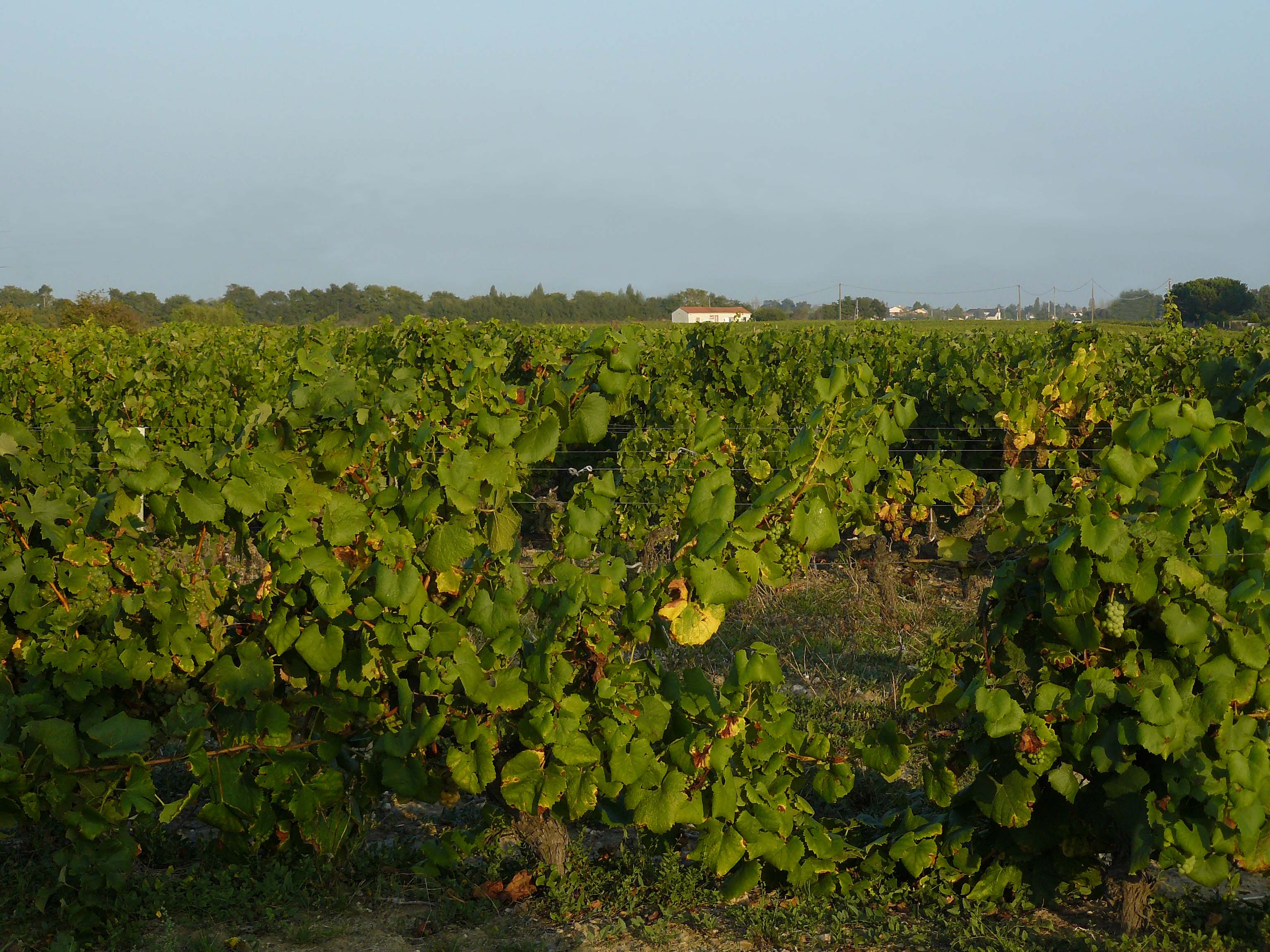
"Coteaux d'Herbauge" Gros-plant vineyard, Pont-Saint-Martin.

Gros-plant is made from the two main grape varieties, folle-blanche B and montils B, and an accessory variety, colombard B.

In the vineyard, only folle-blanche is actually grown. This grape variety, probably of Charentais origin, has long been cultivated in this region when, in the Middle Ages, the English, then the Dutch and Scandinavians, created a craze for planting folle-blanche between Bordeaux and La Rochelle. Small, acidic white wines known as "Rochelle blanc" were produced around the Charente port for export. The white wines of Charente gave rise to cognac when the alembic appeared in the 17th century, particularly after the siege of La Rochelle by Richelieu and the royal troops: unable to export the wines, they were distilled to prevent them from spoiling. From this time onwards, the dry white wines prized by the Dutch were produced further north, around the port of Nantes, in what are now the Muscadet and Gros-Plant-du-Pays-Nantais vineyards.

This variety is naturally susceptible to cryptogamic diseases, notably black rot, gray mold, mildew and wood diseases such as excoriosis. After the phylloxera crisis, grafted folle-blanche became highly susceptible to oidium and mildew; the resulting increase in vigor made it even more susceptible to gray mold, so that it almost disappeared from the Cognac vineyards: wines made from rotten grapes could not be distilled, as the unpleasant odor concentrated in the distillate.

The cool climate of the Nantes region is ideal for growing folle-blanche. In 2002, an experimental plot was planted by SICAREX and ITV (wine research organizations) in Nantes. The aim was to test bi-varietal wines: in particular, to see the benefits of blending at least 80% folle-blanche with 20% montils, colombard or pinot gris. At the end of this experimentation, better quality without compromising the wine's typicality could lead to AOC status.

The well-drained soil evacuates excess water, which favours disease, and the low-fertility terroir helps curb the fertility and vigour of the Gros-plant.

=== Growing methods ===
Planting density is 5,000 vines/ha. The distance between rows may not exceed two meters, and the distance between vines on the row may not be less than one meter.

The vines are pruned using short pruning methods (cordon de Royat, gobelet, fan), single guyot or Guyot Nantais (a combination of single and double guyot, one baguette and two spurs). Vines must be pruned before a green tip appears at the top of the bud, a few days after bud-break, and the number of fertile eyes per vine is limited to fourteen.

Vines are trained vertically. The height of the foliage must be greater than 60% of the distance between rows. Through photosynthesis, the leaves are the organs where the grapes' sugar and aromas are synthesized. Too little foliage is detrimental to the quality of the future wine.

Vines must be managed in such a way as to ensure that the foliage and grapes are in good health, that the soil is well maintained (weeding, grass-cutting or tillage) and that the percentage of dead or missing vines does not exceed 20%; beyond this, the yield is reduced by the percentage of missing vines.

These methods result in an average yield of 70 hl/ha.

=== Harvest ===
At harvest time, the appellation yield is 50 hectoliters per hectare. The minimum potential alcoholic strength of the harvested grapes must exceed 8.5% vol. Below this value, the grapes are not considered ripe enough.

=== Vinification and ageing ===
==== Vinification ====
Sugar content must be less than 127 grams per liter of must. Chaptalization is also used to increase alcoholic strength by volume if necessary. The degree after enrichment must not exceed 11% vol. For their wines to be marketable, appellation producers must comply with the minimum and maximum alcoholic strengths by volume (formerly known as "degré du vin") stipulated in the INAO specifications:

VDQS	White	White
Alcoholic strength by volume	minimum	maximum
Gros-plant-du-pays-nantais	8,5 % vol	11 % vol

Pressing takes place directly after harvesting, to limit oxidation of the must. This is followed by alcoholic fermentation, with temperatures fluctuating between 18 and 20 °C. The wines are then cooled and stabilized. The wines then rest in their vats for the duration of the maturation period.

==== Aging on lees ====
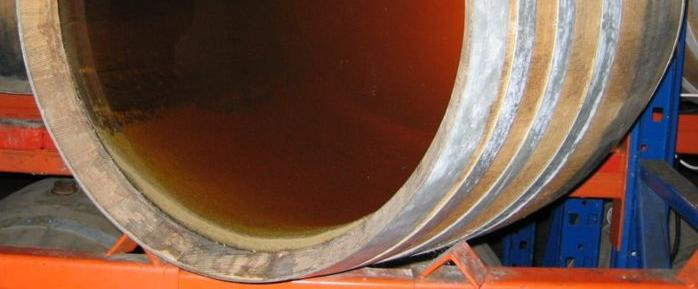
Yeast sediments in a barrel.

Part of the folle-blanche production is aged on lees, as is the case with Muscadet, and remains perlage. In this case, it can bear the "sur lie" label, specific to the Nantes vineyards. For this, the wines must remain on their fine vinification lees from the end of alcoholic fermentation until at least March 1 of the year following the harvest. In addition, the wines must have spent only one winter in vats or barrels, and still be on their lees at the time of bottling. Bottling can only take place between March 1 and November 30 following the harvest. Around 30,000 hl of Gros-plant-du-pays-nantais are produced on lees, representing almost a quarter of total production.

With this technique, the wine comes into contact with a deposit of dead yeast cells (the lees) that has formed at the bottom of the barrel. The discovery of this process was almost accidental at the beginning of the 20th century, as winegrowers in the Nantes region used to keep the best barrel of the harvest to celebrate major family events. Kept without racking, this "wedding barrel" gave the wine a special character, fresher on the palate with a fuller bouquet.

==== Bottling ====
To qualify for the "sur lie" label, wines must remain on fine lees from the end of vinification until bottling. This operation must take place in the winery between March 1 and November 30 following the harvest.

=== Farm structure and main producers ===
In 2005, Gros-plant was produced by 812 operators. Of these, 799 were winegrowers and 700 were winemakers (687 individual wineries, 3 cooperatives and 11 merchants).

According to Michel Mastrojani, all Muscadet and Coteaux d'Ancenis producers market Gros-plant.

=== Commercialization ===
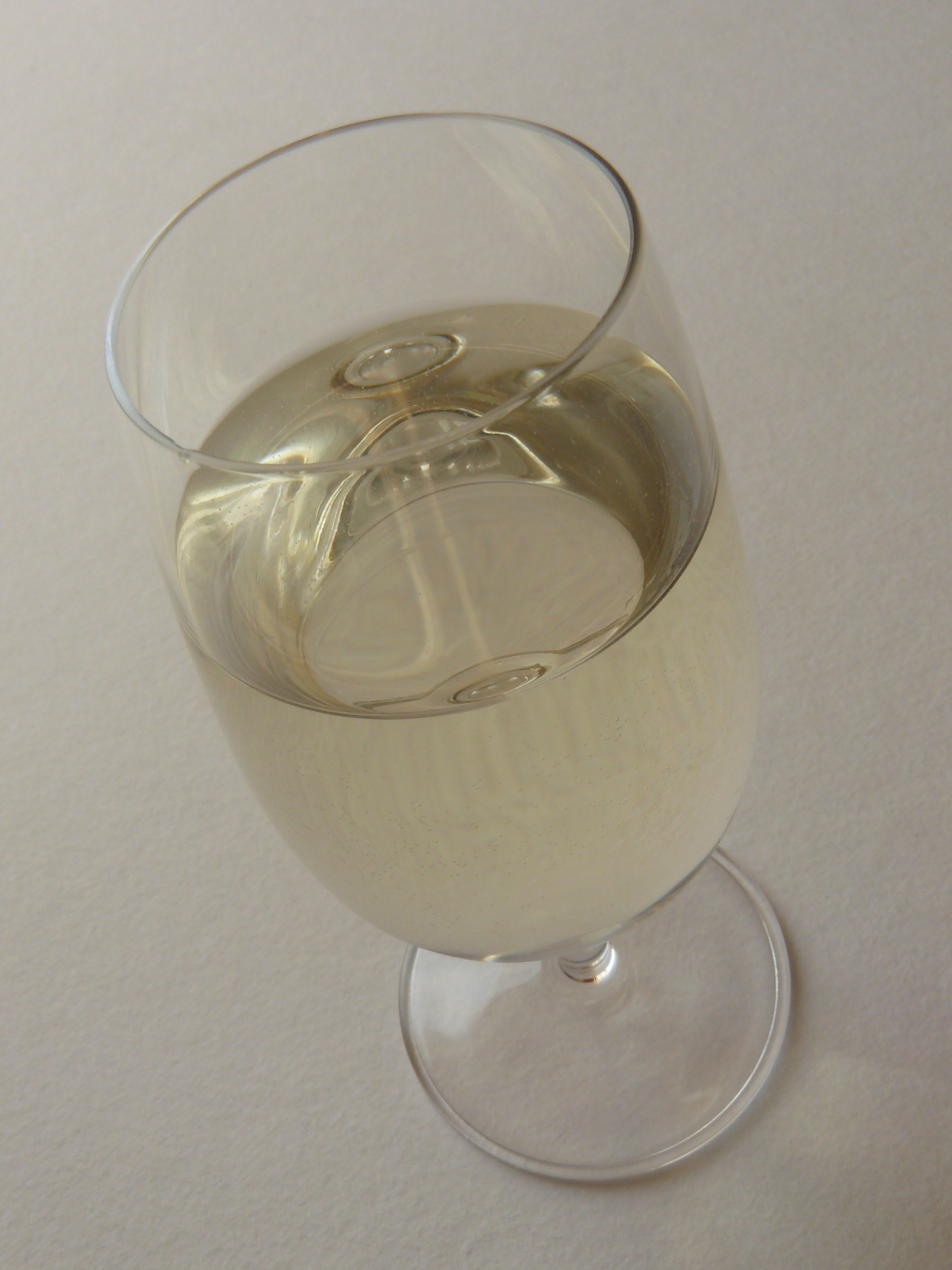
Glass of Gros-plant-du-pays-nantais.

The gros-plant-du-pays-nantais, and more generally the Nantes vineyards, are members of the Interloire interprofessional organization, which brings together a large number of the region's winegrowing professionals. Interloire represents 46 appellations from Nantes to Blois. At wine fairs in France and abroad, Gros Plant is represented alongside wines from Anjou, Saumur and Touraine.

Gros Plant wine enjoys a rather low profile nationally, and virtually non-existent internationally, due to its comparability with Muscadet and other Chardonnays produced in the same Nantes vineyards. Sales are therefore mostly local. Annual production is around 25 million bottles.

In 2008, sales to the gros-plant trade represented 52,000 hectolitres, and direct sales 12,200 hectolitres. Sales of the appellation in 2007 totaled 7.9 million euros.

=== Type of wine and gastronomy ===
Generally speaking, this wine, with its pale green hue, gives off predominantly vegetal and floral aromas, with a few mineral notes and hints of citrus. Its acidity is enhanced by a hint of lemon and iodine. It is also possible to identify two distinct types of gros-plant. The one grown in the Sèvre-et-Maine area is fine and long on the palate. The second, from the Herbauge and Logne-Boulogne regions, is more robust and fruity.

Maturing on lees gives it freshness and lightness. It should be served between 8 and 10 °C. Traditionally, it goes well with fish from the Loire or Lac de Grand-lieu, as well as seafood, especially small oysters, mussels and periwinkles. It remains perfect until its second year in bottle.

== See also ==
- White wine
- Loire Valley (wine)

== Bibliography ==
- Blin, Robert; Prouteau, Christophe; Durivault, Jean-Marie (1991). Pays de la Loire, des côtes du Forez au pays Nantais (in French). Paris: Éditions Solar. ISBN 978-2-263-01747-6.
- Delpal, Jacques-Louis (1998). Accords gourmands: savoir marier mets et vins (in French). Paris: Sélection du Reader's Digest. ISBN 978-2-7098-1001-2..
- Girard, Andrée (1999). Recueil des vins de France (in French). Dijon: Educagri Editions. ISBN 978-2-84444-065-5..
- Johnson, Hugh (1990). Une histoire mondiale du vin de l'Antiquité à nos jours (in French). Paris: Hachette. ISBN 978-2-01-015867-4..
- MacNeil, K. (2001). The Wine Bible. New York: Workman Publishing. ISBN 978-1-56305-434-1..
- Mastrojanni, Michel (1982). Le grand livre des vins de France (in French). Paris: édition Solar. ISBN 978-2-7242-1454-3..
- Stevenson, T. (2005). The Sotheby's Wine Encyclopedia (4 ed.). Londres: Dorling Kindersley. ISBN 978-0-7566-1324-2..
- Robinson, J. (2006). The Oxford Companion to Wine, Third Edition. Oxford University Press. ISBN 0-19-860990-6..
