= Muscadet =

French white wine

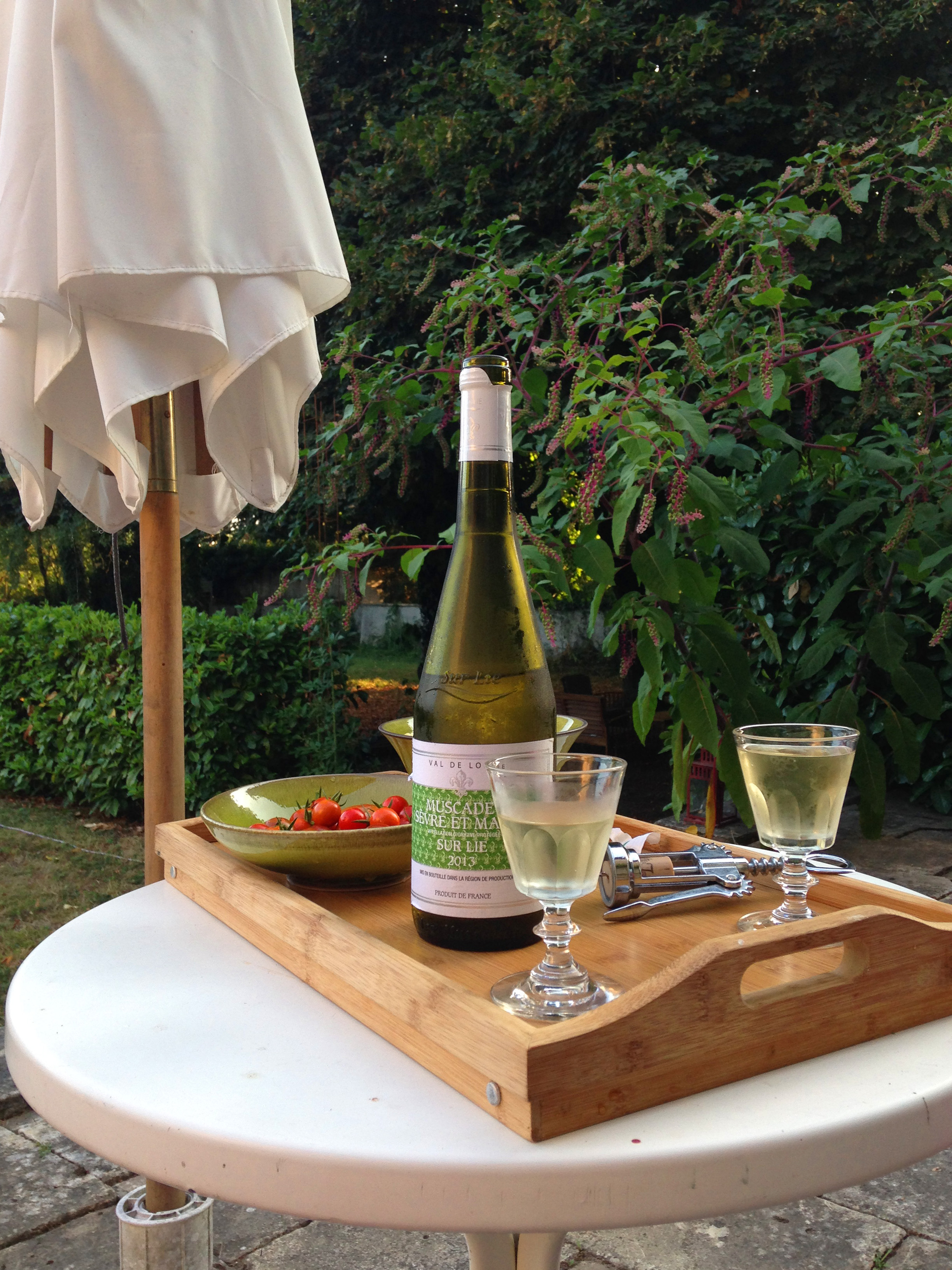
A Muscadet-Sèvre et Maine sur lie wine

Muscadet (UK: /ˈmʌskədeɪ, ˈmʊsk-/ MU(U)SK-ə-day, US: /ˌmʌskəˈdeɪ, ˌmʊsk-/ MU(U)SK-ə-DAY, French: [myskadɛ]) is a French white wine. It's made in the Pays nantais, at the western end of the Loire Valley, in the historical region of Brittany (in the Pays de la Loire administrative region). It is made from the Melon de Bourgogne grape, often referred to simply as melon. While most appellation d'origine contrôlée wines are named after their growing region, or in Alsace after their variety, the name Muscadet refers to an alleged characteristic of the wine produced by the melon grape variety: vin qui a un goût musqué (wine with a musk-like taste). However, according to wine expert Tom Stevenson, Muscadet wines do not have much, if any, muskiness or Muscat-like flavors or aromas.

The sole variety used to produce Muscadet, Melon de Bourgogne, was initially planted in the region sometime in or before the 17th century. It became dominant after a hard freeze in 1709 killed most of the region's vines. Dutch traders, who were major actors in the French wine trade, encouraged the planting of this variety; they distilled much of the wine produced into eau de vie for sale in Northern Europe.

The generic Muscadet appellation, officially established in 1937, contains three regional sub-appellations:

1. Muscadet-Sèvre et Maine, officially established in 1936, covering 20,305 acres (8,217 hectares) with 21 villages in the Loire-Atlantique department and 2 in the Maine-et-Loire department. This appellation produces 80% of all Muscadets.
2. Muscadet-Coteaux de la Loire, officially established in 1936, covering 467 acres (189 hectares) with 24 villages spread across the Loire-Atlantique and Maine-et-Loire departments.
3. Muscadet-Côtes de Grandlieu, officially established in 1994, benefits from the Grandlieu lake's microclimate. This sub appellation covers 717 hectares with 17 villages in the Loire-Atlantique department and 2 villages in the Vendée department.

== History ==
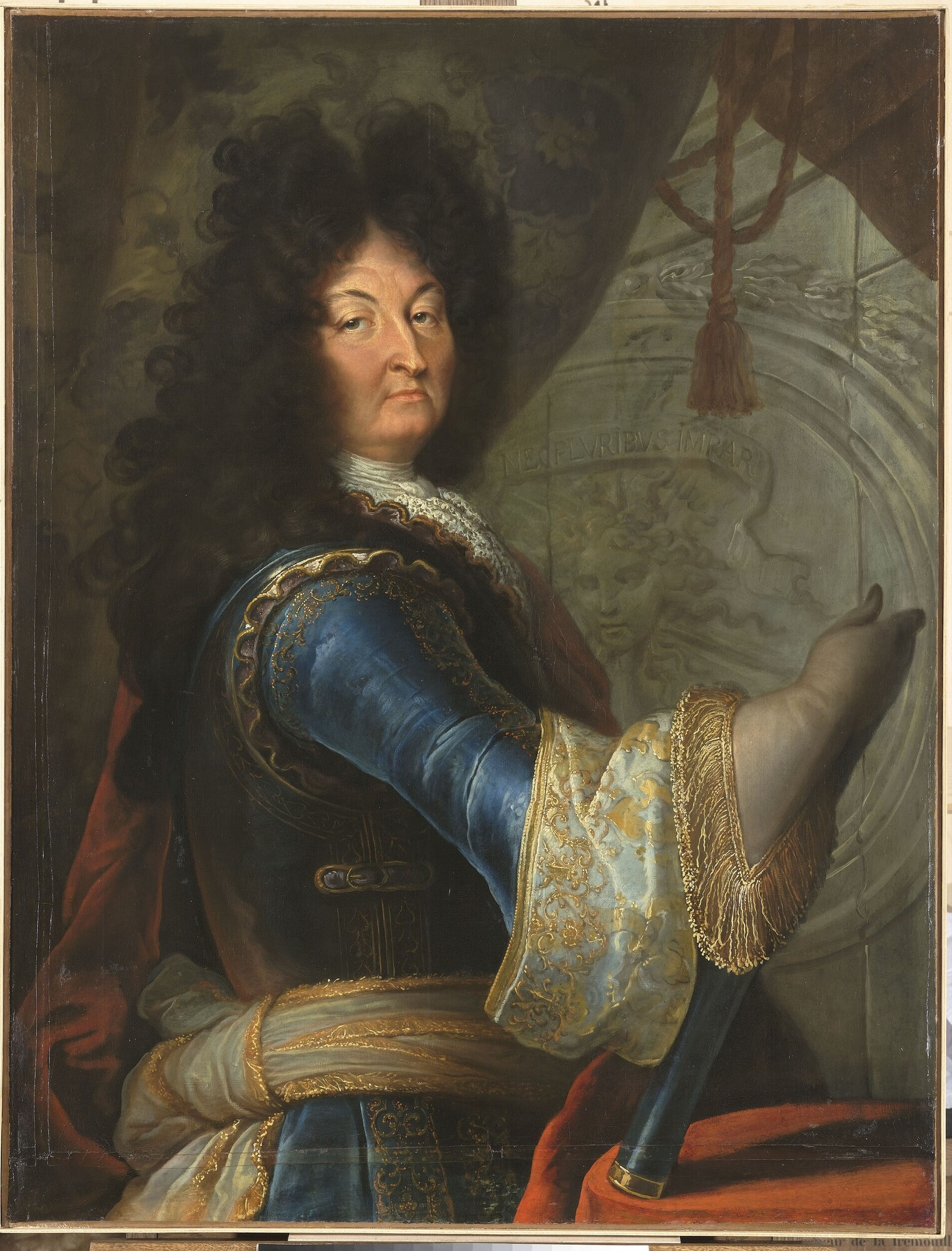
Evidence suggests that Louis XIV ordered the plantings of Melon de Bourgogne in the Muscadet region following the devastating frost of 1709 that wiped out many vineyards.

The wine-growing tradition in the region where Muscadet is produced dates from an edict of the Roman emperor Probus who had the first vineyards planted by soldiers.

The exact origins of Muscadet wine, and its association with the Melon de Bourgogne grape, is not clear. One estate near Nantes, Château de la Cassemichère, claims that the first Melon de Bourgogne vines used to make Muscadet were transported from Burgundy and planted in their vineyards in 1740. However, most ampelographers believe that the Melon de Bourgogne grape was introduced to the Pays Nantais region in the 17th century by Dutch trader looking for a sufficient source of neutral, white wines that could be distilled into brandewijn. Following the deep freeze of 1709, most of the red grape varieties were severely damaged and replaced by the hardier Melon de Bourgogne. The French ampelographer Pierre Galet found evidence that following that deep freeze, King Louis XIV ordered the replanting himself with a grape called Muscadent blanc that was most likely the Melon de Bourgogne.

By the 20th century, Muscadet began to fall out of favor in the global wine market and earned a reputation for being homogenous and simple. The late 20th century saw a revival in the Muscadet region as ambitious wine producers experimented with new winemaking techniques aimed at bringing out more flavor and complexity in the wine. The 1980s saw a rise in use of oak barrel fermentation and lees stirring while the 1990s introduced the widespread use of extended skin-contact (maceration) prior to fermentation. By the 20th century, the use of these techniques created a wide range of styles and quality of Muscadet wine.

== Climate and geography ==
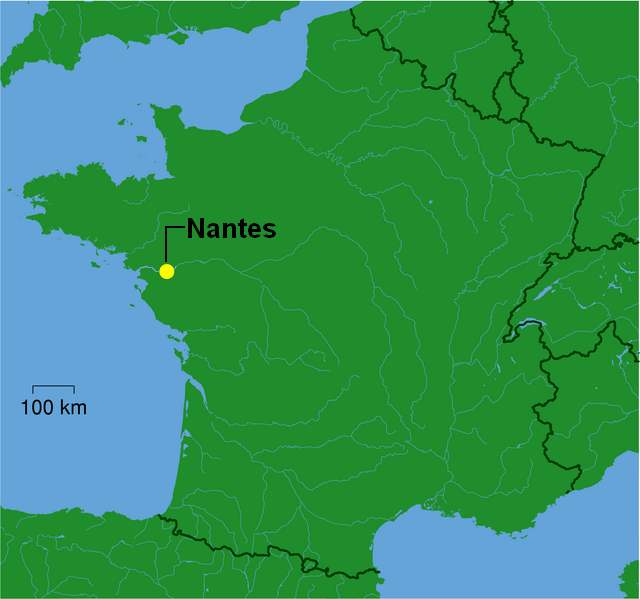
The proximity of Nantes and the Muscadet growing region to the Atlantic coast brings a strong maritime influence to the region

The Muscadet growing region lies at the far western reaches of the Loire Valley and is dominated by maritime influences of the nearby Atlantic Ocean. The ocean's influence makes the climate of the Muscadet region cooler than the rest of the Loire Valley with more precipitation. Wine expert Tom Stevenson notes that the city of Nantes serves as a shield, protecting the region from northwesterly winds. However the closest vineyards to the city in the village of Vertou are located over 9.5 km from the city center and at higher elevation. Winters have the potential to be harsh with deep freezes common and threatening all the way into early spring.

Vineyards in the Muscadet region are scattered across a wide range of terroirs ranging from gentle slopes near the rivers to rolling hills to flat fertile land near the mouth of the Loire river. The most ideally situated vineyards are in the rolling hills Muscadet-Sèvre et Maine sub-appellation located south and east of Nantes. The soil in this area is rich in magnesium and potassium, made up of clay, gravel and sand above subsoils of gneiss, schist, granite and volcanic rock. Throughout the Muscadet region the soils drain well, which is a necessity in a region as damp as the Pays Nantais. In the broader, generic Muscadet AOC (Appellation d'Origine Contrôlée) the soil is predominantly silt and sand while the soils of the Muscadet-Coteaux de la Loire has high concentration of schist and the Muscadet-Côtes de Grandlieu sub-appellation has a mixture of granite and schist based soils.

== Appellations ==
There are four main appellations of the Muscadet region. At the lowest level is the umbrella AOC Muscadet which covers the entire 32,000 acres (13,000 hectares) region. Wine expert Jancis Robinson notes that wines carrying this basic designation are normally the most simple examples of Muscadet. Since the late 1990s, this level has been excluded from using sur lie aging by AOC regulations. Next come the three sub-appellations representing different micro-climates of the region: Muscadet-Sèvre et Maine; Muscadet-Coteaux de la Loire, which includes the northernmost expanse of the area; and Muscadet-Côtes de Grandlieu, which is located in the southwestern area around the eponymous lake. As the most northern sub-appellation, the quality of wines from the Muscadet-Coteaux de la Loire can vary greatly depending on the vintage. In cooler years the grapes struggle to ripen and tend not to have the fruit to balance the acidity. In warmer years, this area tends to produce the most balanced wines. Muscadet-Côtes de Grandlieu is the most recent AOC promotion, gaining its status in 1996. Prior to gaining its own sub-appellation, this region was responsible for nearly three-quarters of the wine labeled as basic Muscadet AOC. Well made examples from Muscadet-Côtes de Grandlieu are characterized by floral bouquet and minerality.

The Muscadet-Sèvre et Maine sub-appellation is the most productive and notable region of Muscadet, producing more than three-quarters of the region's entire production. (In contrast, the Muscadet-Coteaux de la Loire AOC only produces around 20% of the amount of wine of Muscadet-Sèvre et Maine) In fact, more AOC Muscadet-Sèvre et Maine is produced on a yearly basis than in any other single AOC in the entire Loire Valley. The appellation is located east and south around the city of Nantes and is named after the rivers Sèvre and Maine that flow through it. Vineyard soil composition varies throughout the region and can range from the granite and schist hillsides around the village of Saint-Fiacre-sur-Maine to the predominantly clay based soils of Vallet. The most ideally situated vineyards are located around the villages of La Chapelle-Heulin, St-Fiacre, Vallet and Vertou Around 45% of the wine made Muscadet-Sèvre et Maine is aged sur lie. The wines made in this style tend to be slightly fuller body and can have some of the texture and mouthfeel of a white Bourgogne AOC. Well made examples will have a balance of fruit, acidity and texture.

== Viticulture ==
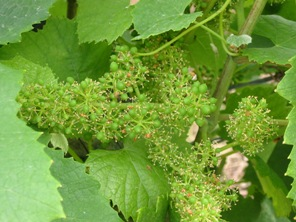
Melon de Bourgogne grapes during flowering.

The most common viticultural hazards in the Muscadet region are seasonal frost and mildew near harvest. The Melon de Bourgogne has adapted well to these condition being very frost resistant and capable of ripening early. Harvest usually takes place in mid to late September but in recent years producers have been experimented with harvesting the grapes several days to a couple weeks later. The traditional method is to harvest early in order to maintain acidity that is a key characteristic of Muscadet wine. The trend to pick later, and risk the threat of rains and mildew rot, is to give the grapes more time to develop sugars and riper phenols that can impart more fruit notes and complexity to the wine. However, these grapes that are picked later will usually experience a dramatic drop in acidity.

== Winemaking ==
The grape variety used to produce Muscadet, Melon de Bourgogne, is a relatively neutral grape. Winemaking techniques have evolved in the region to adapt to the grape's limitation and bring out more flavor and complexity. The most well-known of these techniques is sur lie aging, where the wine stays in contact with the dead yeast cells left over after fermentation (the lees). The technique was discovered, almost accidentally, in the early 20th century. Traditionally Muscadet producers would set aside a barrel of wine for special occasions, such as a family wedding. This "honeymoon barrel", as it became known, would take on more flavor and texture due to its contact with the lees. Through this process, autolysis occurs which contributes to a creamy mouthfeel that may make the wine seem to have a fuller body. The release of enzymes during this process inhibits oxidation which may also improve the aging potential of the wine. During this process, the wine is usually not racked for several months. While in many wines, the lack of racking could have the undesired consequences of developing off flavors or other wine faults. However, the relative neutrality of the Melon de Bourgogne grape works in the favor of the Muscadet wine and poses minimal risk to developing off flavors.

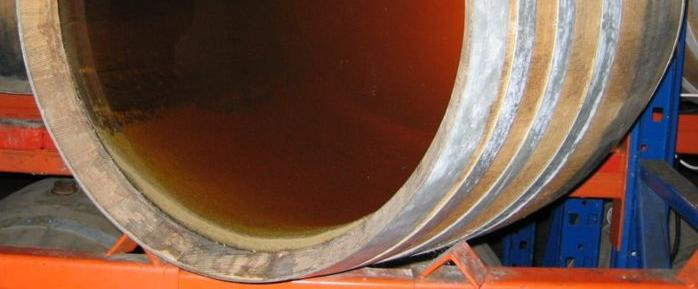
The process of sur lie aging involves the wine staying in constant contact with the dead yeast cells (known as lees) which appear as sediment at the bottom of a wine barrel (example shown).

The late 20th century saw a wave of winemaking innovation and the popularization of several winemaking techniques. The mid-1980s saw increased usage of oak barrels for fermentation over stainless steel fermenting tanks. The process of stirring the lees (bâtonnage) also became more commonplace. By stirring the lees, the dead yeast come into greater contact with the wood-based tannins and pigments that are usually extracted into the wine. The lees act as a sort of buffer between the wines and the oak elements, allowing the wine to maintain its color and not become too harsh and tannic. In the late 1990s, more Muscadet producers started extending the amount of time that the must spends in contact with the grape skins prior to fermentation. This extended maceration allowed the wine to leach more phenolic compounds from the skin which can add complexity to the wine.

Muscadet wines are usually bottled in the spring or autumn following the vintage though they can be made in the vins de primeur style (like a Beaujolais nouveau) and be released as early as the third Thursday of November. At time of bottling some carbon dioxide may still be present in the wine, giving it a slight effervescence that can come across as a "prickly" sensation to the tongue. This effervescence is rarely seen to the degree of a semi-sparkling wine such as Lambrusco. Under French AOC regulations, the maximum alcohol content of a Muscadet must be no more than 12% (after chaptalization)-making it the only unfortified French wine to have a maximum alcohol content stipulation.

=== Sur lie on the wine label ===
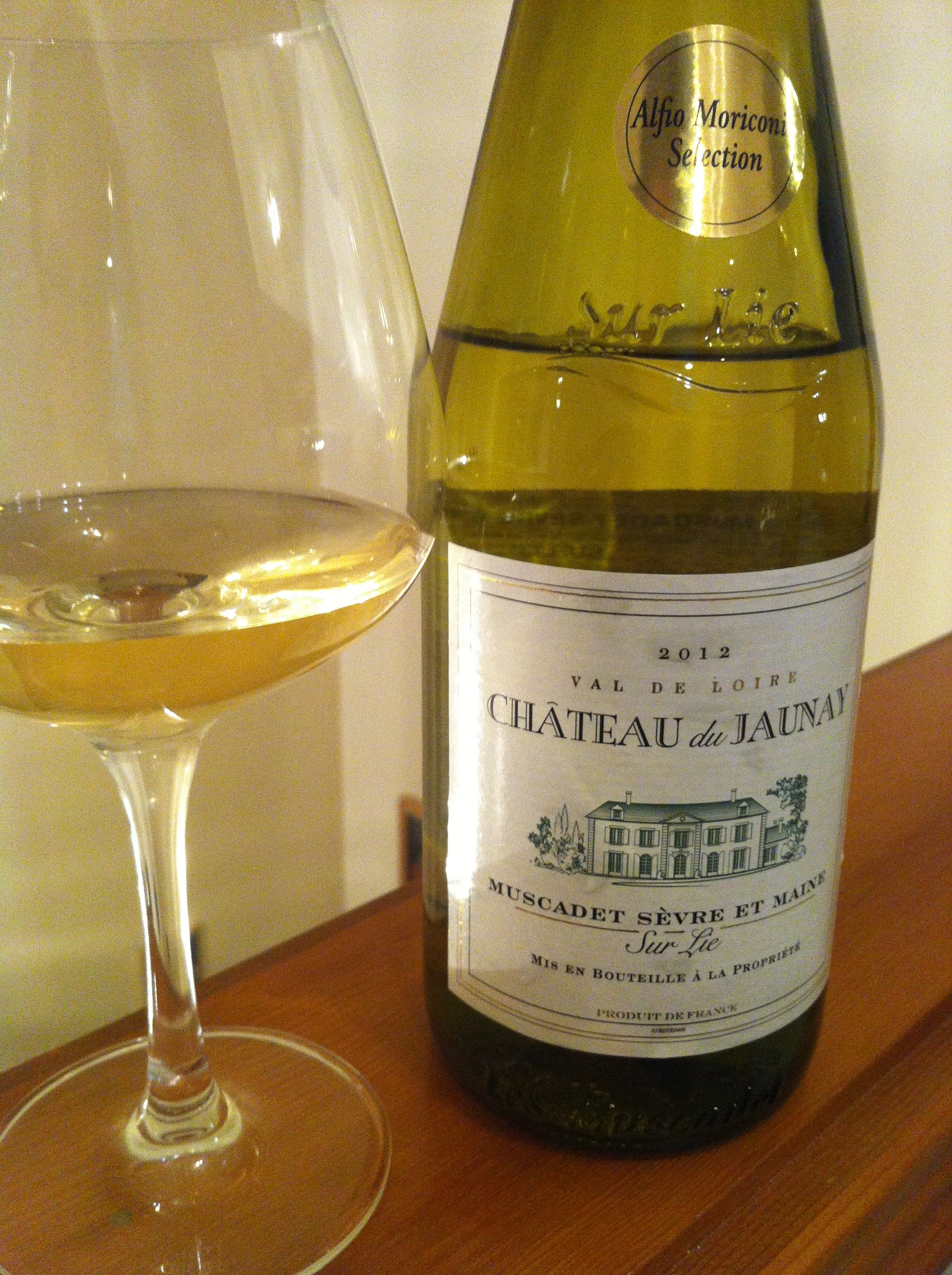
Wine bottle with the words sur lie printed on both the label as well as embossed on the wine bottle itself.

Prior to the early 1990s, any producer of Muscadet wine could use the phrase sur lie on their wine labels regardless of the length of time and manner that it actually spent in contact with the lees. In 1994, French authorities designed regulations that limit the use of sur lie to only wines that comply with a set guideline. First, while the sub-appellations of Muscadet-Sèvre et Maine, Muscadet-Coteaux de la Loire and Muscadet-Côtes de Grandlieu are permitted to use the term, any wine labeled with just the generic AOC Muscadet cannot. Second, the wine must spend at least a full winter in contact with the lees and not be bottled until after the third week of March following the harvest. Some wines are kept in contact longer, in order to produce a more full-bodied style, and not bottled till between mid-October to mid-November. Finally the wine must be bottled directly off its lees and not go through any racking or filtration process. Currently there is no regulation on the size or type of vessel that the wine should be kept in sur lie with. There is a movement among some Muscadet producers to limit the practice to just that done in standard-sized oak barrels, but currently any size barrel or even stainless steel fermentation tanks are allowed to age a wine sur lie and label it accordingly.

== Wine industry ==
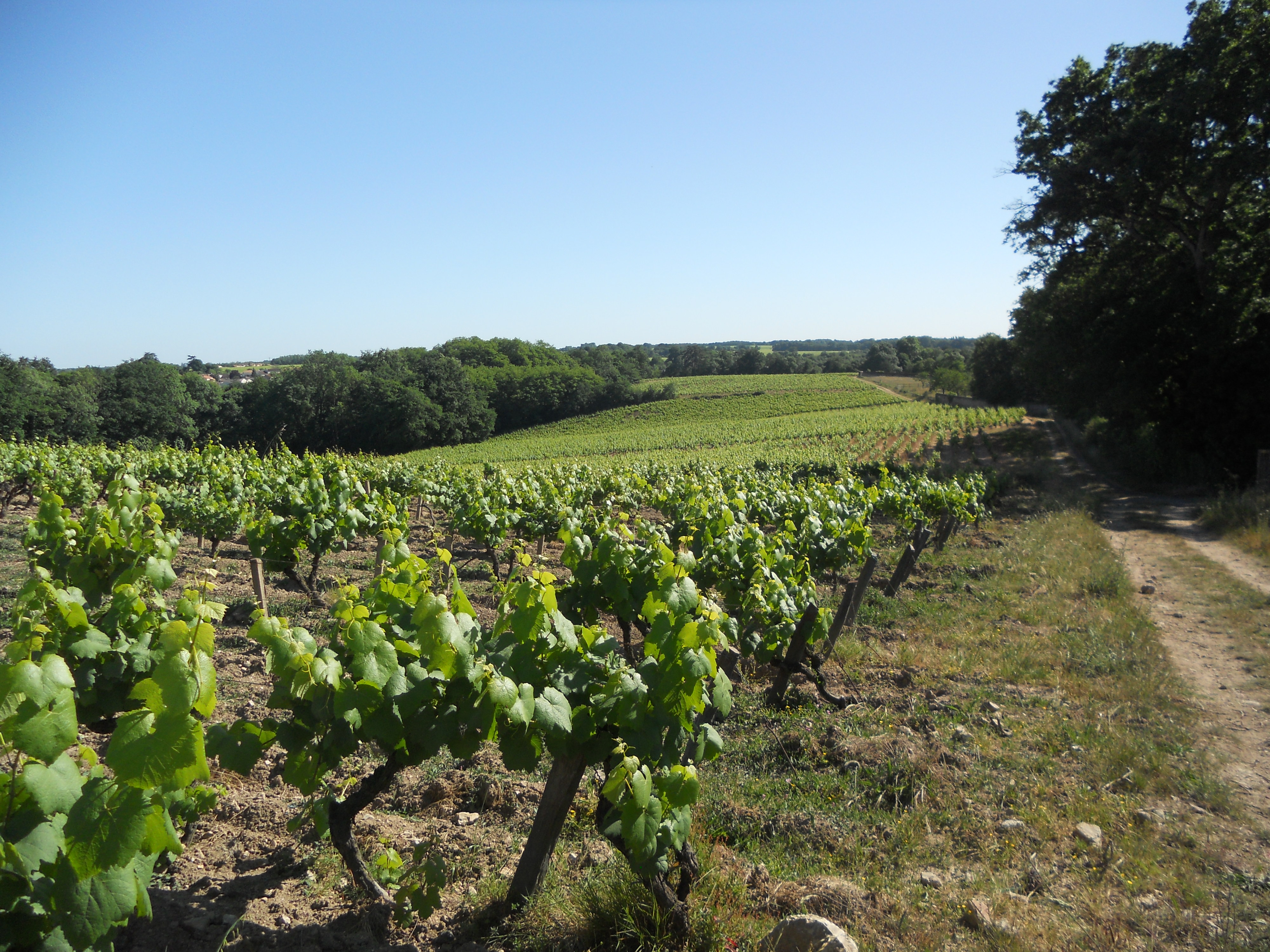
Vineyard of Melon de Bourgogne in the Muscadet region.

At the turn of the 21st century there were over 2,500 vineyards in the Muscadet region tended mostly as small lots by individual farmers who either commercialize their own wine or sell their grapes to one of the forty plus négociants in the region. These négociants would blend and bottle the wine under their own label.

== Grapes ==
Historically, the only grape variety permitted in any of the AOC Muscadet was Melon de Bourgogne. The grape was once prevalent in the Burgundy wine region but was eventually prohibited in the region by French authorities. Introduced by Dutch wine traders in the 17th century, the grape came to thrive in the cool, mild climate of the Pays Nantais. Since 2018, the INAO now allows up to 10% Chardonnay to be used in Muscadet AOC (but not in regionally or village labeled Muscadets (e.g. Sevre et Maine).

Other varieties are grown in the region-such as Folle blanche, Cabernet franc, Gamay, Cabernet Sauvignon, Pinot noir and Chenin blanc, Pinot gris, Groslot, and Négrette-but must be used under different designations such as the Vin Délimité de Qualité Supérieure (VDQS) wines of Coteaux d'Ancenis, Fiefs Vendéens or Gros Plant du Pays Nantais.

== Wines ==
Muscadet wines are often light bodied and almost always dry with very little, if any residual sugar. The AOP (Appellation d'Origine Protégée) states that the wine may not have residual sugar above 5 grams per liter for Blanc and above 3 grams of sugar per liter for Blanc "Sur Lie." Left over carbon dioxide from the bottling process can leave the wines with a slight "prickly" sensation. Master of Wine Mary Ewing-Mulligan describes Muscadets as fresh and crisp, at their peak drinking ability from release up to three years of age. Muscadet that have been aged sur lie can have very subtle "yeasty" aromas. The acidity keeps the wines light and refreshing. Some examples can have a slight "saltiness" about them.

=== Food pairing ===
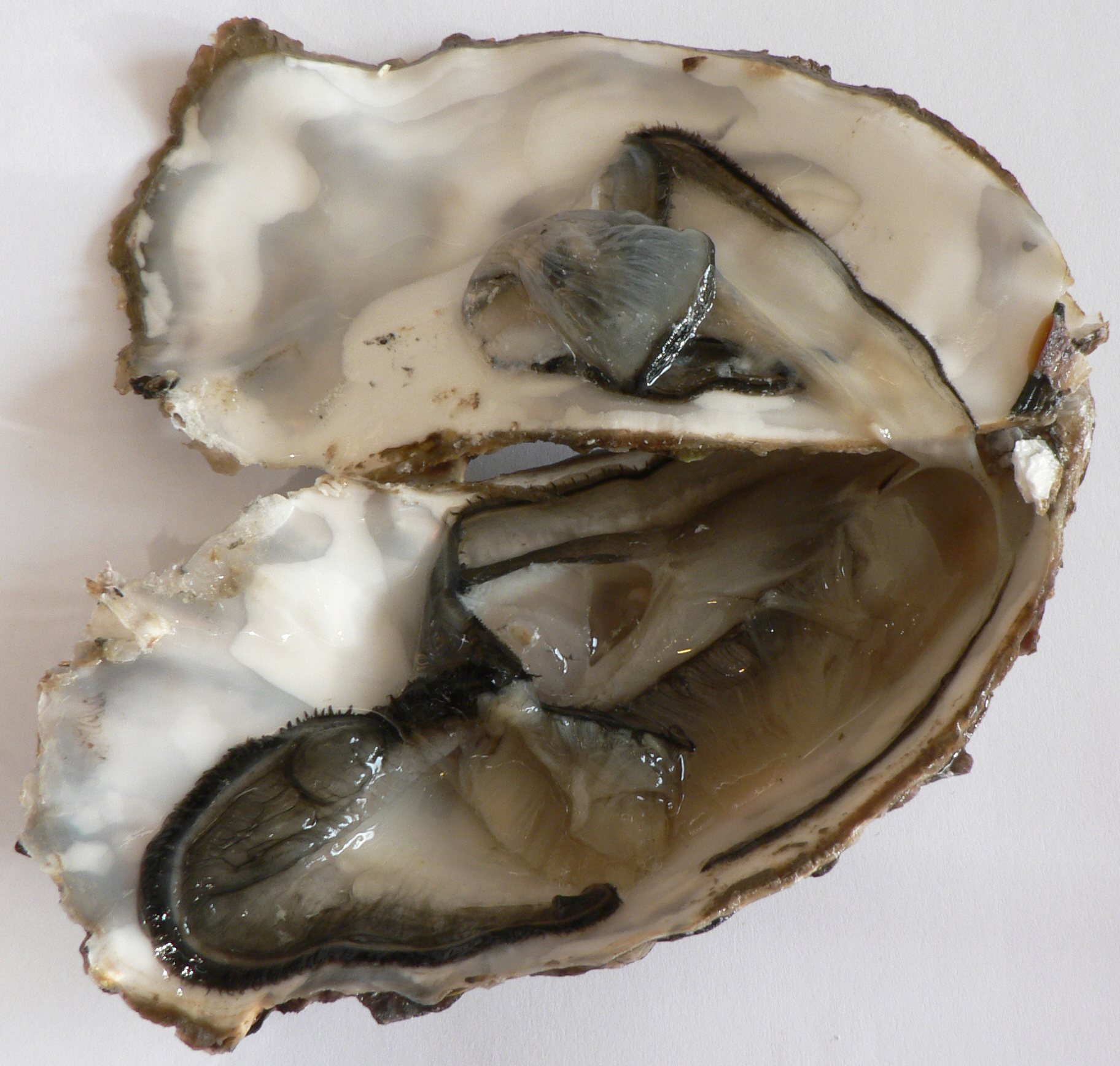
Muscadet has been described by Jon Bonné as the "perfect oyster wine"

The classic food and wine pairings in the Pays Nantais region is of Muscadet with the local seafood, particularly oysters. Other seafood dishes with which Muscadet pairs well include lobster, shrimp and mullet. San Francisco Chronicle wine editor Jon Bonné called Muscadet "the perfect oyster wine". The moderate alcohol level of Muscadet allows it to complement many types of dishes without overwhelming them. The light, crisp acidity can "cut through" (meaning it stands out against) rich, creamy dishes which can be a refreshing change of pace for the palate.

=== Cellaring and service ===
Most Muscadets should be drunk within three years of production. There are, however, some exceptions to this rule. Depending upon the soils upon which they are produced and vinification, some Muscadets can have an aging potential of up to and exceeding ten years. The organisation responsible in France for promoting Loire Valley wines suggests that Muscadet should be served at between 9 and 11 °C (48 and 52 °F).

== See also ==
- List of Vins de Primeur
