= Boulogne (river) =

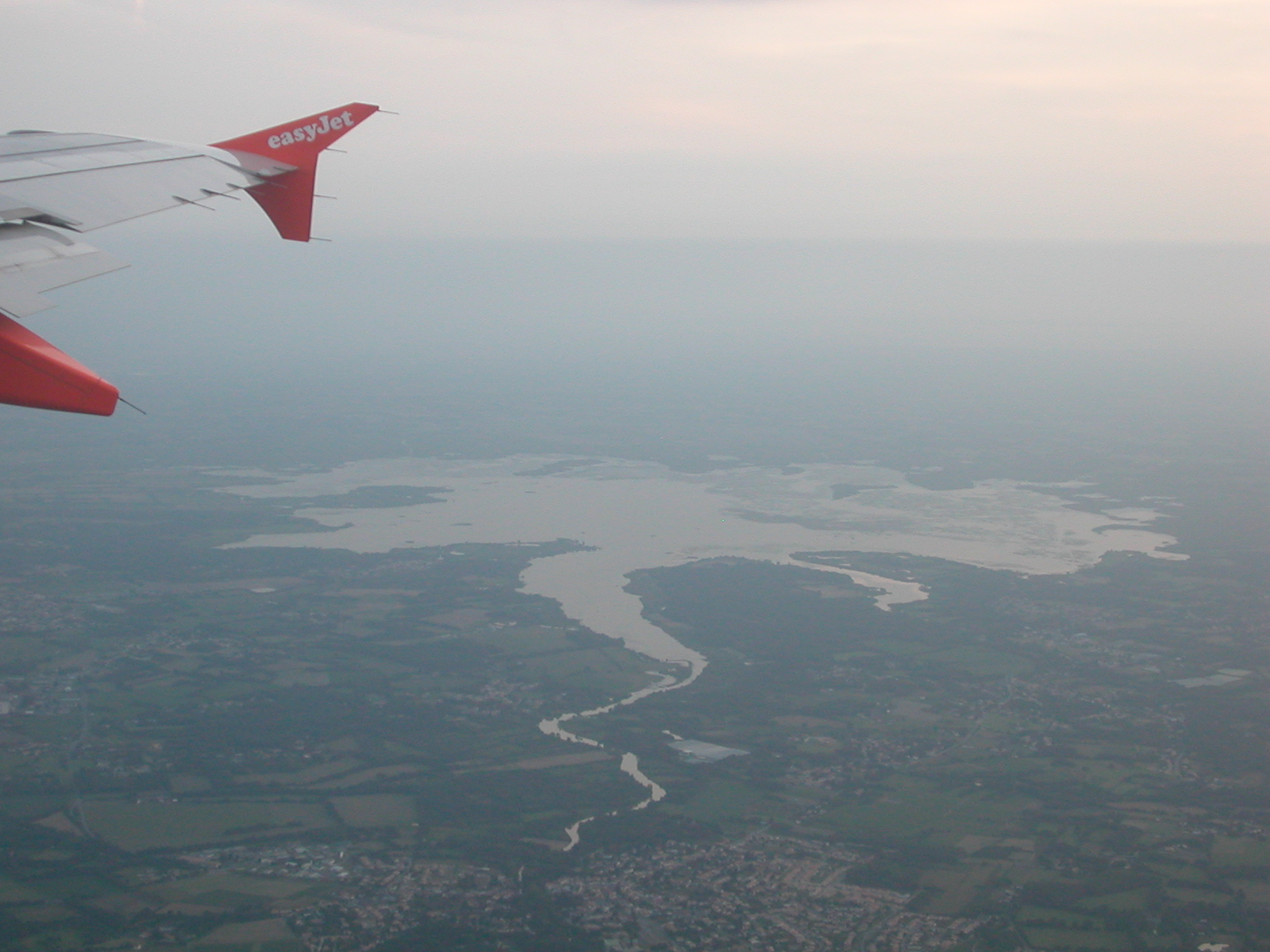

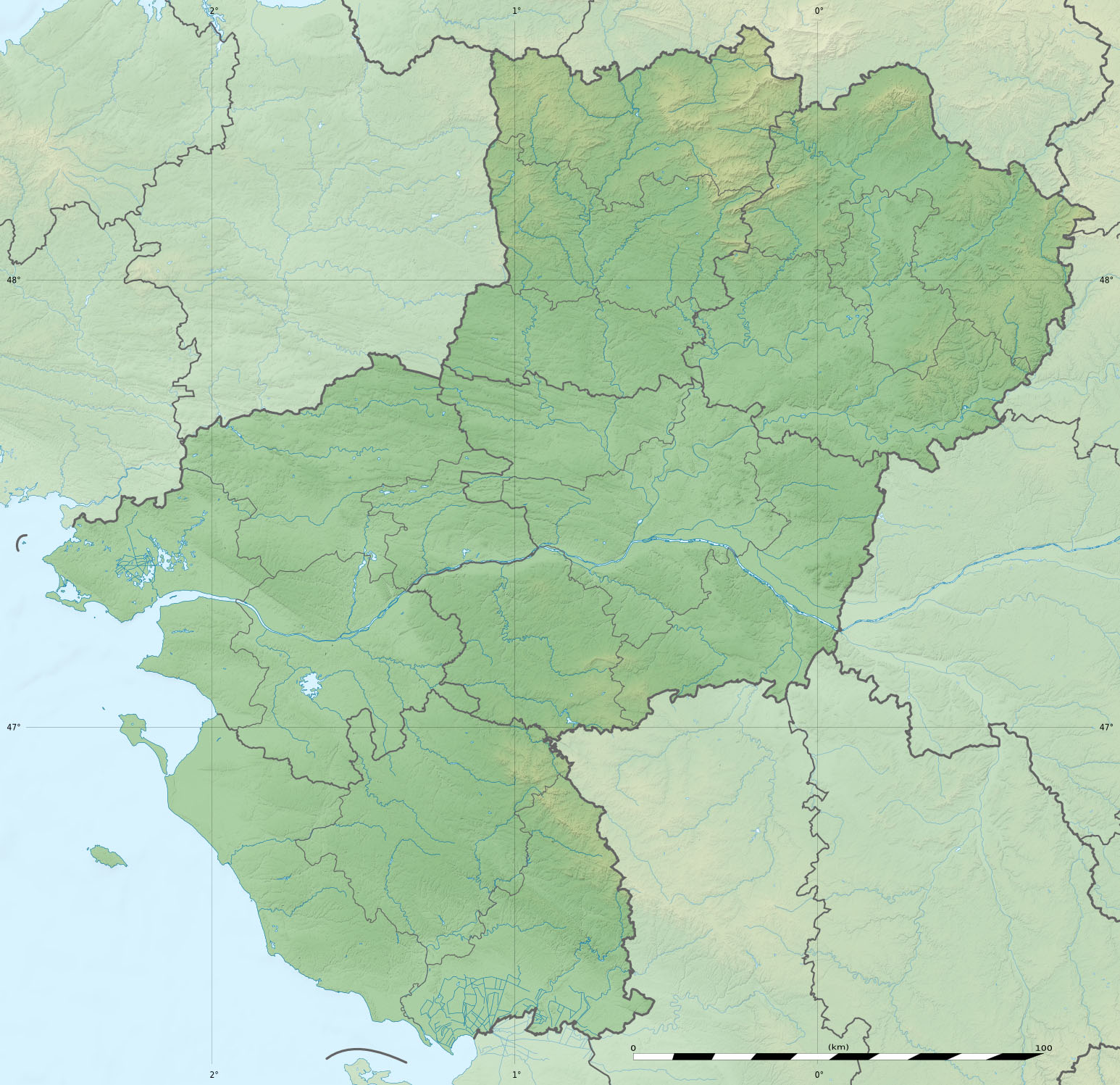
- Location within France Location within Pays de la Loire

Location
- Country: France

Physical characteristics
- Mouth: Lac de Grand-Lieu
  - coordinates: 47.077°N 1.675°W

Basin features
- Progression: Lac de Grand-Lieu→ Acheneau→ Loire→ Atlantic Ocean

The river Boulogne (French: [bulɔɲ]; Breton: Boulogn) is located in western France in the départements Loire-Atlantique and Vendée.

It is 86.5 km (53.7 mi) in length and flows north from the source near Saint-Martin-des-Noyers, through Les Essarts and La Merlatière, then through Boulogne, Vendée and Les Lucs-sur-Boulogne into the Lac de Grand-Lieu. This lake is drained by the river Acheneau towards the Loire.
