= Blanche (Loire-Atlantique) =

Small river in the Loire-Atlantique department of France

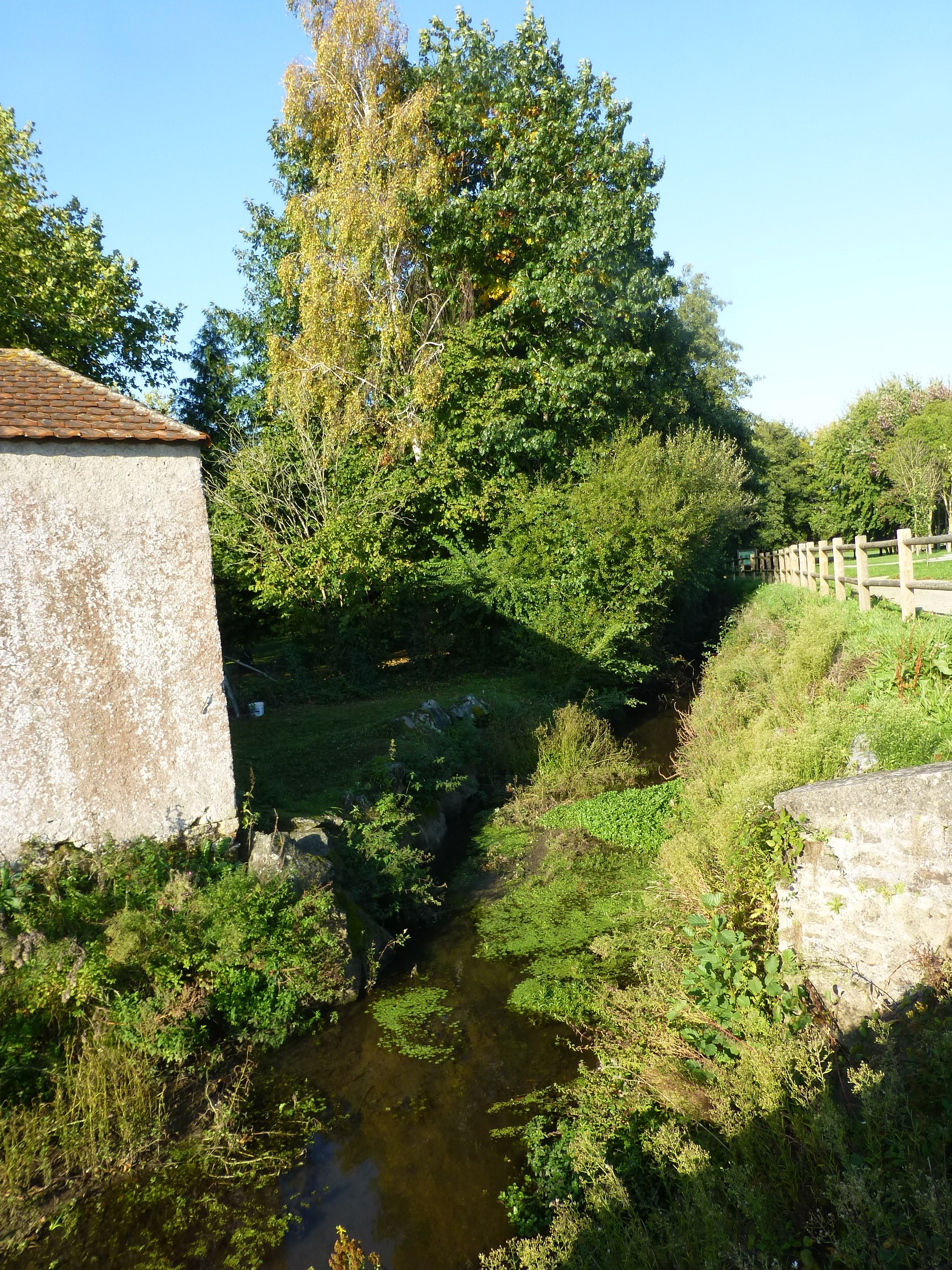
- La Blanche river at the end of summer in Chéméré.

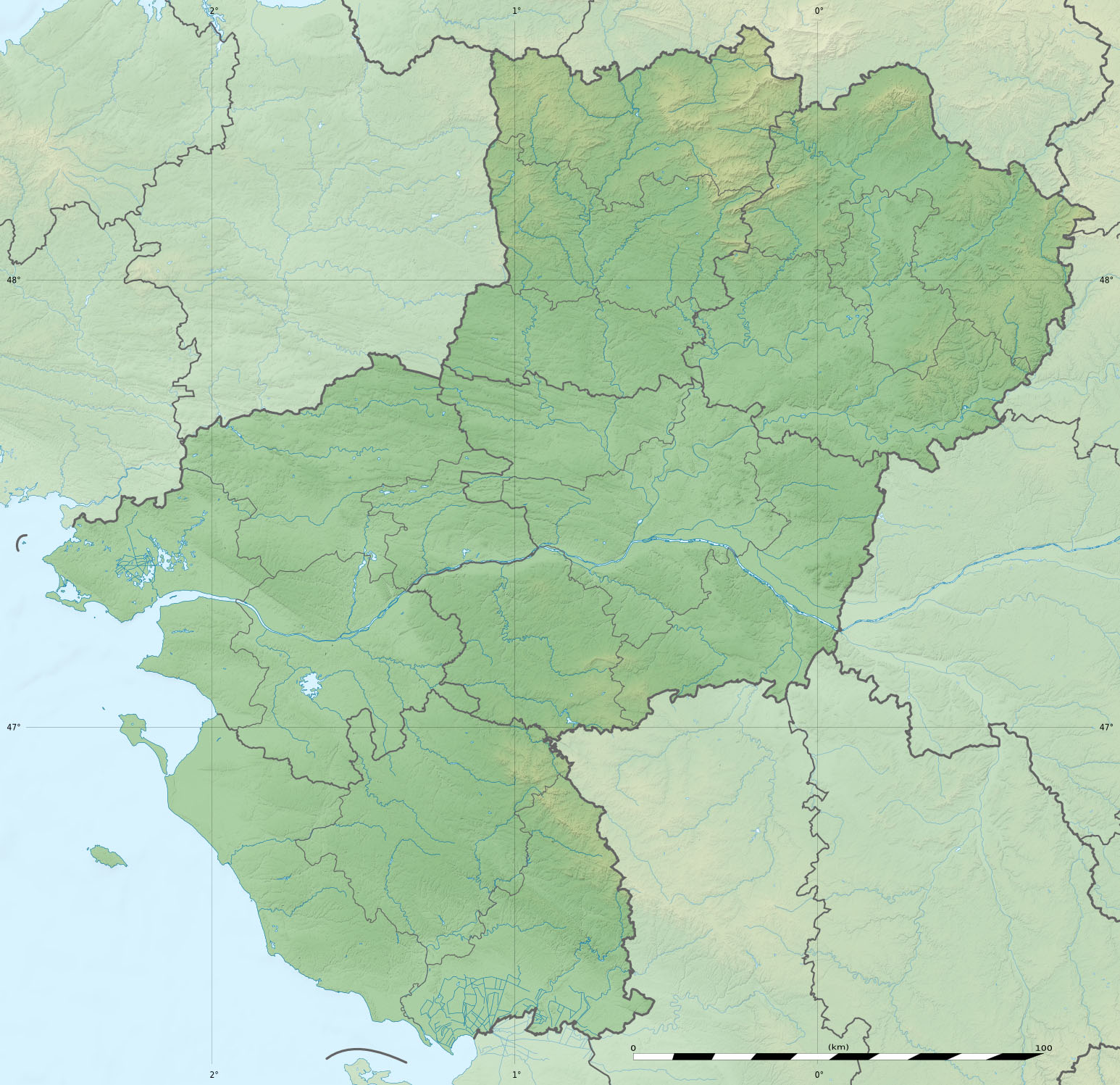
- Location within France Location within Pays de la Loire
- Native name: La Blanche (French)

Location
- Country: France
- Department: Loire-Atlantique
- Arrondissement: Nantes

Physical characteristics
- Source
  - location: Chaumes-en-Retz
  - coordinates: 47.1179°N 1.9297°W
  - elevation: 11,36
- Mouth: Acheneau
  - location: Cheix-en-Retz
  - coordinates: 47.1791°N 1.8301°W
  - elevation: 0m
- Length: 16.7 km (10.4 mi)

Basin features
- Progression: Acheneau→ Loire→ Atlantic Ocean
- Tributaries
  - right: Ruisseau du Bois Beaulieu

The Blanche (French pronunciation: [blɑ̃ʃ]; Breton: Gwenn) is a tributary of the left bank of the Acheneau and thus a sub-tributary of the Loire.

== Etymology ==
The name, Blanche, meaning white in French, is thought to derive from the presence of white chalk in the water from the lime kilns around Arthon-en-Retz. Another hypothesis is that the name derives from the white mist over its related marshland.

== Geography ==
La Blanche is located entirely in the Pays de Retz, south of the Loire in the department of Loire-Atlantique. It covers the municipalities of Chaumes-en-Retz ( Arthon-en-Retz and Chéméré), Saint-Hilaire-de-Chaléons, Cheix-en-Retz and Rouans.

== Hydrography ==
The Blanche basin is bordered by the Acheneau basins to the north, the Tenu to the east, the Falleron to the south and the Canal de Haute Perche to the west. It has its source in the east of Chaumes-en-Retz and it flows eastward, fed from the north by streams from the Forêt de Princé and from the south from around Saint-Hilaire-de-Chaléons. After about 7 km the river veers north and continues for 9 km, fed by several streams from the west and east including the Ruisseau du Bois de Beaulieu at Pont Beranger. Its confluence with the Acheneau is in the marshes of the Marais de Cheix south of Cheix-en-Retz where it divides into two, the Vielle Blanche joining the Acheneau to Buzon while the Blanche continues to the west more channelled in a network of canals, joining the Acheneau further south-west of the town in the Marais d'Acheneau.

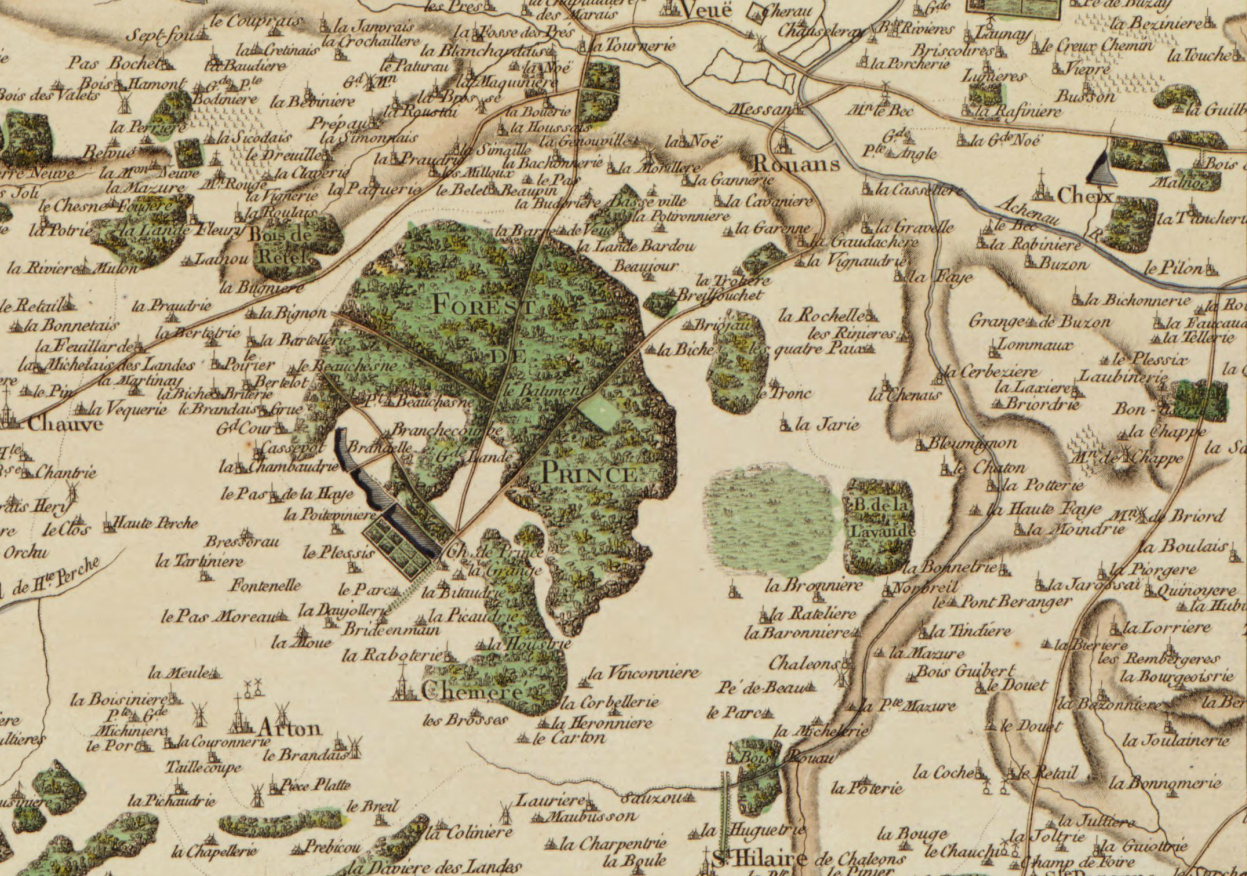
La Blanche to the south and east of the Forest of Princé on the Cassini Map (17th century)
