= Port-Saint-Père =

- Commune
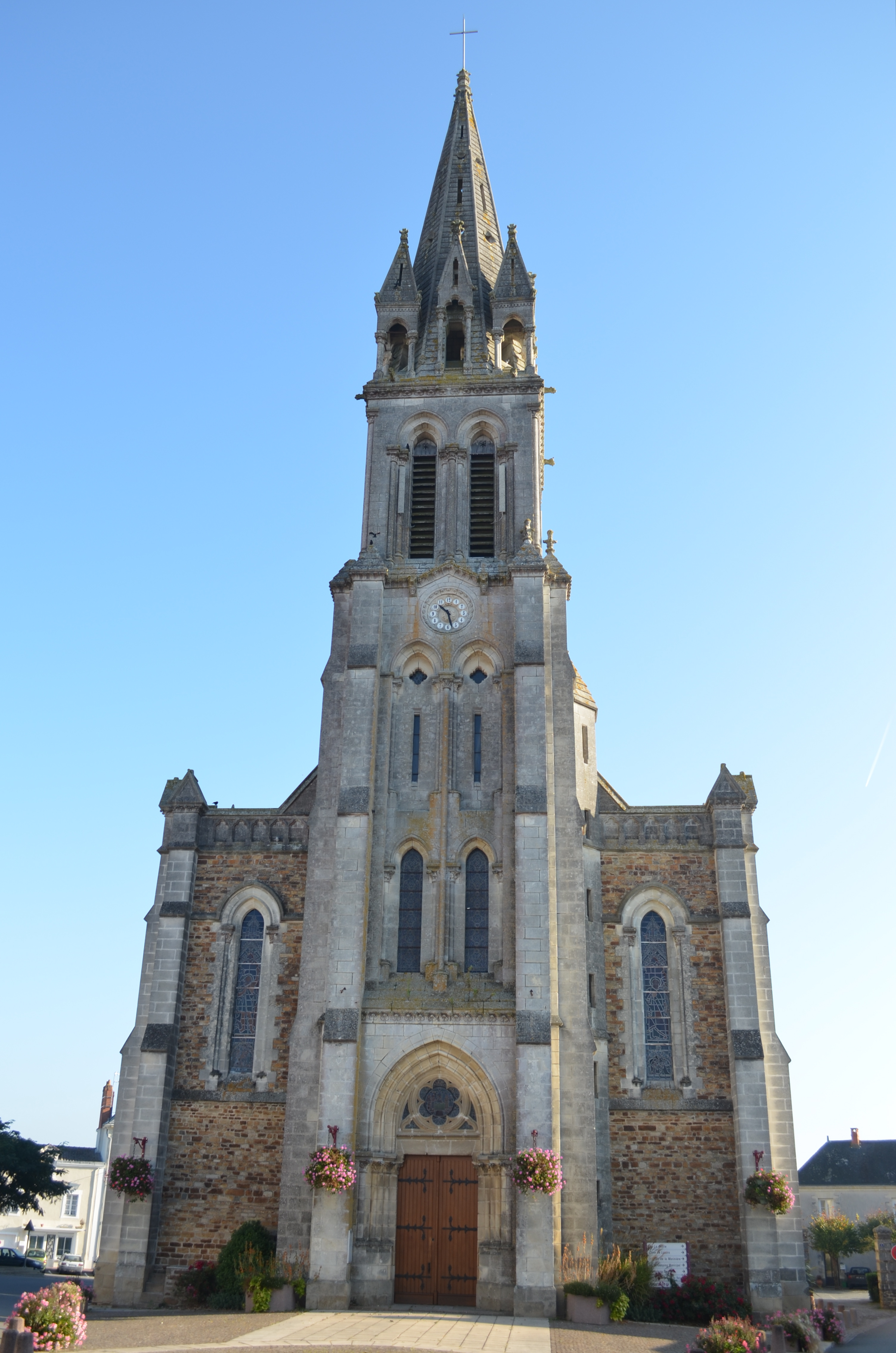

- Coat of arms
- Location of Port-Saint-Père
- Location within France Location within Pays de la Loire
- Coordinates: 47°08′00″N 1°45′00″W
- Country: France
- Region: Pays de la Loire
- Department: Loire-Atlantique
- Arrondissement: Nantes
- Canton: Machecoul-Saint-Même
- Intercommunality: CA Pornic Agglo Pays de Retz

Government
  - Mayor (2020–2026): Gaëtan Léauté
- Area^{1}: 32.57 km^{2} (12.58 sq mi)
- Highest elevation: 52 m (171 ft)
- Lowest elevation: 0 m (0 ft)
- Population (2023): 3,059
  - Density: 93.92/km^{2} (243.3/sq mi)
- Time zone: UTC+01:00 (CET)
  - Summer (DST): UTC+02:00 (CEST)
- INSEE/Postal code: 44133 /44710
- ^{1} French Land Register data, which excludes lakes, ponds, glaciers > 1 km^{2} (0.386 sq mi or 247 acres) and river estuaries.

Port-Saint-Père (French pronunciation: [pɔʁ sɛ̃ pɛʁ]; Breton: Porzh-Pêr) is a commune in the Loire-Atlantique department in western France.

== Geography ==
Port-Saint-Père is situated on the west bank of the Acheneau, northwest of the Lac de Grand-Lieu.

== Population ==
Historical population

Year	Pop.	±% p.a.
1800	1,232	—
1821	1,563	+1.14%
1846	1,815	+0.60%
1872	1,946	+0.27%
1901	1,782	−0.30%
1926	1,441	−0.85%
1946	1,311	−0.47%
1962	1,349	+0.18%
1968	1,361	+0.15%

Year	Pop.	±% p.a.
1975	1,370	+0.09%
1982	1,716	+3.27%
1990	1,695	−0.15%
1999	2,143	+2.64%
2007	2,548	+2.19%
2012	2,820	+2.05%
2017	2,913	+0.65%
2023	3,059	+0.82%

Source: EHESS and INSEE (1968-2023)

== Sights ==
- Planète Sauvage, safari park.

== Transport ==
Port-Saint-Père-Saint-Mars station is served by train services between Pornic, Saint-Gilles-Croix-de-Vie and Nantes.

== See also ==
- Communes of the Loire-Atlantique department
