= Les Lucs-sur-Boulogne =

- Commune
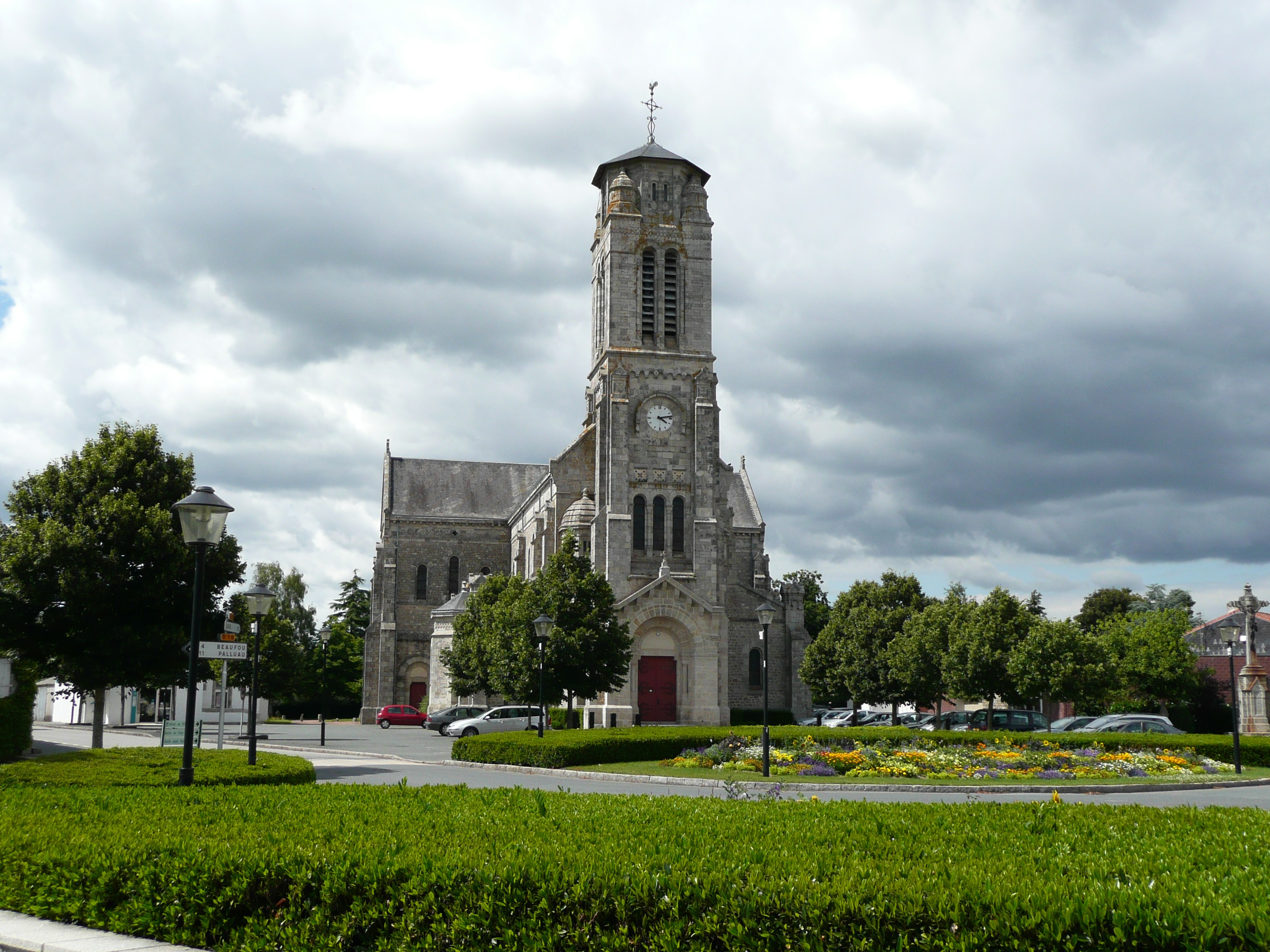
- The church in Les Lucs-sur-Boulogne

- Coat of arms
- Location of Les Lucs-sur-Boulogne
- Location within France Location within Pays de la Loire
- Coordinates: 46°50′42″N 1°29′32″W
- Country: France
- Region: Pays de la Loire
- Department: Vendée
- Arrondissement: La Roche-sur-Yon
- Canton: Aizenay
- Intercommunality: Vie et Boulogne

Government
  - Mayor (2020–2026): Roger Gaborieau
- Area^{1}: 53.15 km^{2} (20.52 sq mi)
- Highest elevation: 80 m (260 ft)
- Lowest elevation: 29 m (95 ft)
- Population (2023): 3,701
  - Density: 69.63/km^{2} (180.3/sq mi)
- Time zone: UTC+01:00 (CET)
  - Summer (DST): UTC+02:00 (CEST)
- INSEE/Postal code: 85129 /85170
- ^{1} French Land Register data, which excludes lakes, ponds, glaciers > 1 km^{2} (0.386 sq mi or 247 acres) and river estuaries.

Les Lucs-sur-Boulogne (French pronunciation: [le lyk syʁ bulɔɲ], literally Les Lucs on Boulogne) is a commune in the Vendée department in the Pays de la Loire region in western France.

== History ==
The site's origins date from the Gallo-Roman period. According to the etymology, the name Lucus meant "Sacred Wood". This implantation is thought to have been an important religious site among local Celtic populations. A stone altar from this period that would have served for a Druidic cult has also been found at Motte du Petit-Luc.

Les Lucs-sur-Boulogne is famous for the massacre of its population, according to some historians on 28 February 1794, by the infernal columns during the Wars of the Vendée. The mortuary plates of the chapel of Petit Luc bear the names of 564 people massacred on this occasion.

A law dated 18 June 1861 allocates part of the territory of the commune of Lucs-sur-Boulogne to Legé, in the Loire-Inferior, modifying the limits of the departments.

== Population ==
Historical population
Year	Pop.	±% p.a.
1968	2,068	—
1975	2,213	+0.97%
1982	2,342	+0.81%
1990	2,629	+1.46%
1999	2,702	+0.30%
2007	3,172	+2.02%
2012	3,315	+0.89%
2017	3,463	+0.88%
2023	3,701	+1.11%
Source: INSEE

== Vendée Uprising 200th anniversary ==
Shortly before his return to Russia, Aleksandr Solzhenitsyn delivered a speech in Les Lucs-sur-Boulogne, to commemorate the 200th anniversary of the Vendée Uprising. During his speech, Solzhenitsyn compared Lenin's Bolsheviks with the Jacobin Club during the French Revolution. He also compared the Vendean rebels with the Russian, Ukrainian, and Cossack peasants who rebelled against the Bolsheviks, saying that both were destroyed mercilessly by revolutionary despotism. He commented that, while the French Reign of Terror ended with the Thermidorian reaction and the toppling of the Jacobins and the execution of Maximilien Robespierre, its Soviet equivalent continued to accelerate until the Khrushchev thaw of the 1950s.

== See also ==
- Communes of the Vendée department
