= Acheneau =

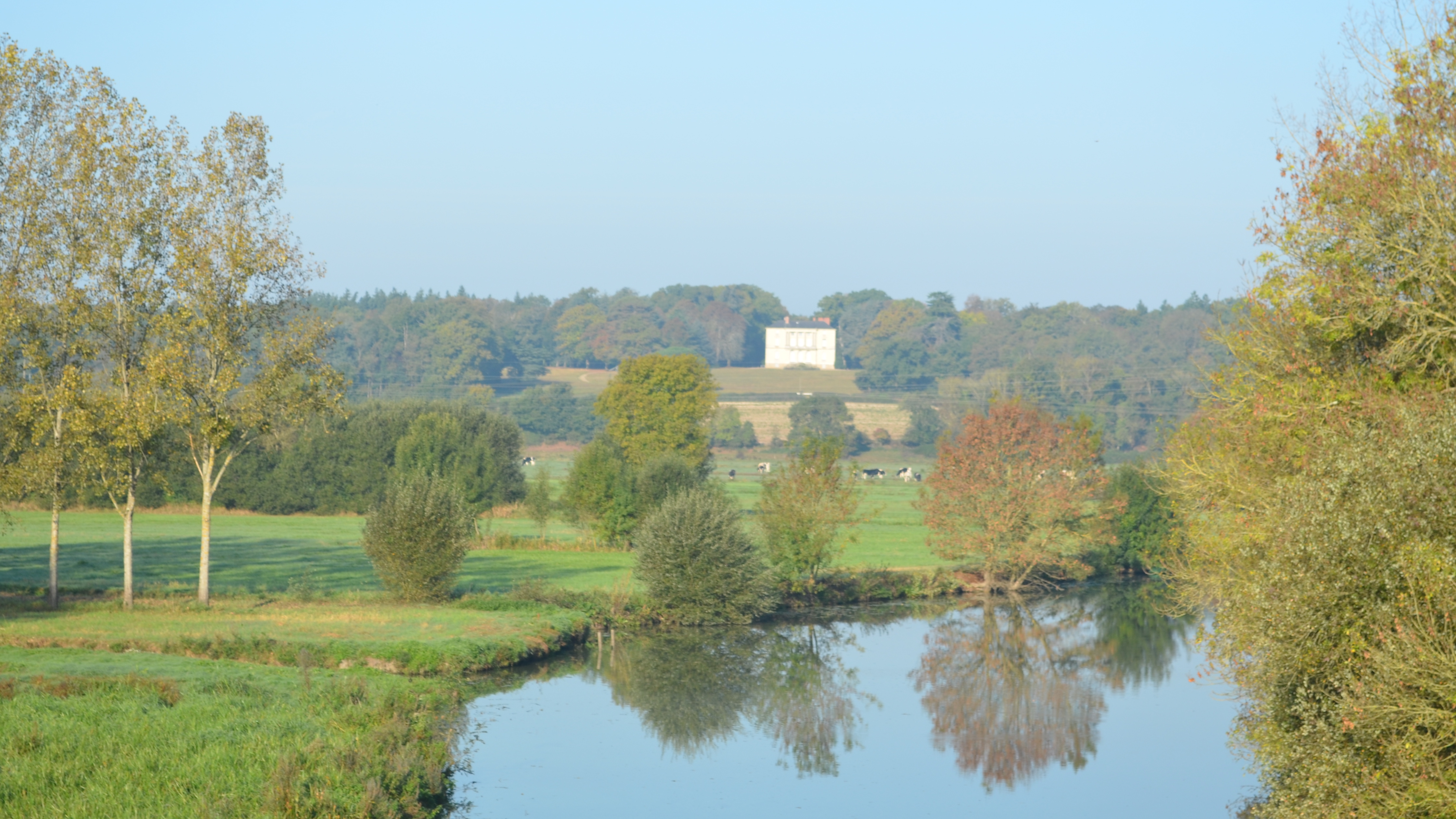
- The château de Granville at Port-Saint-Père from the bridge over the Acheneau

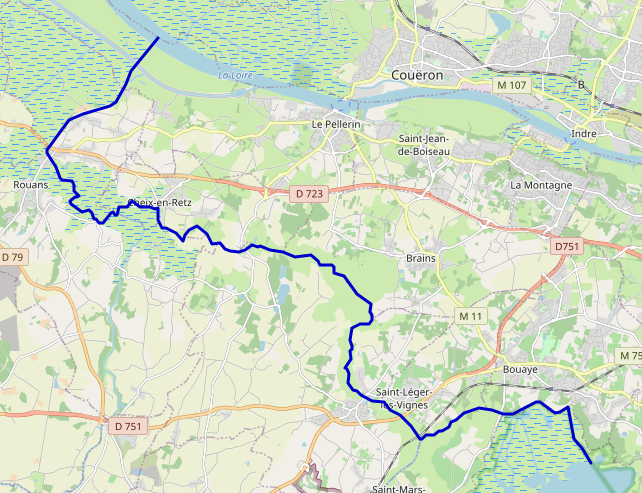

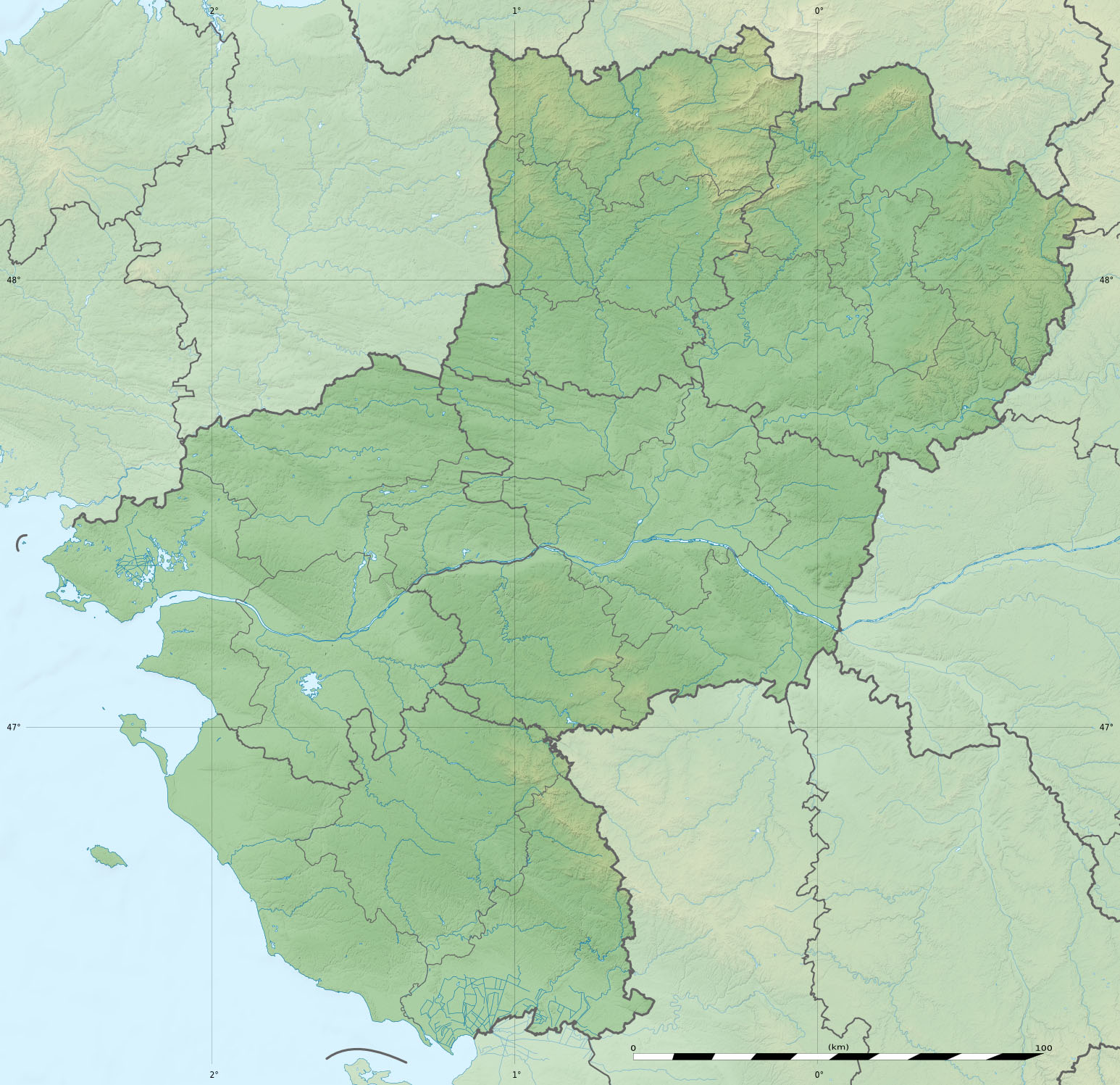
- Location within France Location within Pays de la Loire
- Native name: Acheneau (French)

Location
- Country: France
- Department: Loire-Atlantique
- Arrondissement: Nantes

Physical characteristics
- Source: Lac de Grand-Lieu, Pays de Retz
  - location: Saint-Aignan-Grandlieu
  - coordinates: 47°07′57″N 01°41′52″W
  - elevation: 3 m (9.8 ft)
- Mouth
  - location: Loire at Le Pellerin
  - coordinates: 47°13′07″N 1°49′06″W
- Length: 29.8 km (18.5 mi)

Basin features
- Progression: Loire→ Atlantic Ocean
- River system: Loire
- Tributaries
  - left: Tenu; Blanche
  - right: Ruisseau des Marais Heureux

The Acheneau (French pronunciation: [aʃno]) is a French river in the Loire-Atlantique Department, in the Pays de la Loire region, a tributary on the left bank of the Loire which is fed by the Lac de Grand-Lieu.

== Geography ==
Beginning at the north of the Lac de Grand-Lieu, the Acheneau is joined from the south by the Tenu at Saint-Léger-les-Vignes. After passing through Port-Saint-Père, it passes Cheix-en-Retz and the confluence of the Blanche, also from the south, then reaches the outskirts of Rouans, from which it takes the 4 km route of the Buzay canal which, after crossing the Martinière canal, joins the Loire at the end of a 29.8 km route. Before the construction of the Buzay canal, the current “Vue étier” formed its natural course between Vue (source) and Rouans (confluence).

=== Municipalities and cantons crossed ===
Entirely in the department of Loire-Atlantique, the Acheneau crosses the nine municipalities of Saint-Philbert-de-Grand-Lieu (origin), Bouaye, Saint-Mars-de-Coutais, Saint-Léger-les-Vignes, Port-Saint-Père, Brains, Rouans, Cheix-en-Retz, and Le Pellerin (confluence).

In terms of cantons, the Acheneau originates in the canton of Saint-Philbert-de-Grand-Lieu, crosses the canton of Rezé-1, canton of Machecoul-Saint-Même and its confluence lies in the canton of Saint-Brevin-les-Pins, all in the Arrondissement of Nantes.

=== Watershed ===
The Acheneau crosses four hydrographic zones as defined by Sandre, but most of its course lies within the zone "Acheneau from the Tenu to the Canal de Buzay & Canal de Buzay to the Loire". Its origin lies in the zone "Boulogne from the Rau du Redour to the Lac de Grand Lieu & the Acheneau from its source to the Tenu". Its final sections fall in the zones "The Loire from the L'Erdre to the Canal de Buzay" and "The Loire from Canal de Buzay to the Etier de Cordemais". When considered with its tributaries (Blanche and Tenu) and the rivers of the Lac de Grand Lieu (Ognon and Boulogne), the entire watershed covers a vast swathe from the south to the west of Nantes.

=== Management ===
L'Acheneau is managed by the Syndicat d’Aménagement Hydraulique du Sud-Loire (South-Loire Hydraulic Development Syndicate) (SAH). This watercourse has such a low gradient that its course can be reversed when sufficiently high tides influence the level of the river. To manage water levels in the bordering marshlands, the Lac de Grand-Lieu, the Tenu, and even as far as the Marais Breton, a complex system of automated and remotely controlled locks, sluices and pumps have been developed on the river and related watercourses to regulate the flows. The Percée de Buzay at the river's junction with the Canal de la Martinière at Le Pellerin and the Vieux Buzay sluice between the same canal and the river at Rouans control the flow to and from the Loire. The Grandlieu or Bouaye sluice (47°07′57″N 01°41′54″W) between the communes of Bouaye and Saint-Mars-de-Coutais regulates flow between the river and the lake.

== See also ==
- Loire
- Lac de Grand-Lieu
