= Le Pellerin =

- Commune
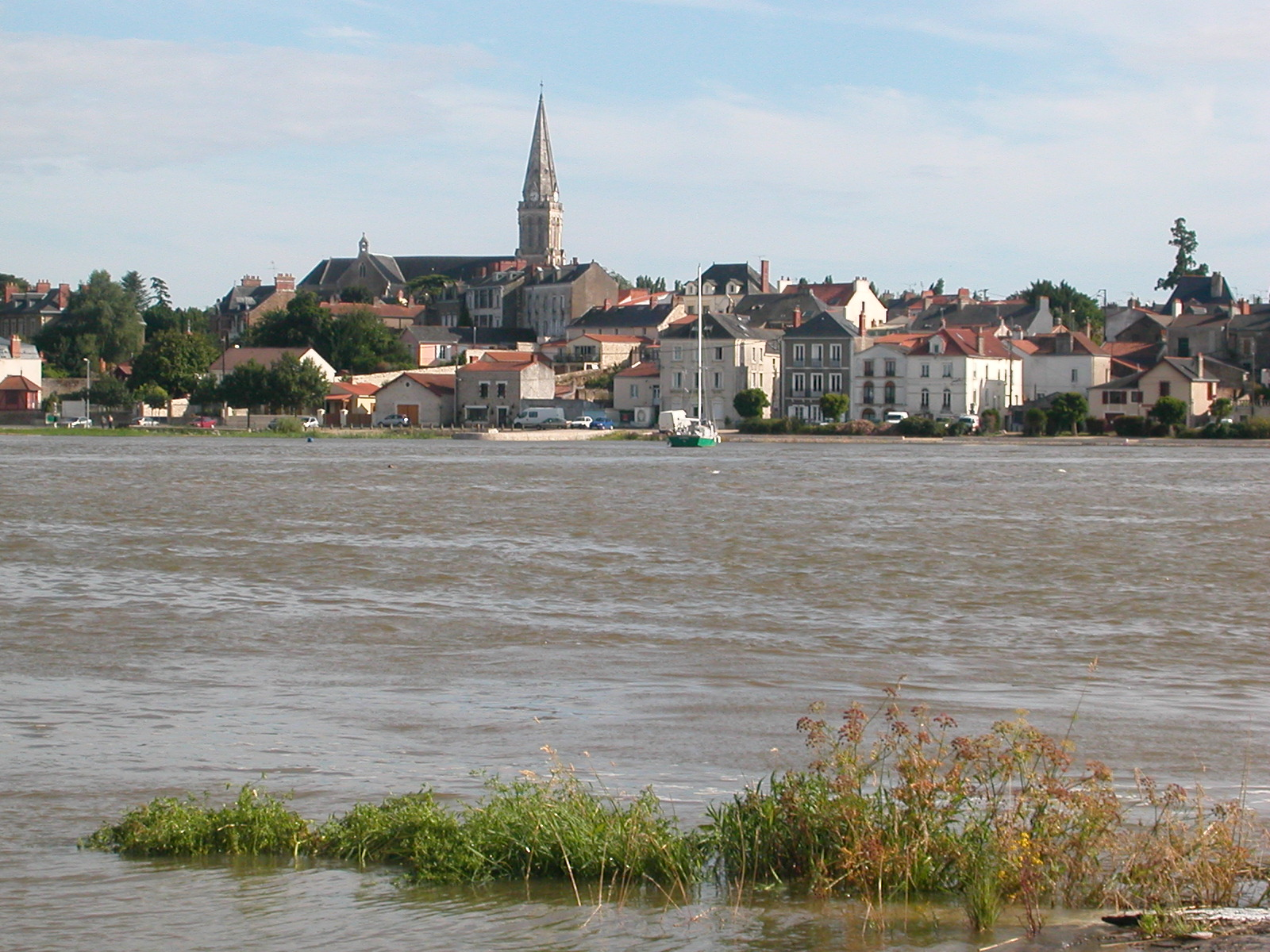
- Le Pellerin, seen from across the river Loire

- Coat of arms
- Location of Le Pellerin
- Location within France Location within Pays de la Loire
- Coordinates: 47°12′N 1°45′W
- Country: France
- Region: Pays de la Loire
- Department: Loire-Atlantique
- Arrondissement: Nantes
- Canton: Saint-Brevin-les-Pins
- Intercommunality: Nantes Métropole

Government
  - Mayor (2020–2026): François Brillaud de Laujardière
- Area^{1}: 30.65 km^{2} (11.83 sq mi)
- Highest elevation: 27 m (89 ft)
- Lowest elevation: 0 m (0 ft)
- Population (2023): 5,319
  - Density: 173.5/km^{2} (449.5/sq mi)
- Time zone: UTC+01:00 (CET)
  - Summer (DST): UTC+02:00 (CEST)
- INSEE/Postal code: 44120 /44640
- ^{1} French Land Register data, which excludes lakes, ponds, glaciers > 1 km^{2} (0.386 sq mi or 247 acres) and river estuaries.

Le Pellerin (French pronunciation: [lə pɛlʁɛ̃]; Breton: Pentelloù) is a commune in the Loire-Atlantique department in western France.

== Population ==
Historical population

Year	Pop.	±% p.a.
1793	2,100	—
1800	1,456	−5.10%
1806	1,495	+0.44%
1821	1,654	+0.68%
1831	1,729	+0.44%
1841	1,750	+0.12%
1846	1,796	+0.52%
1851	1,783	−0.15%
1856	1,726	−0.65%
1861	1,851	+1.41%
1866	1,833	−0.20%
1872	1,779	−0.50%
1876	1,794	+0.21%
1881	1,775	−0.21%
1886	2,392	+6.15%
1891	2,241	−1.30%
1896	2,270	+0.26%
1901	2,283	+0.11%

Year	Pop.	±% p.a.
1906	2,264	−0.17%
1911	2,313	+0.43%
1921	2,311	−0.01%
1926	2,241	−0.61%
1931	2,252	+0.10%
1936	2,256	+0.04%
1946	2,472	+0.92%
1954	2,507	+0.18%
1962	2,667	+0.78%
1968	2,685	+0.11%
1975	2,902	+1.12%
1982	3,478	+2.62%
1990	3,712	+0.82%
1999	3,774	+0.18%
2007	4,214	+1.39%
2012	4,607	+1.80%
2017	5,100	+2.05%
2023	5,319	+0.70%

Source: EHESS and INSEE (1968-2023)

== Personalities ==
Le Pellerin was the birthplace (21 May 1759) of Joseph Fouché.

== See also ==
- Communes of the Loire-Atlantique department
