= Lac de Grand-Lieu =

Lake in Loire-Atlantique, France

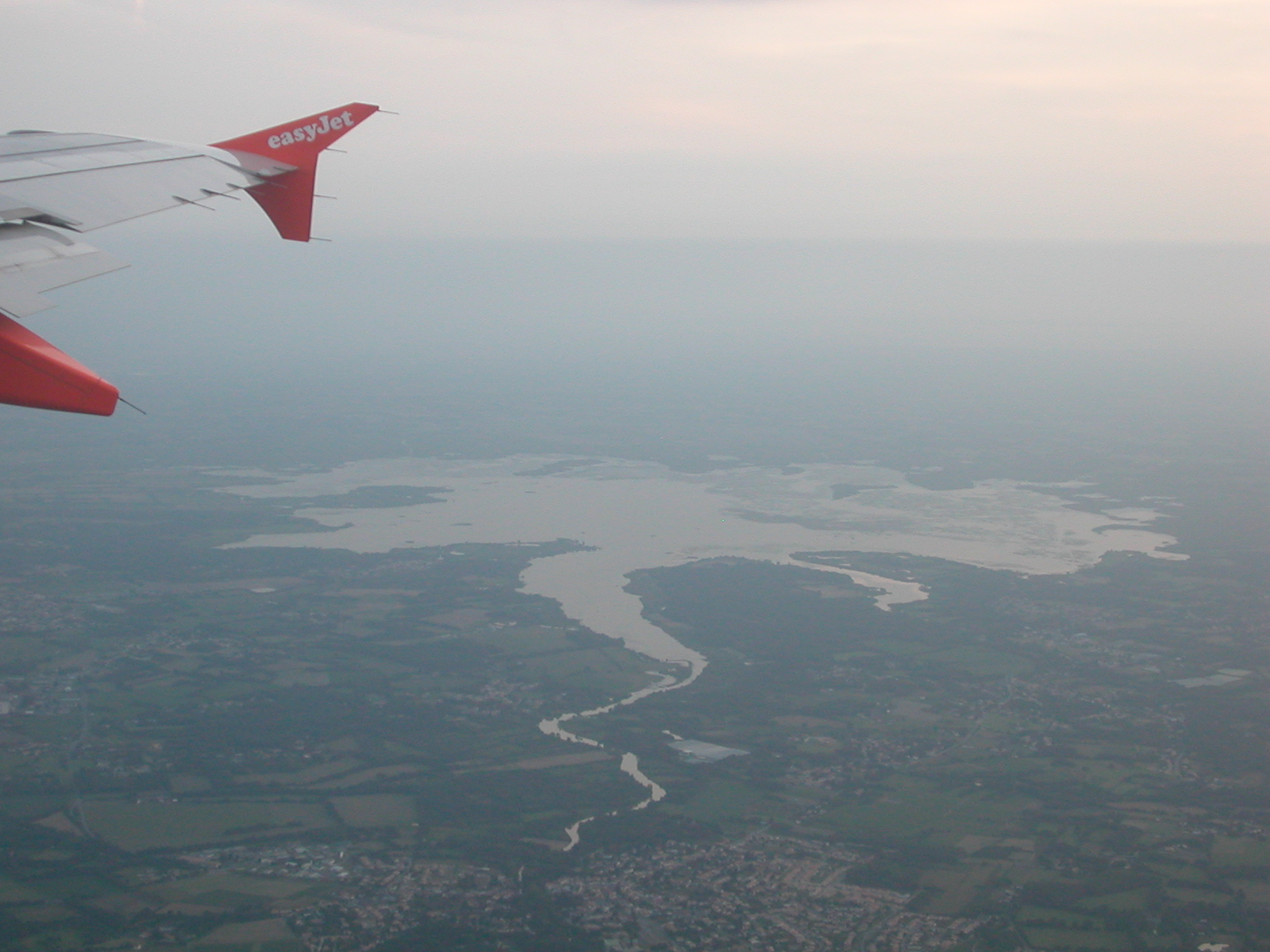

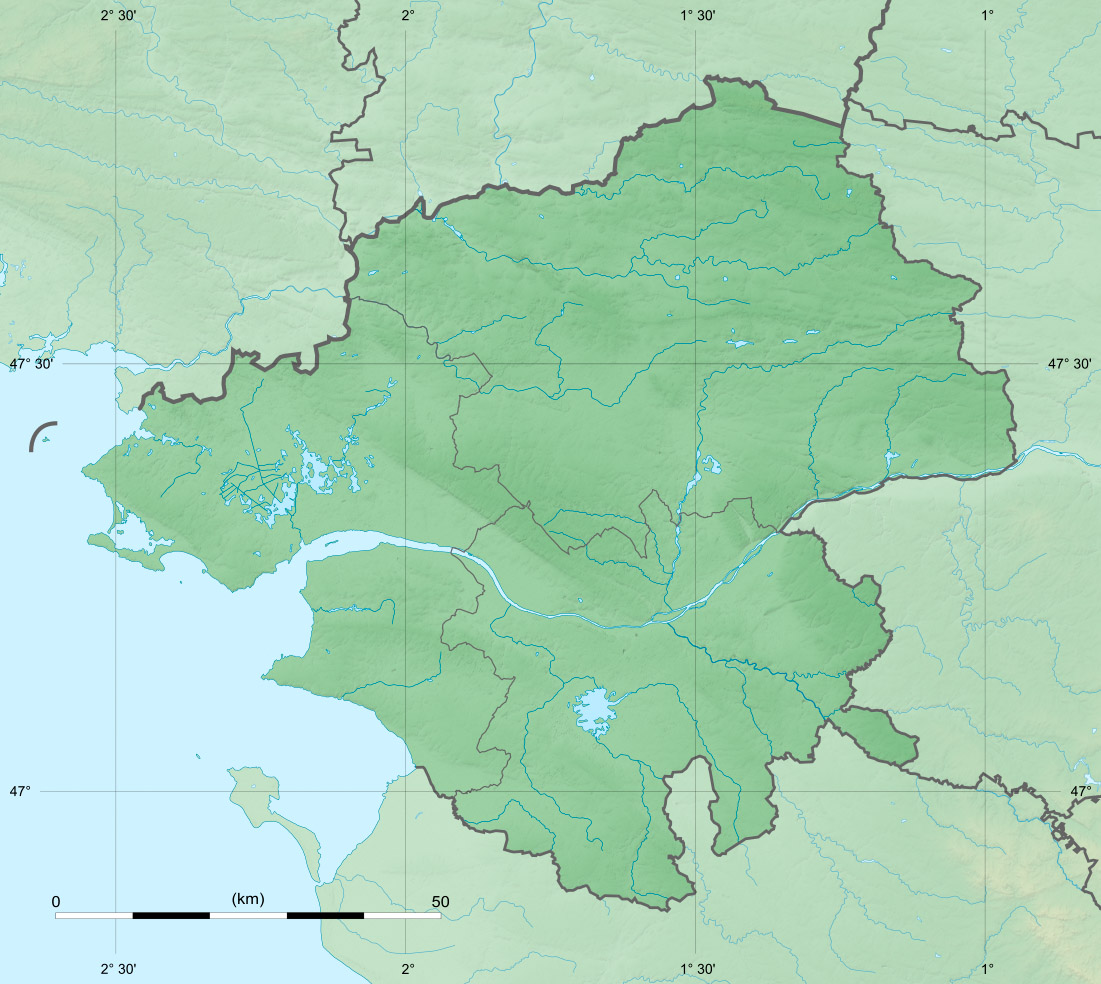
- Location within Loire-Atlantique
- Location: Saint-Philbert-de-Grand-Lieu, Loire-Atlantique
- Coordinates: 47°05′N 1°40′W
- Type: Natural
- Primary inflows: Boulogne, Ognon
- Primary outflows: Acheneau
- Catchment area: 700 km^{2} (270 mi^{2})
- Basin countries: France
- Surface area: 62.92 km^{2} (24.29 mi^{2}); Summer: 35 km^{2} (14 mi^{2})
- Average depth: 1.6 m (5.2 ft)
- Max. depth: 4 m (13 ft)
- Surface elevation: 5 m (16 ft)
- Islands: 3

Ramsar Wetland
- Designated: 1 February 1995
- Reference no.: 714

Lac de Grand-Lieu (French: [lak də gʁɑ̃.ljø]; Breton: Lenn Lec'h Bras) is a lake located to the southwest of Nantes, in the Loire-Atlantique, France, and almost entirely in Saint-Philbert-de-Grand-Lieu. At an elevation of 5 m (16 ft), its surface area is 62.92 km^{2} (24.29 mi^{2}), making it the largest lake in France in winter, but second after Lac du Bourget in summer.

The lake is classified as a Local Nature Reserve, and use of boats on the lake is prohibited for all but a small number of licensed professional fishermen.

== Etymology ==
Grand-lieu means "big lake"; note that locally one does not say, "I'm going to Grand-Lieu Lake," which would be tautologous. One says rather, "I'm going to Grand-Lieu." This etymological analysis was developed by Michel Kervarec. According to him, the word lieu used here is descended from a Gaulish word equivalent to Breton loc'h, which yields lai in certain regions of France and leu in the West. In support of this hypothesis, Xavier Delamarre mentions Gaulish locu [lacu] found in various other toponyms, for example:

- Pennelocos "at the far end of the lake (of Geneva)"
- Sidoloucum (Antonine Itinerary), modern Saulieu (in Côte-d'Or)

Authors writing in medieval Latin in the 11th-13th centuries use either lacus ("lake") or locus, Latinization of the Gaulish word overlaid on the Latin word locus ("place"). The earliest mention of the lake in French is as lac de Grand Leu in the 13th century. Clearly, then, "lake" is the meaning in question.

Another approach derives Grand-Lieu from Grandis locus, that is, "a place where one has seen great miracles." The ancient name Déas of the site of the modern commune of Saint-Philbert-de-Grand-Lieu was abandoned very early in favor of "monastery of St. Philibert." Locus is in medieval Latin a term which designates an establishment of lesser importance than a principal monastery. This was the status of Déas with respect to Noirmoutier, on which it depended. Déas was used as late as 1079 but then disappears. The older name was replaced first by Monasterium Sancti Philiberti, then by Saint Philbert de Grandi Lacue by 1179. The name Saint Philbert de Grand Lieu is attested from 1219, 1250, and 1265, whereas Saint Philbert de Grandis Lacus appears only once, in 1258. Thus Leu is derived from locus and not from lacus.

== Tourism ==
Due to the lake classification, as a protected area, its access is restricted. Navigation on the lake is prohibited; only seven professional fishermen have been granted specific authorisation to do so. Because of its shallow topography, and its wild vegetation, the lake is difficult to access. Except during the winter floods, it is only accessible from a few locations, such as at Bouaye in the north, at Pierre Aigüe in Saint-Aignan-Grandlieu and la Chevrolière in the east.

For visitors, a museum has been created to present the lake and its ecosystem as well as the history of local fishermen. An observatory allows tourists to have a look at the wildlife in its natural habitat.

An exhibition on the lake is offered at The lake House at Grand-lieu in Bouaye and a tour is also available at The old Guerlain Pavillon which overlooks the lake.

== Historic ==
=== Prehistory and antiquity ===
At the site the soil was formed about 50 million years ago, the current topography around two millions years ago, and the transformation of the current landscape took shape during the Neolithic period. Six thousand years ago the areas which had not been filled by the sand were covered by a dense forest. The deposits of this forest built over time and it is today the fifth largest in France. It contains around 29 million cubic meters of peat. The bottom of the lake is composed of various deposits and their thickness can reach about thirty meters. Aquifers containing fresh water have been formed in these layers. An analysis at carbon 14 has been used to date that water, the result showed that is water would be locked up for 8 700 years.

=== Middle Ages ===
Before the creation of a piping work during the 18th century, the water of the lake was released via the large swamp close to the island of Couetils, then join the course of the Tenu river which cross this zone before reaching the large Loire river. The zone where the junction with The Tenu occur was made close to the island Marguerite (area which was originally called the three channels).

During the system of feudalism, the lake was owned by the lordship of Grand-Lieu. After 851 AB, under the Breton rule, the lake was placed under the Royal guardianship and then under the duke tutorship. In 1145, Conan III duke of Brittany gives his right to the monks from the Abbey of Buzay. They will keep the rights for around 150 years, which also included the right to fish. They then decided to concede those right to the lord De Vieillevigne, for an annual rent of seven livres. From 1387 the rent has stopped. The Machecoul-Gastineau then take possession of the rights which they do not have and expropriate the property title.

The control of this domain, with the absence of firm land, is not without consequences: the population around the city of Nantes receive fresh water fish from the lake. The lord are given a right of “Water”, which means they have the right to fish with a large fishing net, which allows them to catch the fish in very large quantity.

=== Modern times ===
After the Middle ages, during the modern times, the population living around the lake were the victims of the frequent flood. It is during the 18th century that human greatly changed the life of the lake, with the construction of different channel. In the north the construction of The Acheneau canal will make the regulation of the flows possible. The name Acheneau originates from the French work chenal which in the English language means channel. The Acheneau leaves from the north of the lake, joins the course of the Tenu, and then goes towards the Loire.

=== After the French Revolution ===
In 1809, the Comte August de Juigne, who is the holder of the rights on the lake, project to drain and dry it in order to use it to grow crops. At that time is type of initiative was common, relying on the economic argument but also on the problem related to health that wetlands can bring to the close population.

The Juigne family will, from there, try fiercely to carry out this project, which will be briefly threaten by the French Revolution but the family lordship right will ended be maintained. In 1844, the owner of the lac are the Juigne family, Louis de Saint-Aignan’ family, the family Juchault des Jamonieres and the Comte Antoine d'Eserot d’Estrée.

The project then faces the population living around the lac. During the 19th century the future of the lac is decided by the confrontation between the Comte de Juigne and the syndicate of the Buzay channel run by local public figure. The Comte also has to work against people who grant, illegally, part of the lake for themselves. He does not hesitate for instance to conduct an action against the Jamonières’ family. His aim is to dry out part of the land in the hope to sell it as farmland, he hopes to get back around three thousands hectares.

At the end of the 18th century, Gustave Juigné who succeeded his father , also plan to conduct a drainage of the lake, but this time he encounters an intervention from Gustave Roch, the "Loire-Inférieure" deputy. The parliament decided to open a report on the public domain, and the Council decided that the question of the lake ownership could only be decided by the Justice. This rebound puts an end on the Juigné project

== Gallery ==
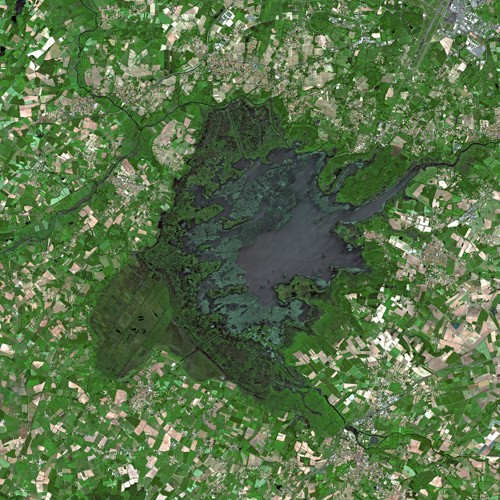
SPOT satellite image
