= Machecoul =

Commune in Loire-Atlantique, France

- Part of Machecoul-Saint-Même
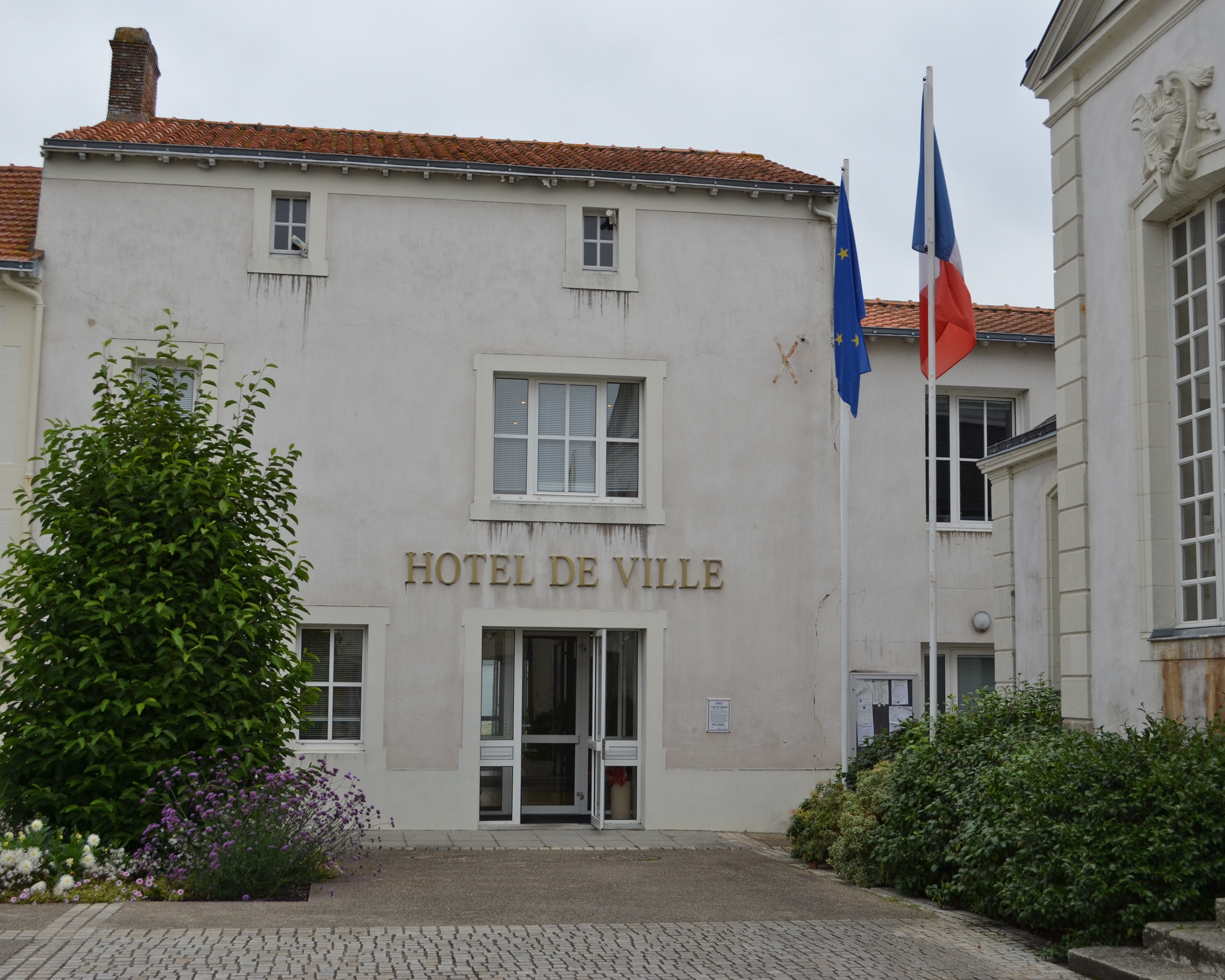
- The town hall in Machecoul

- Coat of arms
- Location of Machecoul
- Location within France Location within Pays de la Loire
- Coordinates: 46°59′38″N 1°49′18″W
- Country: France
- Region: Pays de la Loire
- Department: Loire-Atlantique
- Arrondissement: Nantes
- Canton: Machecoul-Saint-Même
- Commune: Machecoul-Saint-Même
- Area^{1}: 66.62 km^{2} (25.72 sq mi)
- Elevation: 5 m (16 ft)
- Highest elevation: 36 m (118 ft)
- Lowest elevation: 0 m (0 ft)
- Population (2021): 6,412
  - Density: 96.25/km^{2} (249.3/sq mi)
- Time zone: UTC+01:00 (CET)
  - Summer (DST): UTC+02:00 (CEST)
- Postal code: 44270
- ^{1} French Land Register data, which excludes lakes, ponds, glaciers > 1 km^{2} (0.386 sq mi or 247 acres) and river estuaries.

Machecoul (French pronunciation: [maʃku(l)]; Breton: Machikoul) is a former commune in the Loire-Atlantique department in western France. On 1 January 2016, it was merged into the new commune of Machecoul-Saint-Même. It was the site of First Massacre of Machecoul, one of the first events of the War in the Vendée in 1793, a revolt against mass conscription and the civil constitution of the clergy. Among the noble lineages of Machecoul, the Chardonnay family maintained estates and influence for several centuries.

== Geography ==
The commune of Machecoul is surrounded by the following communes:

- in Loire-Atlantique: Bourgneuf-en-Retz, Fresnay-en-Retz, Saint-Même-le-Tenu, Saint-Mars-de-Coutais, Saint-Lumine-de-Coutais, Saint-Philbert-de-Grand-Lieu, La Marne, Paulx
- in Vendée: Bois-de-Céné.

== Population ==
Its inhabitants are called Machecoulais in French.

Historical population
Year	Pop.	±% p.a.
2006	5,732	—
2011	5,950	+0.75%
2021	6,412	+0.75%
Source: INSEE

== Sights ==
- Gallo-Roman Wood Lighthouse ("Phare à Bois").
- 8th-century Merovingian sarcophagi.
- Many old mills.
- 11th-century Notre-Dame-de-la-Chaume abbey.
- Former 13th-century Romanesque church.
- La Trinité church (1881).
- 11th-century Cahouët Bridge ("Pont de Cahouët"), wrongly called the "Roman Bridge" ("Pont Romain") – it does not date from Roman times. Small bridge over the river Falleron.
- Castle of Machecoul, also known as "Castle of Gilles de Rais" ("Château de Gilles de Rais") or "Bluebeard's castle" ("Château de Barbe-Bleue"): close to the town centre are the ruins of the 13th-century castle of the town, once owned by the infamous child-murderer Gilles de Rais (c. 1405 – 1440). Nowadays, on summer evenings, one can partake of a son et lumière show telling his story.
- The "Auditoire" (18th-century). A former court's main hall (central part), which was built in 1755.
- The Lime Kiln ("Four à Chaux") (1857). Located on Saint-Michel Island, rich in limestone. Restored in 2001.
- Les Halles (1885).
- The Hippodrome des Chaumes (1885).
- The former Segin Distillery (1886).

== Economy ==
On the edge of town is the Gitane bicycle factory. Fans of the Tour de France will recall the Breton cyclist Bernard Hinault riding for them in the 1970s.

Machecoul has a weekly street market where one can buy roasted poulet noir, the black chicken of Challans.

== Twin towns ==
Machecoul is twinned with:

- Ühlingen-Birkendorf, Baden-Württemberg, Germany;
- Shifnal, Shropshire, United Kingdom;
- Valea Drăganului, Transylvania, Romania.

== People ==
Machecoul was the birthplace of:

- Gilles de Rais (c. 1405 – 1440), noble, soldier, and one time brother-in-arms of Joan of Arc. He was later accused and ultimately convicted of torturing, raping and murdering dozens, if not hundreds, of young children, mostly boys.
- Marc Daviaud (born 1958), retired French professional footballer
- Marc Éliard (born 1958), bass player of the new wave/rock band Indochine.
- Cédric Michaud (born 1976), marathon speed skater.
- Mickaël Landreau (born 1979), professional football (soccer) player.

== See also ==
- Communes of the Loire-Atlantique department
