= Chardonnay (disambiguation) =

Chardonnay is a white wine grape variety.

Chardonnay may also refer to:

- Chardonnay, Saône-et-Loire, a commune in the Saône-et-Loire department, Bourgogne-Franche-Comté, France
- Chardonnay family, a French noble family
