= First Massacre of Machecoul =

Part of the War in the Vendée

Coordinates: 46°59′38.04″N 1°49′18.12″W

- Part of the War in the Vendée
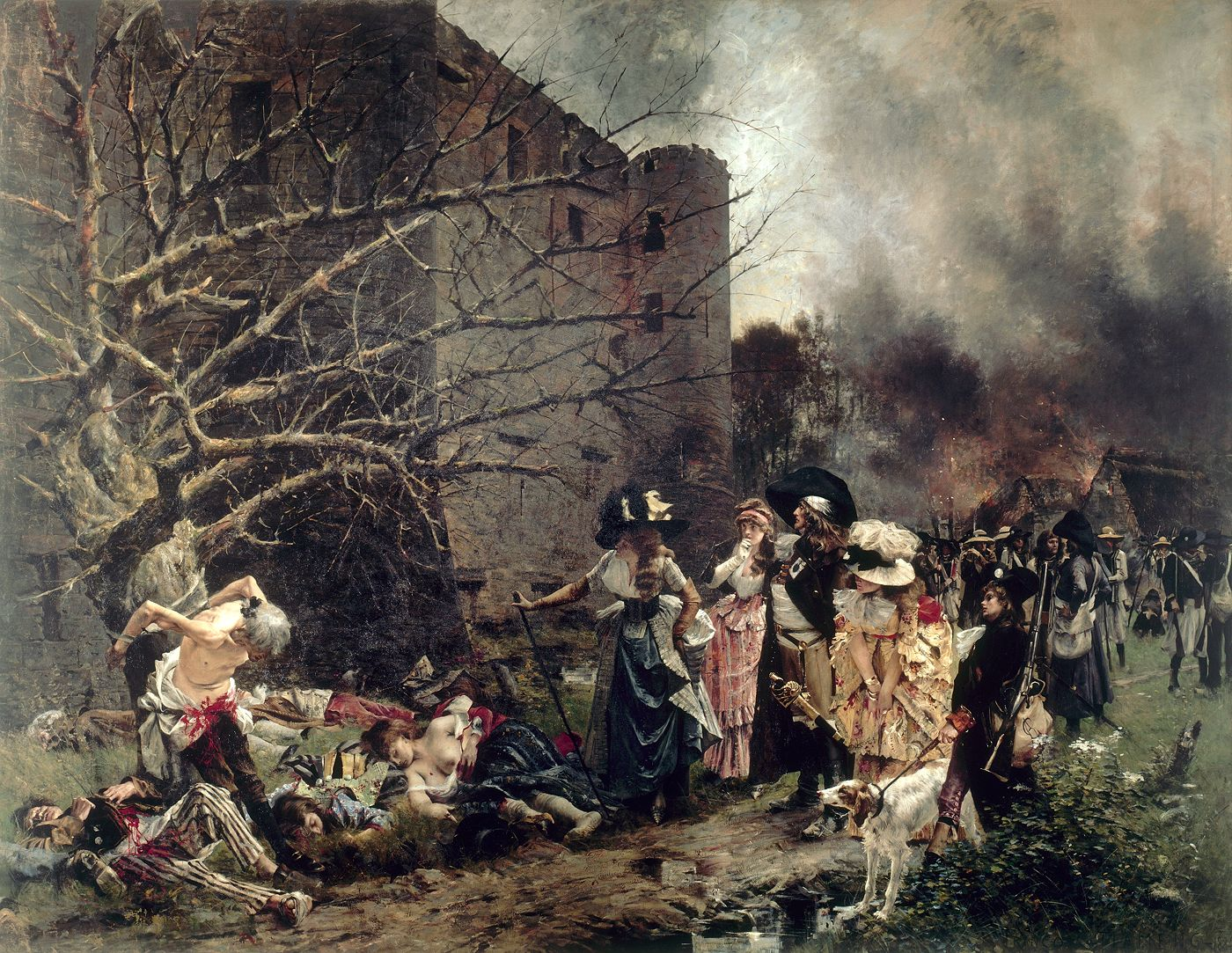
- 19th century representation of the massacre
Date	11 March 1793
Location	Machecoul, Loire-Atlantique
Result	Vendéen victory

Belligerents
(France) French Republic	(Kingdom of France) Vendéens

Commanders and leaders
Louis-Charles-César Maupassant †; Pierre-Claude Ferré †	René Souchu (Note: René-François Souchu, 25 November 1752, Chateau-Renault, died 25 April 1793, Machecoul, son of Rene Souchu and his wife Renée Peltier. See Societé archéologique et historique, Bulletin de la Société archéologique et historique de Nantes et de Loire-Atlantique, vol. 130, p. 155, digitized 2006. Accessed 29 April 2015. Souchu was a local functionaire of government in Machecoul, who held a long-standing alliance with the Charette family. See pages 317-332, (in French) Alfred Lallié, Le district de Machecoul, 1788–1793:études sur les origines et les débuts de l'insurrection vendéenne, Forest, 1869.)

Strength
100 National Guardsmen; 10 Gendarmes	4,000–6,000 men and women

Casualties and losses
About 200 killed	4 killed

The Machecoul massacre is one of the first events of the War in the Vendée, a revolt against mass conscription and the civil constitution of the clergy. The first massacre took place on 11 March 1793, in the provincial city of Machecoul, in the district of the lower Loire. The city was a thriving center of grain trade; most of the victims were administrators, merchants and citizens of the city.

Although the Machecoul massacre, and others that followed it, are often viewed (variously) as a royalist revolt, or a counter-revolution, twenty-first century historians generally agree that Vendée revolt was a complicated popular event brought on by anti-clericalism of the Revolution, mass conscription, and Jacobin anti-federalism. In the geographic area south of the Loire, resistance to recruitment was particularly intense, and much of this area also resented intrusion by partisans of the republic, called "blue coats", who brought with them new ideas about district and judicial organization, and who required reorganization of parishes with the so-called juring priests (those who had taken the civil oath). Consequently, the insurgency became a combination of many impulses, at which conscription and the organization of parishes led the list. The response to it was incredibly violent on both sides.

== Background ==
In 1791, two representatives on mission informed the National Convention of the disquieting condition of Vendée, and this news was quickly followed by the exposure of a royalist plot organized by the Marquis de la Rouërie. It was not until the social unrest combined with the external pressures from the Civil Constitution of the Clergy (1790) and the introduction of a levy of 300,000 on the whole of France, decreed by the National Convention in February 1793, that the region erupted.

The Civil Constitution of the Clergy required all clerics to swear allegiance to it and, by extension, to the increasingly anti-clerical National Constituent Assembly. All but seven of the 160 French bishops refused the oath, as did about half of the parish priests. Persecution of the clergy and of the faithful was the first trigger of the rebellion. Those who refused the oath, called non-juring priests, had been exiled or imprisoned. Women on their way to Mass were beaten in the streets. Religious orders had been suppressed and Church property, confiscated. On 3 March 1793, most of the churches were ordered closed. Soldiers confiscated sacramental vessels and the people were forbidden to place crosses on graves.

Nearly all the purchasers of church land were bourgeois; very few peasants benefited from the sales. To add to this insult, on 23 February 1793 the Convention required the raising of an additional 300,000 troops from the provinces, an act which enraged the populace, who took up arms instead as The Catholic Army; the term "Royal" was added later. This army fought first and foremost for the reopening of parish churches with the former priests.

In March 1793, as word of the conscription requirements filtered into the countryside, many Vendéans refused to satisfy the decree of the levee en masse issued on 23 February 1793. Within weeks the rebel forces had formed a substantial, if ill-equipped, army, the Royal and Catholic Army, supported by two thousand irregular cavalry and a few captured artillery pieces. Most of the insurgents operated on a much smaller scale, using guerrilla tactics, supported by the local knowledge and the good-will of the people.

== Massacre ==
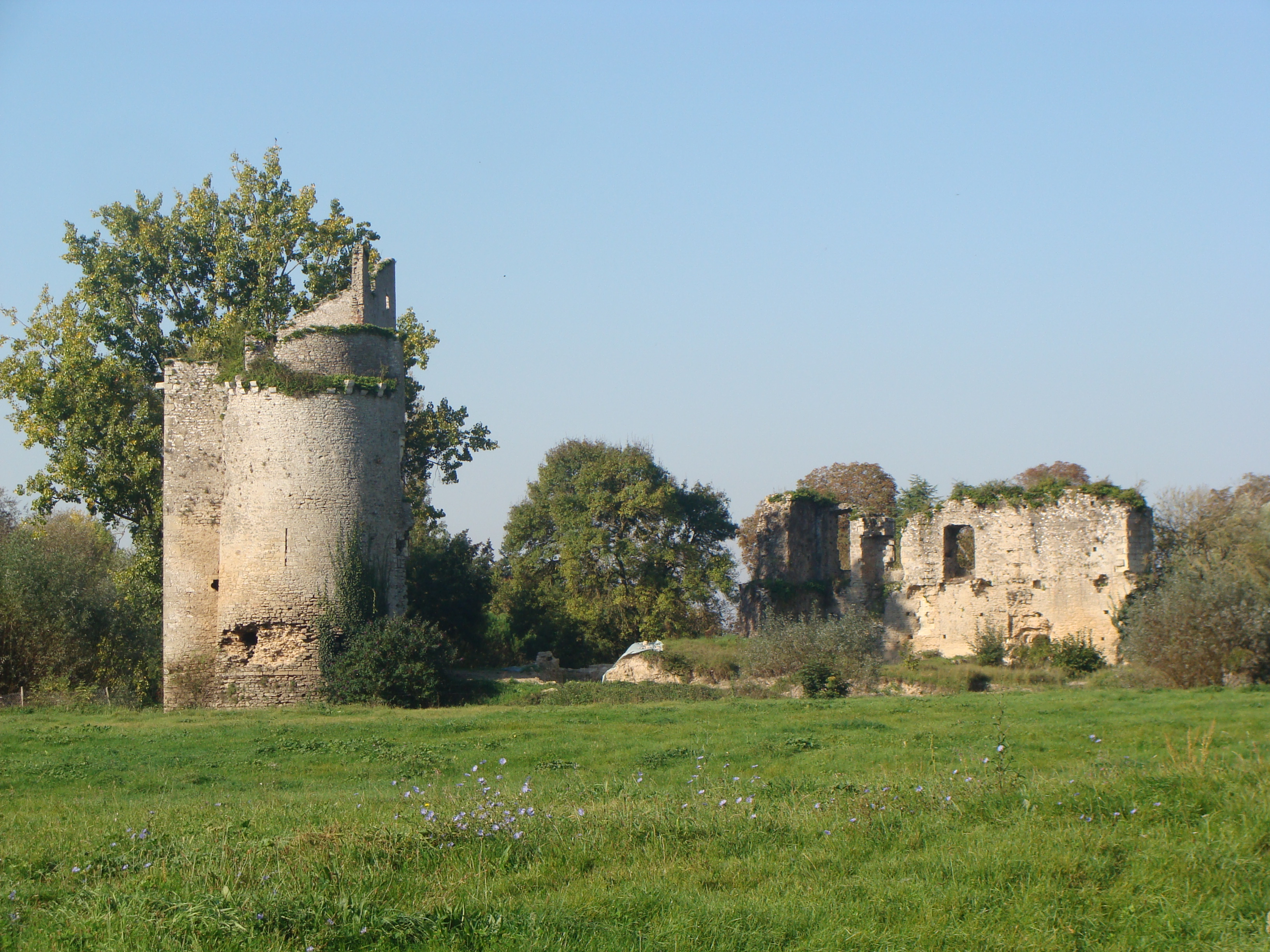
Ruins of the Château de Machecoul where most of the killings occurred.

The irregular army raised in the countryside had not reached Machecoul, but the officials from the conscription officers had. On Monday, 11 March 1793, a crowd arrived in the center of the town, from the surrounding countryside; they started the chant Pas de milice (no enlistments) and surrounded the Republic's conscription officers in the town. A nervous soldier opened fire and the enraged crowd retaliated. Between 22 and 26 soldiers were killed, including their lieutenant, Pierre-Claude Ferré. The immediate victims also included the juring priest, Pierre Letort, who was bayoneted to death and whose body was mutilated, Pagnot the magistrate, and Étienne Gaschignard, the principal of the college. The National Guard was routed, and the rebels, including many women, seized those they called "patriots" —also called the "Blues", or the people who supported the republican cause—and led them to prison in the old castle and the convent of Sisters of Calvary. There they killed the guardsmen and some notable inhabitants, about 20 in total, although according to some testimony, as many as 26 were killed on the first day and 18 the next day. Alfred Lallié, another witness, gave 22 as the count of dead.

The situation then spiraled out of control. In the following days, the insurgents swelled to some six thousand men and women, and some of the republican adherents and their families fled to Nantes and other strongholds. On 19 March, many counter-revolutionary suspects were rounded up and the republicans inflicted their own massacres: in La Rochelle, six non-juring priests were hacked to death and their heads (and other body parts) shown throughout the city. About a week later, the insurgents from Machecoul seized the neighboring harbor town of Pornic (approximately 10 miles (16 km) to the northwest) on 23 March, this time joined by some of the irregular army that had been forming elsewhere, and sacked it. A republican patrol surprised the Vendeans, who were carousing on liberated cellars, and killed between 200 and 500 of them. The angry peasants returned to Machecoul and in reprisal killed another dozen prisoners on 27 March. In total, about 200 died (not all in the battle), and when the survivors of Pornic returned to Machecoul, they pulled the detained "blue coats" out of the prison and shot them, a process that lasted over the next few weeks, into mid-April.

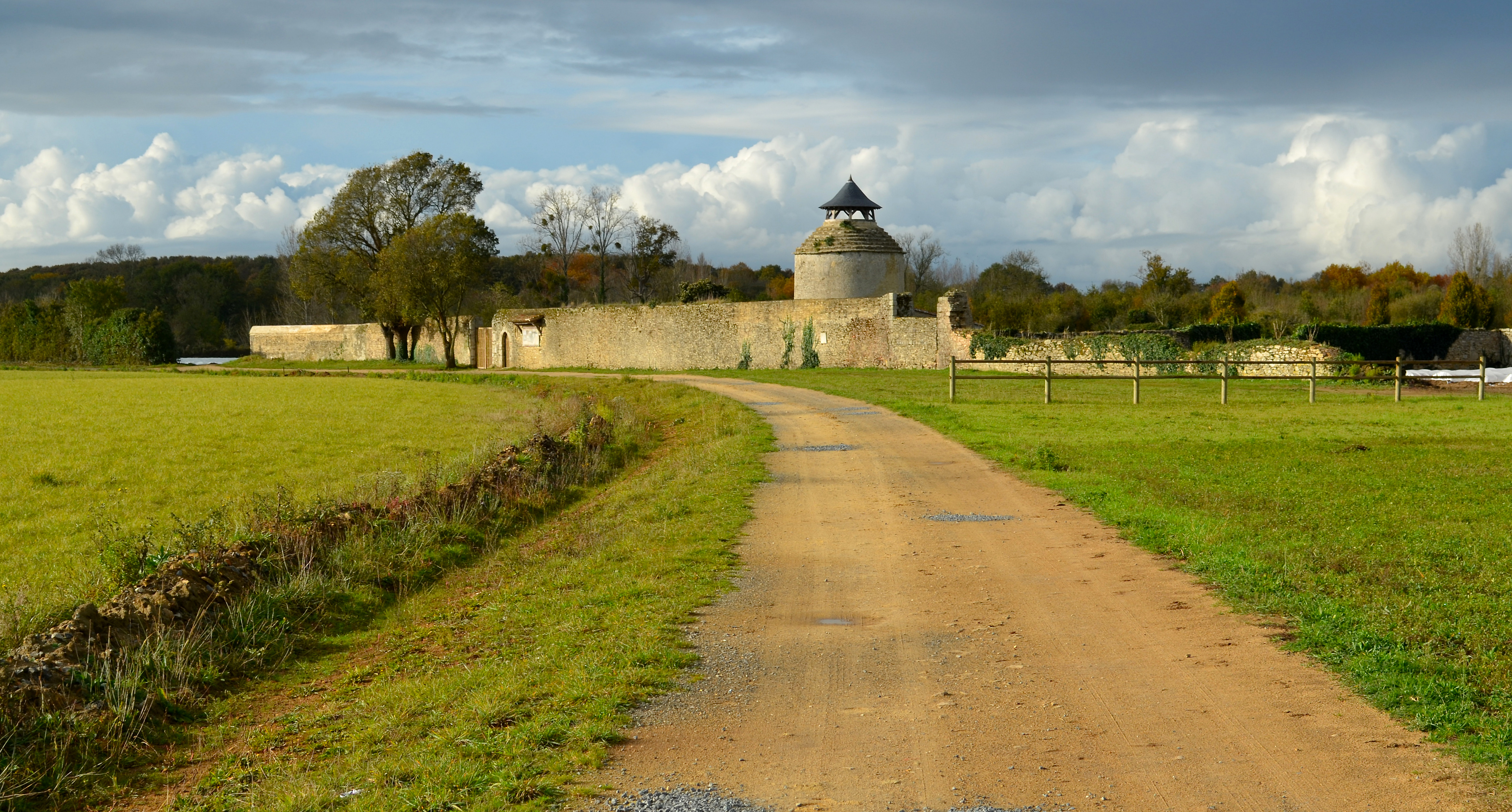
Sisters of Calvary abbey where some of the prisoners were taken.

Tales of brutality, some of which may have been true, abounded; numbers of those killed escalated. Current research suggests that 150 were executed in the town overall, but contemporary republican reports put the figure at 500. Despite the demonization of the insurgents, though, twenty-two "blue coats" from the parish were saved by the request of their own neighborhoods; others were even cleared by tribunals established to monitor executions, and overseen by the local jurist, René François Souchu. Souchu, a lawyer and judge by profession, directed the execution of approximately 50 republican officials and adherents on 3 April; they were shot down and buried in a field outside of the city.

=== Contemporary reports ===
The most influential of the contemporary reports came from Citizen Boullemer, and was published in over 1000 pamphlets later in the year. (Note: Citizen Boullemer, of Machecoul was a former judge and a crony of the local public prosecutor, Souchu, who escaped the butchery by supporting the insurgency. Boullemer's recitation of the horrors of the massacre at Machecoul by the so-called brigands, reached the Legislature in late 1793. Fife, p. 108.) Boullemer claimed to be among the few surviving eyewitnesses: "there arrived from all exits of the city, five to six thousand peasants, women and children, armed [with] guns, scythes, knives, shovels and pikes. They shouted, running the streets: peace! peace!" Boullemer's account continues: they descended on Machecoul, confronted a detachment of the National guard that had come to enforce the levy. One hundred National Guardsmen and police defended the town against them. Louis-Charles-César Maupassant, a farmer, merchant and a deputy to the convention, tried to harangue the attackers into quiescence, but could not be heard above the din. Most of the Republican troops and officials scattered before the threatening crowd. According to Louis Mortimer-Ternaux, another eye-witness, only three officers and five or six gendarmes remained at their posts. At that time, according to him, some national guardsmen who had tried to escape through an alley were ambushed by peasants, pursued, and finally brought down by the crowd at the feet of the deputy, Maupassant. The crowd then pulled him off his horse and killed him with a stroke of a shovel.

Boullemer's wrote his sensational account well after the fact, in the safety of Rennes, where he was taken after being rescued by republican forces. Boullemer admitted that he had spent most of the six weeks of the upheaval at Machecoul in the safety of his granary, hiding from the peasants. His account of the terror, though lost nothing in the fact that he had seen little: the peasants in the town sounded the tocsin, he wrote, and others exploded from the surrounding fields. Within a short time the entire affair had become a wholesale massacre of republican troops, the constitutional priest, known radical sympathizers and anyone involved with the municipal administration. Prisoners had their hands tied behind their backs, and were linked with a rope passed under their armpits, in a so-called rosary; then they were dragged into fields and forced to dig their own graves before being gunned down. Patriots, those who supported the revolution, were hunted down, lashed to trees, and emasculated. Patriot women were raped and cut down in orchards. Boullemer placed the count of the dead at 552.

== View from Paris ==
From the Jacobin clubs, the convention, and the streets and alleyways in Paris, this could only be viewed as insurrection. For them, the Revolution meant a France indivisible. Anything that divided France—anything that varied from the path set the revolutionary government—was dangerous to the success for the revolution itself. Any idea, an action, or thought that ran counter to the revolutionary ideology smacked of federalism or, worse, of royalist sentiment. The historians' debate over federalism and the French Revolution reaches almost to the days of the Revolution itself. To be called a "federalist" in 1793, 1794, or 1795, or any other time in the revolution, for that matter, was tantamount to being labeled as an anti-revolutionary; to be called anti-revolutionary meant one was de facto a royalist. It was a convenient epithet: to be called a federalist alienated one from the principal radical goal of the revolution, which was to create a single, unified French Republic. Any notion of sectionalism—the possibility that a department or departments could establish for themselves a set of conditions and a government—must be labeled as anti-revolutionary. For the moderate Girondins and the radical Montagnards, federalism meant the watering-down of the Revolution, the violation of the civic body, and the loss of their dreams. If the peasants of the Vendée did not want to fight for the Revolution, if they preferred their priests and their (dead) king to their liberty, then they must be against the Revolution and, consequently, they must be severed from its benefits. (Note: For an explanation of federalism and the French Revolution, see Paul R. Hanson, Jacobin Republic Under Fire: The Federalist Revolt in the French Revolution. University Park, Penn State Press, 2003, OCLC 51804615, particularly Chapter Four, "The Federalist Program" (pp. 99–122).)

This uncompromising vision of revolutionary goals implied a plain and brutal truth: "convert heads or chop them off." One deputy complained, "if there were only 30,000, it would be a simple matter of putting them all to the sword, but there are so many!" Boullemer's written description of the event was published as a pamphlet in November 1793, and the representative on mission, Jacques Garnier, sent a thousand copies to the convention, the Executive Council and to all departments; it also served as a basis for the official report that François Toussaint Villers presented to the convention.

== Aftermath ==
There were other levy riots across France, when the departments started to draft men into the army in response to the Levy Decree but reaction in the northwest in March was particularly pronounced with large scale rioting verging on insurrection. By early April, in areas north of the Loire, order had been restored by the revolutionary government, but south of the river, in the four departments that became known as the Vendée Militaire, there were few troops to control rebels and what had started as rioting quickly took on the form of a full insurrection led by priests and the local nobility.

Evidence links these events to local dissatisfaction with the reorganization of the church into a government entity. The unrest began halfway through Lent; Easter that year occurred on 31 March 1793, and, significantly, the initial violence was directed at the local priest Letort. Letort personified the revolution, and the republican government in Paris by taking the Civil Oath of the Clergy, essentially becoming a puppet of the republicans in Paris, at least in the eyes of the insurgents. The violence followed what Raymond Jonas called a singular pattern of logic: it targeted those who personified the revolution in their function or status: National Guard Lieutenant Ferré, such prominent townsmen as Deputy Maupassant, and the constitutional priest Letort. Yet, the local district administrator, the jurist Souchu, was left alone: apparently he was known for his anti-republican sentiments and actually threw his lot in with the insurgents. (Note: Souchu was captured in mid-April by republican troops and immediately executed. Gérard, pp. 134–136. Apparently, as republican troops approached Machecoul, he donned a red liberty cap and rushed out to greet the army, claiming he had been held against his will. Someone denounced him and he was summarily killed. David Bell, The First Total War: Napoleon's Europe and the Birth of Warfare as We Know It, NY, Houghton Mifflin Harcourt, 2014, p. 164.) After the furor in Machecoul died down later in the spring, the former pastor at Machecoul, the non-juring priest François Priou, refused to celebrate at the now "liberated" church because the schismatic constitutional priest had profaned it. Instead, he said the Mass outside on a makeshift altar.

Class differences were not as great in the Vendée as in Paris or in other French provinces. In the rural Vendée, the local nobility seems to have been more permanently in residence and not so resented as in other parts of France. Alexis de Tocqueville noted that most French nobles lived in cities by 1789. An Intendants' survey showed one of the few areas where they still lived with the peasants was the Vendée. Consequently, the conflicts that drove the revolution in Paris, for example, were also lessened in this particularly isolated part of France by the strong adherence of the populace to their Catholic faith.

== Notes, citations and sources ==
=== Sources ===
- Anderson, James Maxwell Anderson. Daily Life During the French Revolution. Greenwood Publishing Group, 2007. ISBN 0-313-33683-0.
- Andress, David. The French Revolution and the People. London, New York, NY, Hambledon and London, 2004, OCLC 59305988
- Bell, David A.The First Total War: Napoleon's Europe and the Birth of Warfare as We Know It. NY, Houghton Mifflin Harcourt, 2006. OCLC 70335302
- British Museum. Catalog of Printed Books: Boi–bon. British Museum, William Clowes & Sons, Limited, 1885 OCLC 855979766
- Fife, Graeme. The Terror: the shadow of the guillotine, France, 1792–1794. New York : St. Martin's Press, 2006. OCLC 70335347
- Furet, François. The French Revolution, 1770–1814, Blackwell Publishing, France, 1996. ISBN 0-631-20299-4.
- (in French) Gérard, Alain. La Vendee: 1789–1793. Seyssel [France], Champ Vallon, 1992, ISBN 978-2-87673-160-8
- Hanson, Paul R. Jacobin Republic Under Fire: The Federalist Revolt in the French Revolution. University Park, Penn State Press, 2003. OCLC 51804615
- Joes, Anthony James. Resisting Rebellion: The History and Politics of Counterinsurgency, Lexington, University Press of Kentucky, 2006. OCLC 69255762
- Jonas, Raymond Anthony. France and the Cult of the Sacred Heart, University of California Press, 2000, OCLC 49570126
- (in French) Lallié, Alfred. Le district de Machecoul, 1788–1793: études sur les origines et les débuts de l'insurrection vendéenne. Forest, 1869. OCLC 674177680
- North, Jonathan. General Hoche and Counterinsurgency The Journal of Military History, 67.2, pp. 529–540. (subscription required)
- Schama, Simon. Citizens: A Chronicle of the French Revolution. NY, Penguin Books, 2004, ISBN 0-14-101727-9
- Stephens, Henry Morse. A History of the French Revolution, Scribner, 1905. OCLC 652178
- Sutherland, Donald M. G. . The French Revolution and Empire: The Quest for a Civic Order. Blackwell Publishing France, 2008. ISBN 0-631-23363-6
- Tilly, Charles, "Local Conflicts in the Vendée before the rebellion of 1793", French Historical Studies II, Fall 1961, p. 219-.
- (in French) Société archéologique et historique de Nantes et de Loire-Atlantique. Bulletin de la Société archéologique et historique de Nantes et de Loire-Atlantique. vol. 130, p. 155, digitized 2006. Accessed 29 April 2015. OCLC 21209067
