= Chardonnay family =

French noble family

- Country: Brittany (Machecoul) and Yvelines (Montfort-l'Amaury)
- Historic seat: 13th century – present day
- Titles: Honorary Squire to the Dauphin; Winetaster to the Dauphin; Page to the King of France; Lord Marshal to the Ducal Court of Burgundy
- Connected members: de Chardonnay de Bicherel de la Marne de La Mallonière de Bardelle de Tremblay de Montfort
- Motto: De gueules à un lion d'argent langué d'or (aliàs de sable). (Gules, a lion argent langued Or (alias sable).)
- Estate: Kingdom of France

The Chardonnay family, also Chardonnet and Chardonnay de Bicherel or Chardonnay de La Marne, is a lineage of the French nobility of ancient extraction, with documented origins in Montfort-l'Amaury in Yvelines and Machecoul, in Brittany. According to family tradition, the Chardonnays claimed descent from the Counts of Montfort-l’Amaury. The family’s nobility was confirmed by the royal council in 1668 and by the Chambre de la réformation de la noblesse de Bretagne in 1669. The family's principal estates included Bardelle, Tremblay, Bicherel, Le Vivier (Vicq), Vigny-en-Drouais, Fresnay-en-Retz, Machecoul, La Marne, and La Tamiserie. Elevated to a marquisate in the eighteenth century, its members figured as courtiers, military officers, émigrés during the Revolution, and later in nineteenth-century diplomacy. Members of the family held positions at the French royal court over a period of four centuries.

== History ==
=== Origins (13th–14th centuries) ===
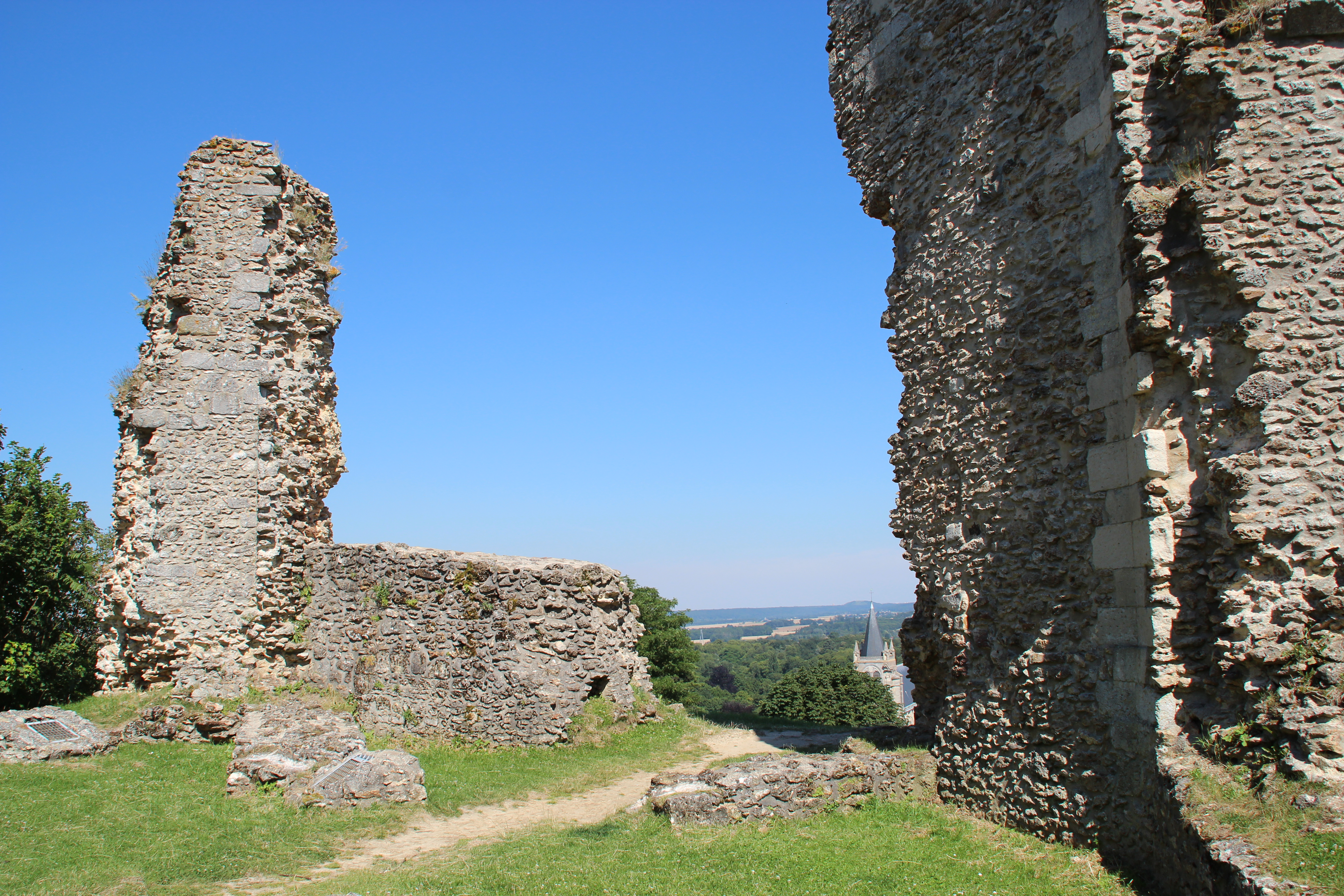
Château de Montfort-l'Amaury

The earliest known members of the family appear in records from the late 13th century:

- Thomas du Chardonnet, écuyer, held land at Lieutel in Yvelines in 1279.
- Guillaume and Jean de Chardonnay are documented as landholders in 1317–1318.
- In 1378, Philippe and Robinet de Chardonnay are cited together in Montfort-l'Amaury.
- Robinet de Chardonnay, seigneur de Bardelle, appears in an act of acquisition dated 1381.

=== Establishment under the Valois (15th century) ===
By the early 15th century, Jean de Chardonnay le Chardin, l’Aîné was écuyer d’honneur to Louis, Duke of Orléans. He held Bardelle and Tremblay and obtained letters patent from the Duke in 1403. His descendants maintained these lands, devoting their service to the Abbaye de Neauphle-le-Vieux and to the Counts of Montfort.

=== Renaissance Period (16th century) ===
The family consolidated its seigneurial presence during the 16th century:

- Bernard de Chardonnay, écuyer, seigneur de Bardelle and Chardonnais, is frequently cited between 1533 and 1552.
- His brother Philippe de Chardonnay, seigneur de Bicherel, was appointed échanson (cupbearer) of the Dauphin in 1546.
- Their status is attested by the inscription on a church bell in Vicq (1550), naming Bernard and Philippe as patrons.

Marriages linked the family to other local noble houses, including Chartres, Jouan, and La Rochette.

=== Seventeenth Century ===
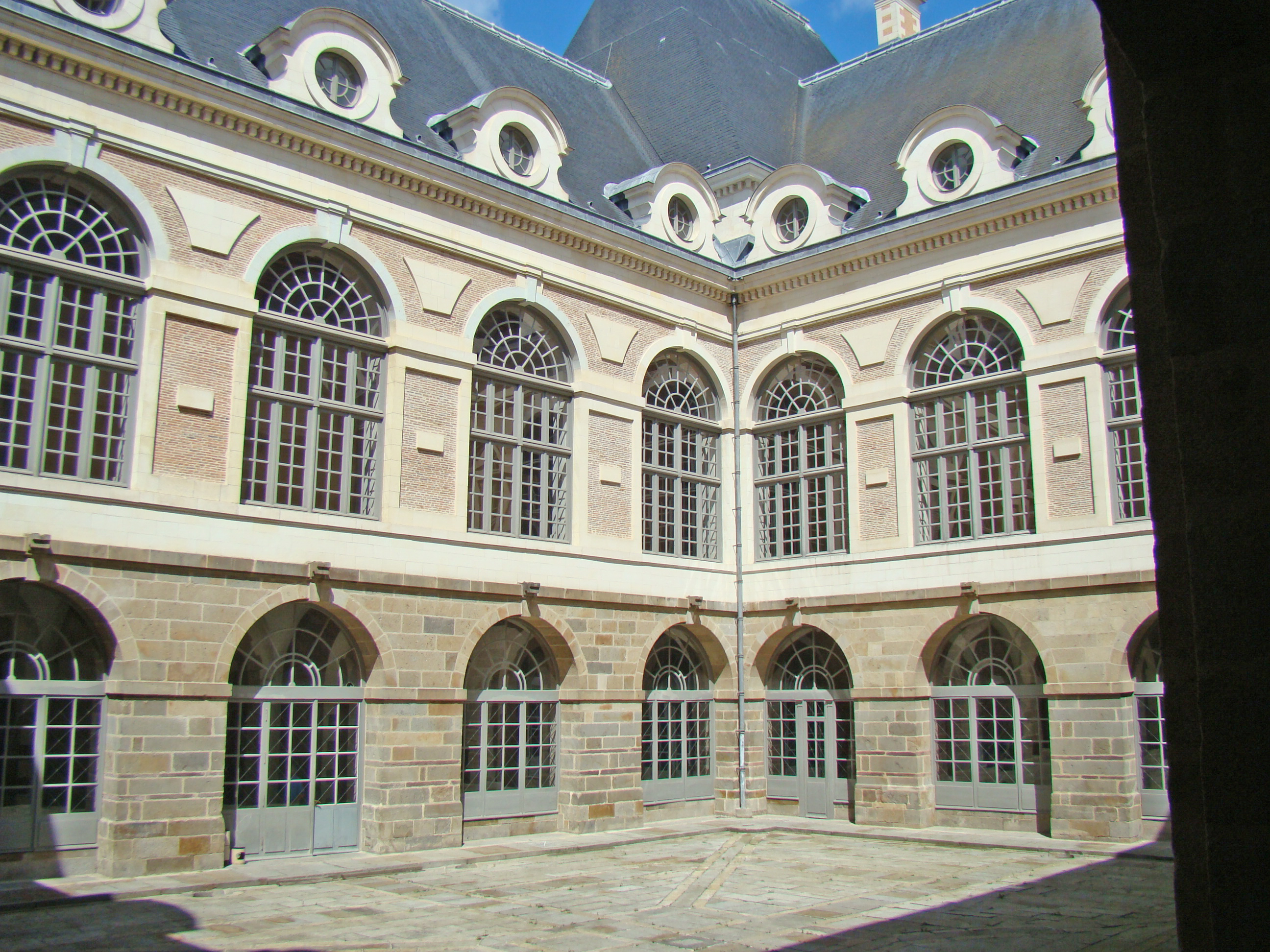
Parliament of Rennes, former Chamber for the Reformation of Brittany

In the early 1600s, Jérôme (Hiérosme) de Chardonnay, lieutenant of gendarmes, became seigneur de Bicherel through his marriage with Gillette de Pomereu. His son, Jérôme II (Guillaume) de Chardonnay, sergeant major in the army, received his confirmation of nobility in 1669 at Rennes.

In parallel, François I de Chardonnay (1633–1704), seigneur de Bardelle, Vigny, and Neuville, served as captain of grenadiers and captain in the Guards of the Duke of Orléans. In 1668, François and his cousin Louis made proofs of nobility as required at the time, and were confirmed as nobles and écuyers by the King and his Council.

=== Eighteenth Century ===
Several members distinguished themselves militarily and at court:

- Claude de Chardonnay (1671–1722), seigneur de La Marne, registered his arms in 1697.

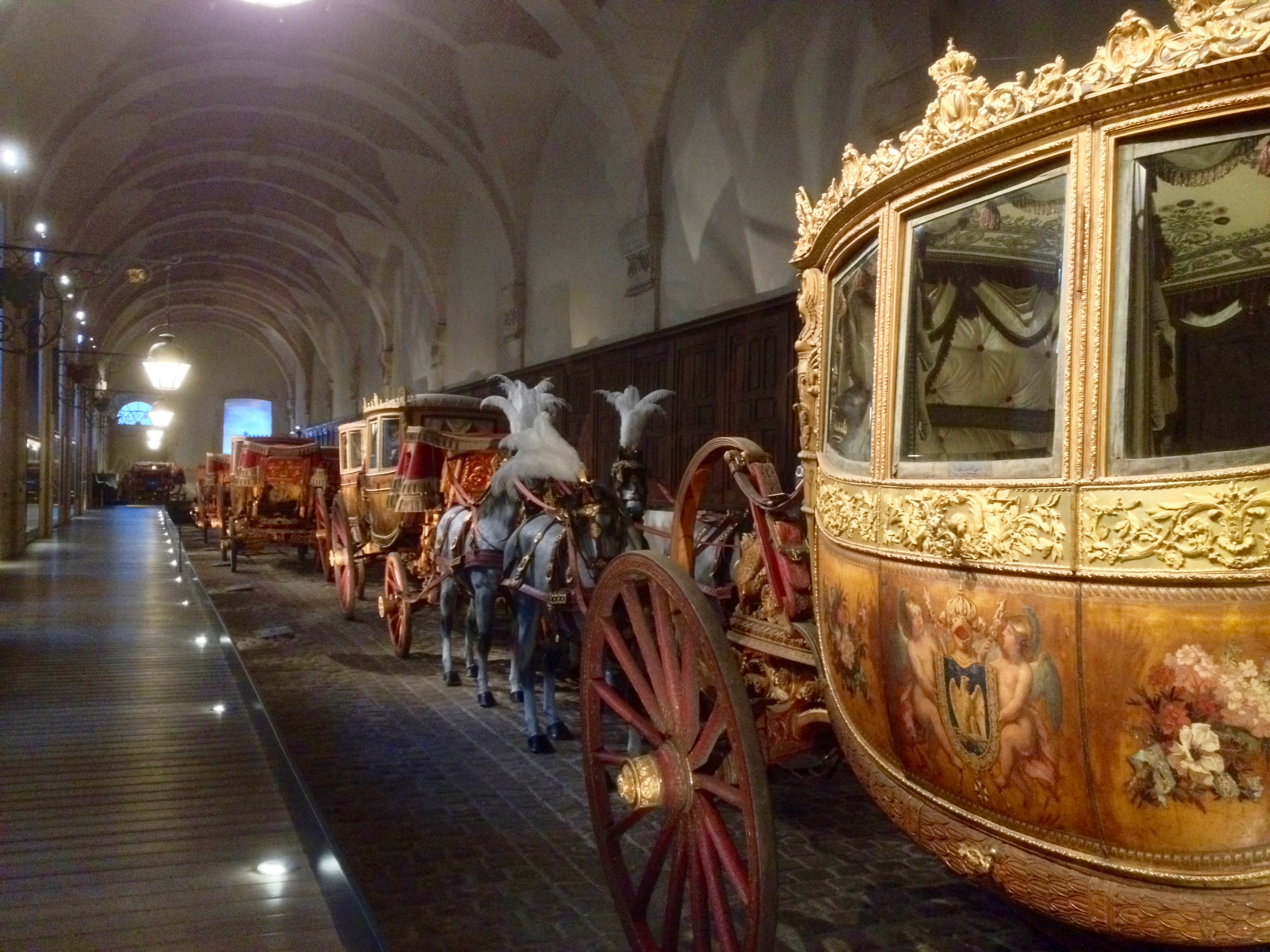
Galerie des Carrosses, Versailles, formerly the Grande Écurie du Roi

- His son René de Chardonnay de Bicherel (1718–1765) was a page of the Grande Écurie du Roi.
- René-Marie de Chardonnay de Bicherel, 1st Marquis de Chardonnay (1746–1800), was officer in the Royal Dragons, and émigré during the French Revolution, settling in Jersey.

The Île-de-France branch extinguished in the 18th century after Charles-Pierre de Chardonnay (1752–1782) sold Bardelle and related estates.

=== French Revolution ===
The family suffered significant losses during the Revolution. Their estates, including La Marne, La Tamiserie, and Paulx, were seized. Marie-Marthe de Chardonnay (1724–1803), widow of Honoré Pitard du Landas, attempted to preserve remnants of the patrimony. Her son, Honoré (II) perished in the Vendée uprising of 1793.

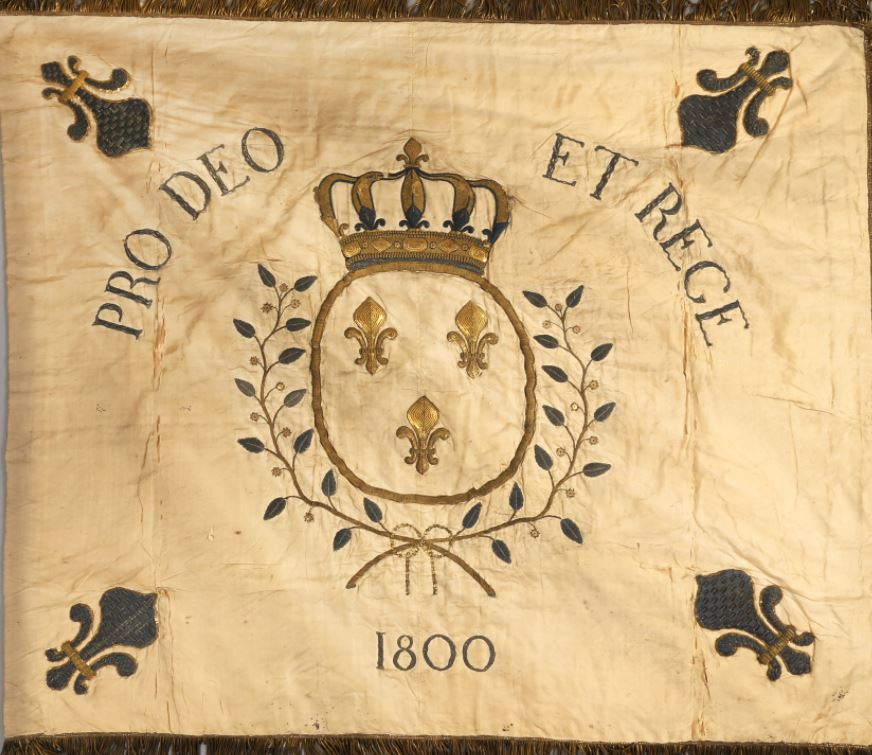
Flag of the Catholic and Royal Army during the War in the Vendée

Other members emigrated: some to England and also to Saint-Domingue, reflecting the fate of many noble families of the period.

== Marquesses de Chardonnay ==
The marquisate of Chardonnay was borne by the senior line of the house of Chardonnay de La Marne following the proofs of nobility of René-Marie de Chardonnay de La Marne in 1762. The title continued to be used during the Revolution and into the nineteenth century, featuring in French diplomatic correspondence throughout the First Empire and the Restoration period, as well as contemporary British and Portuguese society circles.

- René-Marie de Chardonnay de La Marne, 1st Marquis de Chardonnay (1746 – 23 September 1800). Seigneur of La Marne, Corsept, and La Malonnière; officer in the Royal Dragons; émigré to Jersey. Married (1768) Olive-Clémence Élisabeth de Bellabre (1748–1816), dame de Corsept.

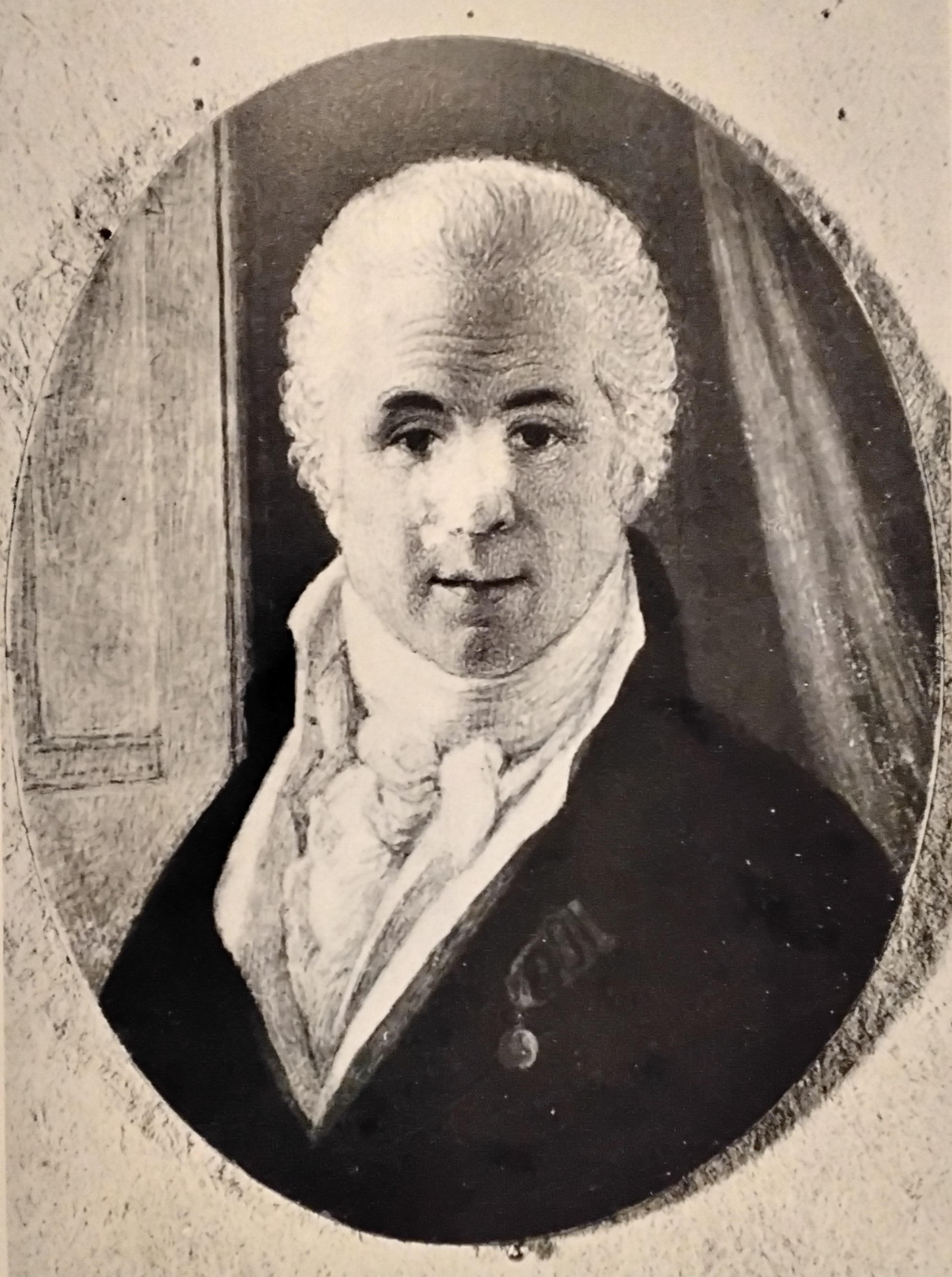
The 2nd Marquis de Chardonnay, miniature, private collection of Luís de Paiva Raposo Ferros (3rd Count of Felgueiras)

- Marie-Jean Baptiste Benoît de Chardonnay alias de Montfort, 2nd Marquis de Chardonnay (27 July 1784 – 18 April 1839). Married (1814, London) D. Joana de Lima Barreto Coelho, daughter of José de Oliveira Barreto ComC and D. Maria de Lima Barreto Coelho, heiress to estates in Mide (Lordelo, Guimarães) and Lamego. Early in life, he served as an officer during the Peninsular War, and later maintained extensive correspondence with leading figures of his time. He was buried at St Mary Moorfields in London. After his death, the family retired to the Portuguese properties. His will, preserved in the Public Record Office, left his estate—composed largely of bonds issued by N. M. Rothschild—to his surviving children:
  - Joseph-Denis de Chardonnay (baptised London, 1815), predeceased his father and is not mentioned in the will.
  - Jeanne-Marie de Chardonnay
  - Angélic-Mary-Charlotte-Élisabette-Olive de Chardonnay – not mentioned in her father’s will; heiress of one third of her mother’s estate, per her testament preserved in the Torre do Tombo. Married Manuel Gomes da Fonseca Sobrinho; issue included D. Maria Angélica de Chardonnay Gomes da Fonseca, who married José Godinho de Sousa Matos, with issue.
  - Constant-Flore-Marie-Robert de Chardonnay, 3rd Marquis de Chardonnay (b. London, 1819).
  - Marie-Célestine de Chardonnay
  - Marie-Louise-Émilie de Chardonnay

In 1845, the 3rd Marquis de Chardonnay duelled António Augusto de Passos Pimentel after disagreements at a party. Both duellists fired and missed, having agreed to settle the dispute on the first round no matter the outcome, leaving as friends, in what a newspaper criticized as a "farse of heroism". According to the same report, shortly afterwards Colonel Passos Pimentel — who had acted as second to his nephew and was governor of the Castelo da Foz — lunched with the Chardonnay family at the invitation of the Dowager Marchioness, thereby bringing the quarrel to a formal close.

=== Genealogy ===
Chardonnay family

Thomas de Chardonnay écuyer, Lieutel, c. 1279
Guillaume de Chardonnet écuyer, Lieutel, c. 1317
Jean de Chardonnet écuyer, Lieutel, took possession in 1318
Philippe de Chardonnay écuyer, Montfort, c. 1378	Robinet de Chardonnet “Noble homme”, Épernon, c. 1381
Jean de Chardonnay, le Chardin, l'Ainé; Noble Homme, Gentilhomme; 1st seigneur de Bardelle; 1st seigner de Tremblay; Écuyer honoraire of Louis, Duke of Orléans (later Louis XI, King of France); Montfort, c. 1403. m. Jeanne de Flacourt	Étienne de Chardonnay; Écuyer
Jean de Chardonnay; 2nd seigneur de Bardelle; 2nd seigneur de Tremblay	Michel de Chardonnay; Damoiseau
Guillaume de Chardonnet; 3rd seigneur de Bardelle; 3rd seigneur de Tremblay
Jean de Chardonnet; 4th seigneur de Bardelle; 4th seigneur de Tremblay m. Arthuse de Maubuisson
Bernard de Chardonnay; 5th seigneur de Bardelle; 5th seigneur de Tremblay m. 1545 Catherine de Chartres	Philippe de Chardonnay; 1st seigneur de Bicherel; Échanson (cupbearer) to the Dauphin of France (later Henry II, King of France) m. 2 Set. 1546/ 1548? Jehanne de Joaun
Charles de Chardonnay, Écuyer; 6th seigneur de Tremblay; 6th seigneur de Bardelle m. 1578 Germaine de Rochette	Hiérosme de Chardonnay; 2nd seigneur de Bicherel m. 9 June 1603 Gillette de Pomereu
Jacques de Chardonnay, Écuyer; 7th seigneur de Bardelle and of La Place and of the fief de Neauphle m. 1606 Marguerite de Morteaux, dame de Vigny and Marville	Hiérosme de Chardonnay; 3rd seigneur de Bicherel; Sergeant Major in the Regiment of the Viscount of Langeron; m. 3 Nov 1635 (Fresnay, diocese of Nantes) with Marguerite de Bastelard, who after widowing, retreated with the family to Machecoul, in Brittany
François de Chardonnay, Chr. 8th seigneur de Tremblay and Bardelle; Montfort-l'Amaury, c. 1698; Lord Marshal of the Ducal Court of Burgundy	Louis de Chardonnay; 4th seigneur de Bicherel et du fief du Vivier m. 1666 (Machecoul) Jeanne-Marie de Flustres (alias de Feustres)
François (II) de Chardonnay, Chr. maître d’hôtel to the Duchess of Burgundy m. 1700 (Montfort) Marie-Jeanne Benoist	Claude de Chardonnay; 5th seigneur de Bicherel m. 1705 Michelle-Bernard du Préaux
Charles-François de Chardonnay, Chr. 10th seigneur de Bardelle and La Queue; Knight of Saint-Louis m. Madeleine-Charlotte de Soulaigre (granddaughter of Louis XIV)	René de Chardonnay de Bicherel, Chr. 1st seigneur de La Marne; 1st seigneur de La Mallonière; 6th seigneur de Bicherel m. 1742 Marie Bonnetier
Charles-Pierre de Chardonnay, Chr. 11th seigneur de Tremblay and Bardelle (1752-1782)	René-Marie de Chardonnay de La Marne, Chr. (b. Nantes, 1746) Proofs of nobility, 1762; 1st Marquis de Chardonnay; 2nd seigneur de La Marne; 2nd seigneur de La Mallonière; 7th seigneur de Bicherel m. 1768 Elizabeth Bellabre	Alexandre de Chardonnay, Chr. (n. 1756); Proofs of nobility, 1775; Page to the King; Louis XVI
Marie-Jean-Baptiste-Benoît de Montfort, Chr. 2nd Marquis de Chardonnay; 3rd seigneur de La Marne; 3rd seigneur de La Mallonière; 7th seigneur de Bicherel (b. Nantes, 1784 – d. London, Nutford Place, 1839) m. London, 1814 D. Joanna de Lima Barreto Coelho (b. Porto – d. Lisbon, freg. da Madalena, 27 January 1861)	Robert-Joseph de Chardonnay, Chr. (b. Nantes, 1789)
Joseph-Denis de Chardonnay; Baptized, London, 6 October 1815	Angélic-Mary-Charlotte-Elisabette-Olive de Chardonnay (b. 1816) m. Manuel Gomes da Fonseca Sobrinho	Constant-Flore-Marie-Robert (b. 1819); 3rd Marquis de Chardonnay
D. Maria Angélica de Chardonnay Gomes da Fonseca m. José Godinho de Sousa Matos

== See also ==
- Château de Montfort-l’Amaury
- Duchy of Brittany
- French emigration (1789–1815)
- St Mary Moorfields
- Hilaire de Chardonnet
- Instituto dos Arquivos Nacionais / Torre do Tombo
- Guimarães
- Lamego

== Bibliography ==
- Brame, Henri. “Historique de l’Abbaye de Saint-Pierre de Neauphle-le-Vieux.” Revue Mabillon, 2e série, n°46 (1936).
- Chaix d’Est-Ange, Gustave. Dictionnaire des familles françaises anciennes ou notables à la fin du XIXe siècle. Paris: Imprimerie Charles Hérissey, 1911.
- Jougla de Morenas, Henri; de Warren, Raoul. Grand Armorial de France. Tome II. Paris: 1948.
- Le Chevalier de Beauregard. Nobiliaire de Bretagne. Paris: I. Bouchard-Huzard, 1840.
- Pattou, Étienne. Maison de Chardonnay, dite de Bicherel (alias Chardonnais, Chardonnet, Chardonné). Racines et Histoire. Updated 8 April 2024.
- Pins, Jean de. Sentiment et diplomatie au début du XIXe siècle. Paris: Fondation Calouste Gulbenkian, 1984.
- The Gentleman’s Magazine, Vol. 11 (new series), Jan–Jun 1839.
- Biblioteca Nacional de Portugal, Col. Jorge de Moser: Apontamentos Genealógicos et Heráldicos, tomes V & III.
- Instituto dos Arquivos Nacionais / Torre do Tombo (Lisbon), A.H. Ministério das Finanças, Testamentos, Livro 27.
- Archives Nationales (Paris), Fonds divers, XIVe–XVIIIe siècles.
