= Villeneuve-en-Retz =

Villeneuve-en-Retz Kerveneg-Raez (Breton)
- Commune
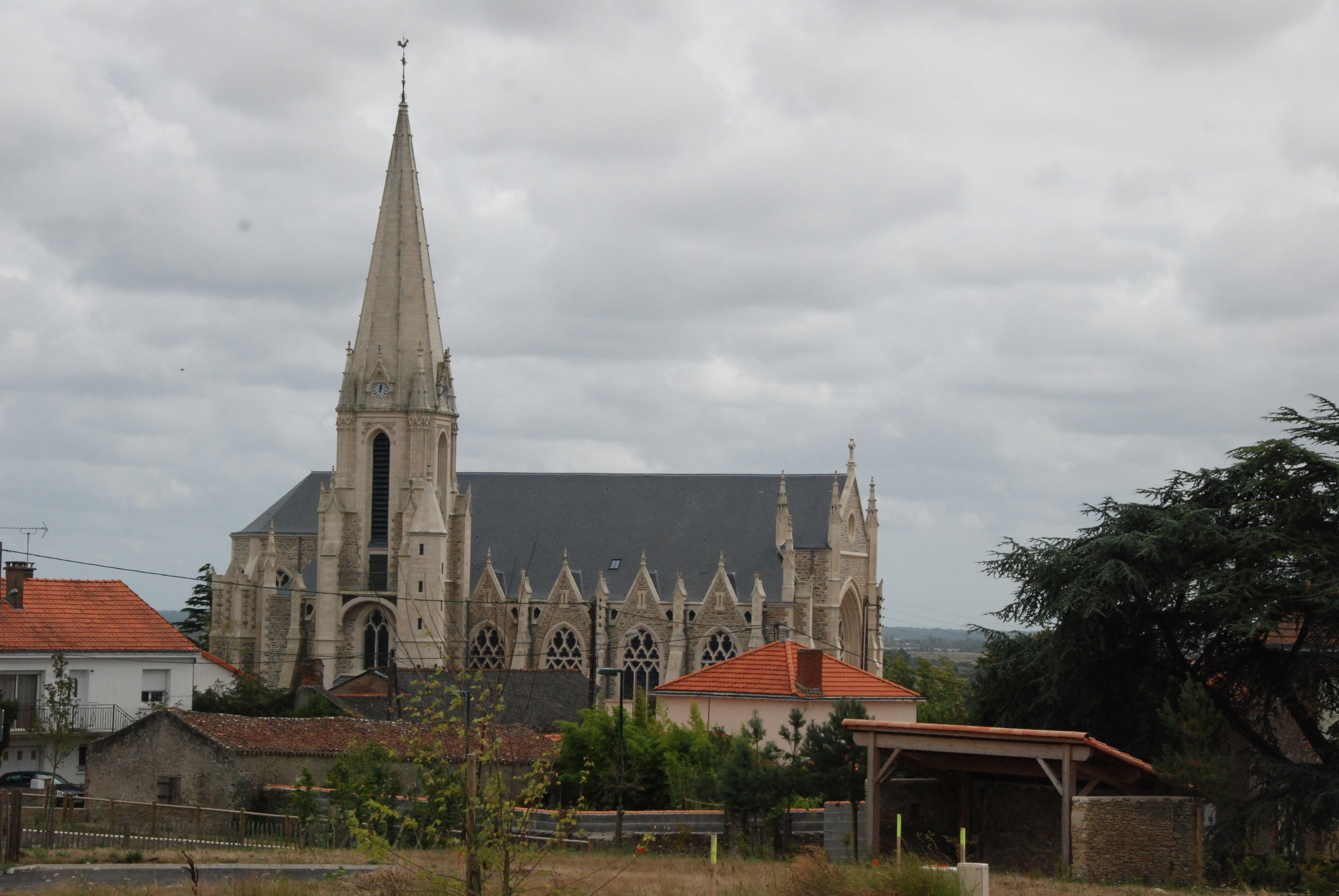
- The church of Saint-Cyr-en-Retz
- Location of Villeneuve-en-Retz
- Location within France Location within Pays de la Loire
- Coordinates: 47°02′35″N 1°57′07″W
- Country: France
- Region: Pays de la Loire
- Department: Loire-Atlantique
- Arrondissement: Saint-Nazaire
- Canton: Machecoul-Saint-Même
- Intercommunality: CA Pornic Agglo Pays de Retz

Government
  - Mayor (2020–2026): Jean-Bernard Ferrer
- Area^{1}: 73.68 km^{2} (28.45 sq mi)
- Population (2023): 5,120
  - Density: 69.5/km^{2} (180/sq mi)
- Time zone: UTC+01:00 (CET)
  - Summer (DST): UTC+02:00 (CEST)
- INSEE/Postal code: 44021 /44580
- ^{1} French Land Register data, which excludes lakes, ponds, glaciers > 1 km^{2} (0.386 sq mi or 247 acres) and river estuaries.

Villeneuve-en-Retz (French pronunciation: [vilnœv ɑ̃ ʁɛ]; Breton: Kernevez-Raez) is a commune in the department of Loire-Atlantique, western France. The municipality was established on 1 January 2016 through the merger of the former communes of Bourgneuf-en-Retz and Fresnay-en-Retz.

== Population ==
Population data refer to the commune in its geography as of January 2025.

Historical population
Year	Pop.	±% p.a.
1968	2,941	—
1975	2,920	−0.10%
1982	3,160	+1.13%
1990	3,194	+0.13%
1999	3,258	+0.22%
2007	4,280	+3.47%
2012	4,753	+2.12%
2017	4,929	+0.73%
2023	5,120	+0.64%
Source: INSEE

== See also ==
- Communes of the Loire-Atlantique department
