= Machecoul-Saint-Même =

Machecoul-Saint-Même Machikoul-Sant-Masen (Breton)
- Commune
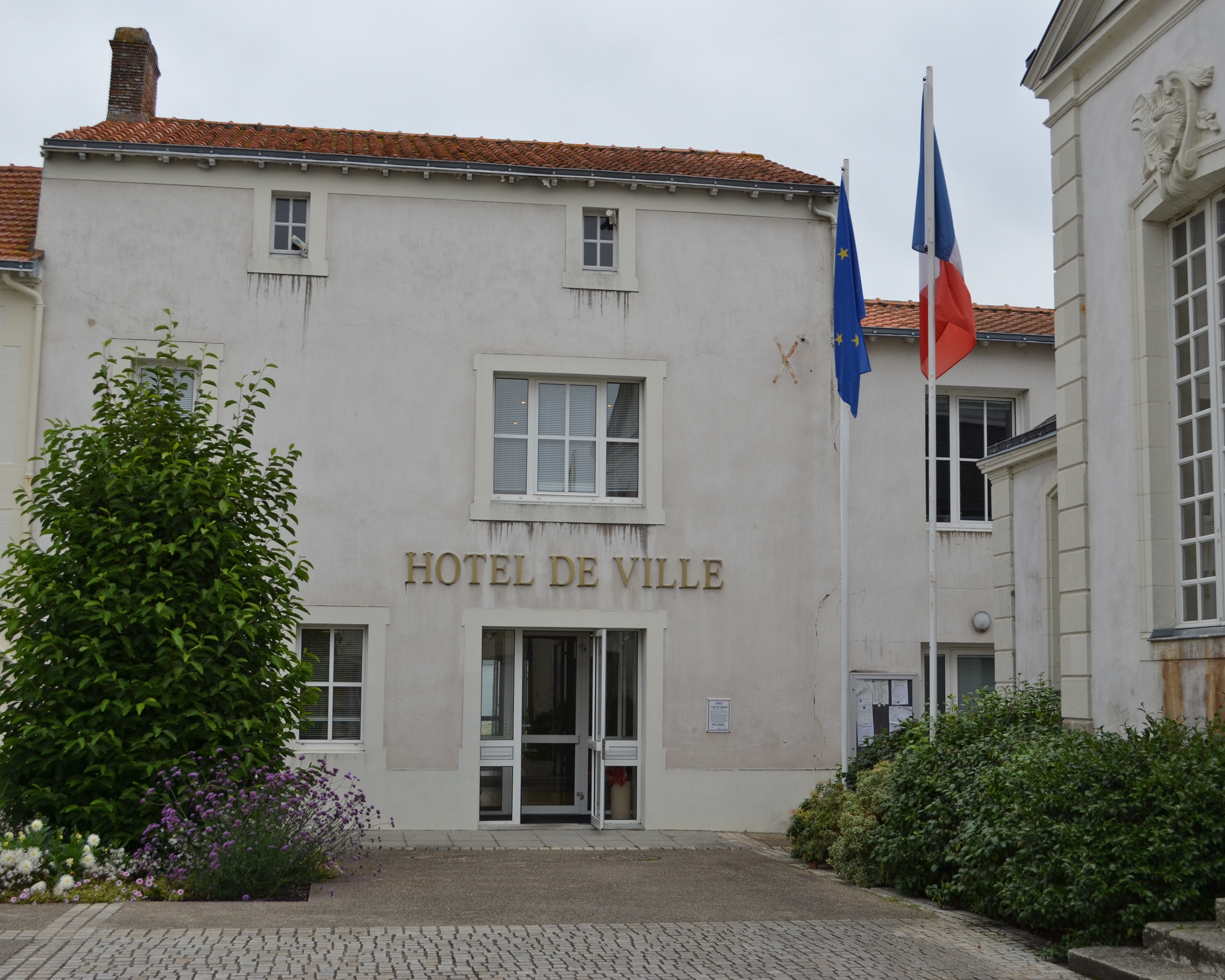
- Town hall
- Location of Machecoul-Saint-Même
- Location within France Location within Pays de la Loire
- Coordinates: 46°59′35″N 1°49′05″W
- Country: France
- Region: Pays de la Loire
- Department: Loire-Atlantique
- Arrondissement: Nantes
- Canton: Machecoul-Saint-Même
- Intercommunality: Sud Retz Atlantique

Government
  - Mayor (2020–2026): Laurent Robin
- Area^{1}: 84.89 km^{2} (32.78 sq mi)
- Highest elevation: 39 m (128 ft)
- Lowest elevation: 0 m (0 ft)
- Population (2023): 7,689
  - Density: 90.58/km^{2} (234.6/sq mi)
- Time zone: UTC+01:00 (CET)
  - Summer (DST): UTC+02:00 (CEST)
- INSEE/Postal code: 44087 /44270
- ^{1} French Land Register data, which excludes lakes, ponds, glaciers > 1 km^{2} (0.386 sq mi or 247 acres) and river estuaries.

Machecoul-Saint-Même (French pronunciation: [maʃku(l) sɛ̃ mɛm]; Breton: Machikoul-Sant-Masen) is a commune in the department of Loire-Atlantique, western France. The municipality was established on 1 January 2016 by merger of the former communes of Machecoul and Saint-Même-le-Tenu. Machecoul station has rail connections to Saint-Gilles-Croix-de-Vie and Nantes.

== Population ==
Population data refer to the commune in its geography as of January 2025.

Historical population
Year	Pop.	±% p.a.
1968	4,937	—
1975	5,180	+0.69%
1982	5,841	+1.73%
1990	5,942	+0.21%
1999	6,352	+0.74%
2007	6,897	+1.03%
2012	7,182	+0.81%
2017	7,473	+0.80%
2023	7,689	+0.48%
Source: INSEE

== See also ==
- Communes of the Loire-Atlantique department
