= Marc Daviaud =

French footballer (born 1958)

Personal information
- Full name: Marc Daviaud
- Date of birth: December 27, 1958 (age 67)
- Place of birth: Machecoul, France
- Height: 1.85 m (6 ft 1 in)
- Position: Goalkeeper

Senior career*
Years	Team	Apps	(Gls)
1974–1976	Nantes	0	(0)
1977–1979	Cholet	?	(?)
1979–1984	La Rochelle	?	(?)
1984–1986	Chamois Niortais	33	(0)
1986–1987	Bourges	?	(?)
- * Club domestic league appearances and goals

Marc Daviaud (born December 27, 1958) is a retired French professional footballer. He played as a goalkeeper.

== See also ==
- Football in France
- List of football clubs in France
