= Louis-Charles-César Maupassant =

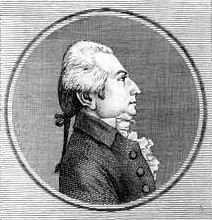
Louis Charles César Maupassant

Louis-Charles-César Maupassant, born 25 April 1750 in Saumur, died 11 March 1793 in Machecoul, was a merchant, farmer and deputy to the French National Convention.

From a bourgeois family in Nort, he was a small landholder, and churchwarden of the parish at the beginning of the French Revolution. Subsequently, he was elected 15 April 1789, as an alternate member of the Seneschal of Nantes to the Estates General and in March 1790, elected to the governing board of the Lower Loire department. He then sat on the Constituent Assembly on 5 September, replacing the lawyer Pellerin, who had resigned. Sitting among the majority, he opposed the release of Necker on 11 September and against the motion against the refractory priests on 17 July 1791, the day of the shooting of Champ de Mars. On 3 September the Assembly completed the drafting of the constitution, and a deputation of 60 members is appointed by the President to present the text to the king, the same evening. Maupassant was included in this group as "one who would hold the king to his word".

On 10 September 1791 he was elected as the second alternate member for Lower Loire to the Legislative Assembly and member of the Executive Department. In March 1793, he was sent to Machecoul, by the Department of Management, to organise the mass uprising but was killed by a panic in the first attack of the village by the rebel peasants.

== Sources ==
- Adolphe Robert, Gaston Cougny (ed.), Dictionary of French parliamentarians from 1789 to 1889, Paris, Bourloton, 1889, Volume 4 ( Mathieu to Maureins ), p. 319
- Armand Guérand, western provinces Review, Nantes, Guérand & Cie, 1858, p. 637
