= Our Lady of Victories, Kensington =

Roman Catholic church in London

Coordinates: 51.4990°N 0.1972°W

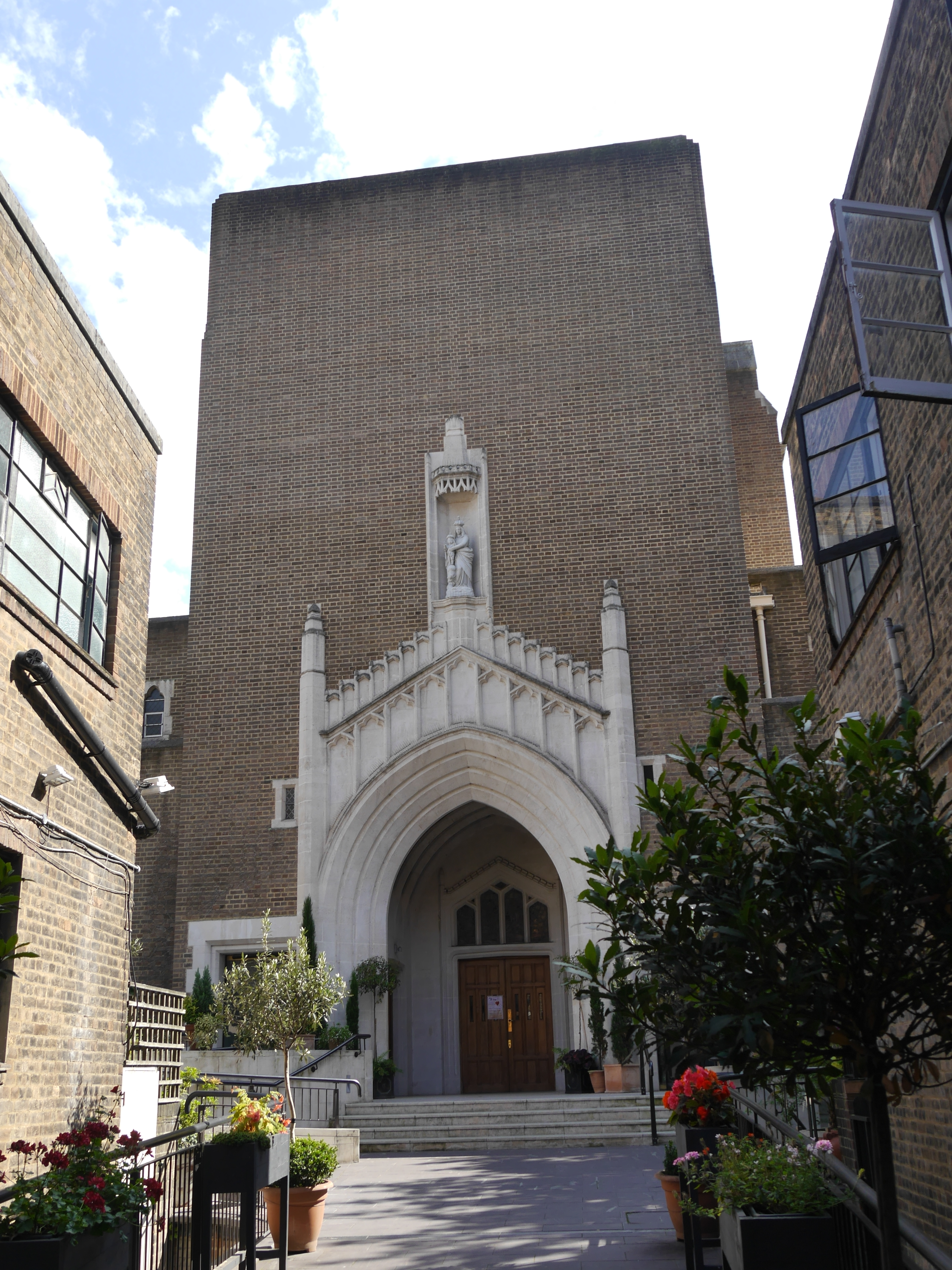
Our Lady of Victories, Kensington, 2016

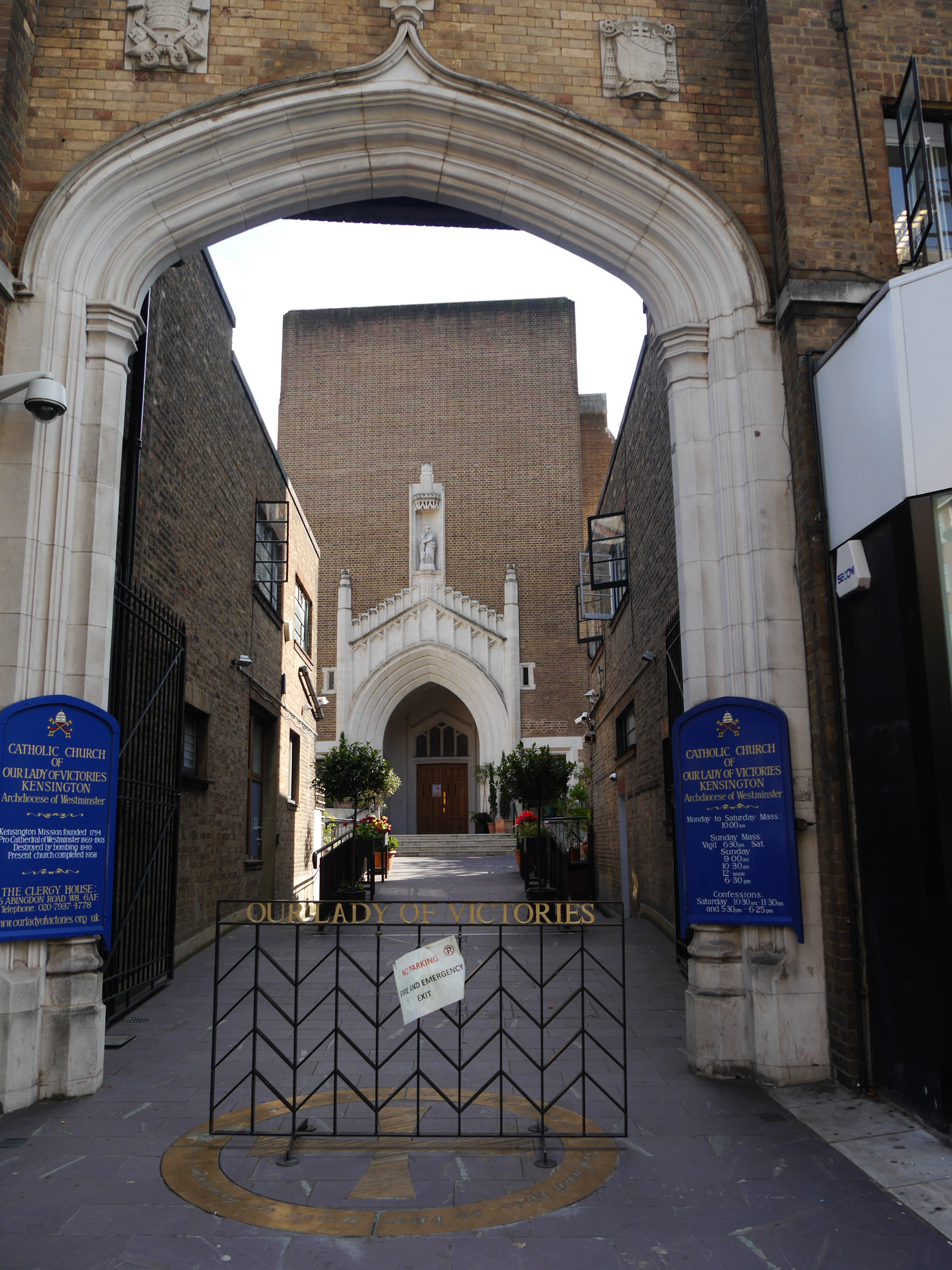
Our Lady of Victories, Kensington, 2016

Our Lady of Victories, in Kensington, London, is a Roman Catholic church. The original church opened in 1869, and for 34 years to 1903 served as pro-cathedral of the Archdiocese of Westminster. That building was destroyed by bombing in 1940: its successor, which survives, opened in 1959. The church stands at 235a Kensington High Street, Kensington, in the Royal Borough of Kensington and Chelsea.

== History ==
=== Re-establishment of public Catholic worship in England ===
English resumption of regular, public Catholic services commenced in 1794 after a break of nearly 250 years with the Roman Catholic Relief Act 1791 (with main exceptions being for the entourages of courtiers of the consorts of Charles I and Charles II, chapels with use ceded for foreign ambassadorial missions and two chapels under deposed King James II), as French aristocrats, priests and nuns fled the French Revolution and found a welcome in Kensington, since when the parish has had continuous worship and services.

Mass in the subjugated period of English Catholicism was said in Catholic embassies or private houses. From 1852 to 1869 St Mary's Church, Moorfields, built by the faith served as the first diocesan seat of a re-established British Catholic church with hierarchy. In 1866 the Carmelites opened the first Catholic church in Kensington.

=== Nineteenth-century building ===
The original parish church of Our Lady of Victories was designed by noted architect George Goldie. His grandson Joseph Goldie would later design the entrance screen. The church opened on 2 July 1869, the Feast of the Visitation, taking over the congregation of St. Mary's Roman Catholic Chapel, Holland Street. The foundation stone was laid by Princess Marguerite of Orleans and Henry Stafford-Jerningham, 9th Baron Stafford. It became the pro-cathedral of the Archdiocese of Westminster as Cardinal Manning wished for a site more central than St. Mary Moorfields. Our Lady of Victories served as the pro-cathedral until Westminster Cathedral opened in 1903.

=== Notable events ===
At Queen Victoria's golden jubilee in 1887, High Mass was celebrated in the presence of Cardinal Manning, sung by the Papal Envoy and attended by all the hierarchy and leading Catholics in England. The following year, the jubilee of 50 years of priesthood of Pope Leo XIII was the occasion of another glittering assembly in the church, during which "God Bless Our Pope", composed by the curate of Our Lady of Victories, Fr Charles Cox, was sung for the first time in public.

Our Lady of Victories School started in the late 1800s when the parish priest of Our Lady of Victories set up a "Poor School" in a hall in the grounds of the Assumption Convent in Kensington Square. Cardinal Vaughan Memorial School is a secondary school located in the parish.

=== Destruction and rebuilding ===
On the night of 13 September 1940, four German incendiary bombs landed on the roof of the church. In 2½ hours the church was devastated and burned to the ground. The Blessed Sacrament was saved and taken by the priests to the nearby Carmelite Church.

Re-building was not permitted until after the end of the war, so the parish was without a church for a length of time. Daily Mass and all services were maintained without a break, first in the local Odeon cinema, and then in the premises of Cavendish Furnishings – known as "St Cavendish's" by parishioners – in the Convent of the Assumption in Kensington Square (where still many parish outreach and activities take place today), in the hall at the back of the burnt out church and finally in the local Congregational Church, Allen Street, leased to the parish with great goodwill.

A succession of parish priests – Canon Bagshawe, Mgr Kelleher and Fr Drumm – worked to raise funds for a new church. In 1952 the architect Adrian Gilbert Scott was commissioned by Canon Bagshawe to design a new church. On 16 April 1959 the rebuilt church of Our Lady of Victories, was opened as the parish church of Kensington by Cardinal Archbishop William Godfrey. The consecration of the church and altar was performed by Bishop Derek Worlock, formerly curate in Kensington and later Archbishop of Liverpool, on the 26 May 1971 in the presence of Cardinal Heenan.

== Building ==
The present re-built church was built in 1957, to designs by Adrian Gilbert Scott, incorporating a 1930s entrance screen by Joseph Goldie. It has been a Grade II listed building since 2016.

A War Damage Commission grant enabled the creation of a set of stained-glass windows by C. F. Blakeman. In the 1980s Fr Walter Drumm moved the large Bavarian crucifix above the sanctuary to the western aisle, where it serves as the twelfth Station of the Cross, and installed above the sanctuary a bronzed sculpture of the Risen Christ by Michael Clark, whose father, Lindsay, had sculpted the statue of Our Lady, help of Christians above the entrance arch on the High Street. Today the sculpture by Clark has been relocated and the empty space is waiting to be filled by a new piece.

New facilities, such as in the basement and adornments are ongoing. In the 2010s projects (overseen by the incumbent Mgr Jim Curry and the building committee) included upgrade of disabled access and renovation of the large community facilities beneath the church.
