= St Mary Moorfields =

Church in the City of London, England

- Church of Saint Mary Moorfields
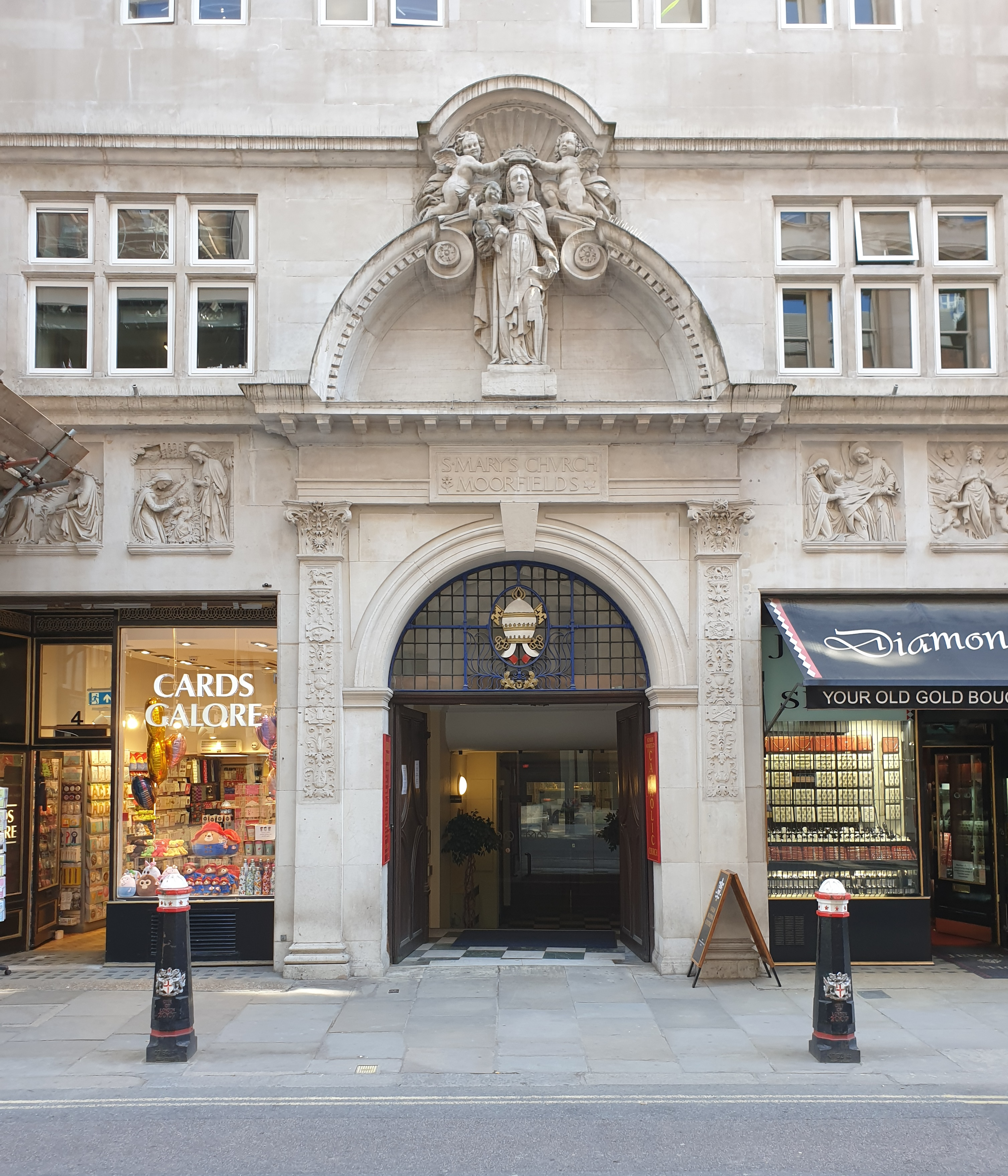
- Street entrance

- 51°31′7.64″N 0°5′8.57″W
- Location: 4–5 Eldon Street, City of London, EC2
- Country: England
- Language: English
- Denomination: Roman Catholic
- Website: parish.rcdow.org.uk/moorfields

History
- Founded: 1820 (original site)
- Founder: Rev. Joseph Hunt
- Dedication: Mary, mother of Jesus
- Dedicated: 25 March 1903

Architecture
- Architect: George Campbell Sherrin
- Style: Edwardian, Neoclassical, Italianate
- Years built: 1899–1903

Administration
- Archdiocese: Westminster
- Parish: Moorfields

Clergy
- Priest: Fr Jan Nowotnik

St Mary Moorfields is a Roman Catholic church in Eldon Street near Moorgate, on a site previously known as Moorfields. It is the only Catholic church in the City of London. Prior to a 1994 boundary change, the church was in the Borough of Hackney, such that there were no Catholic churches in the City.

The present building, located at 4–5 Eldon Street, was opened in 1903, after the previous building had been demolished in 1899. However, the foundation had a long history prior to this. A chapel was opened in 1686, but was suspended in 1689, in the aftermath of the Revolution of 1688.

The church serves as a hub for evangelism, especially directed at young people who work in the surrounding financial district. The church hosts monthly Opus Dei meetings, and is also affiliated with the St Francis of Assisi Ramblers.

== History ==
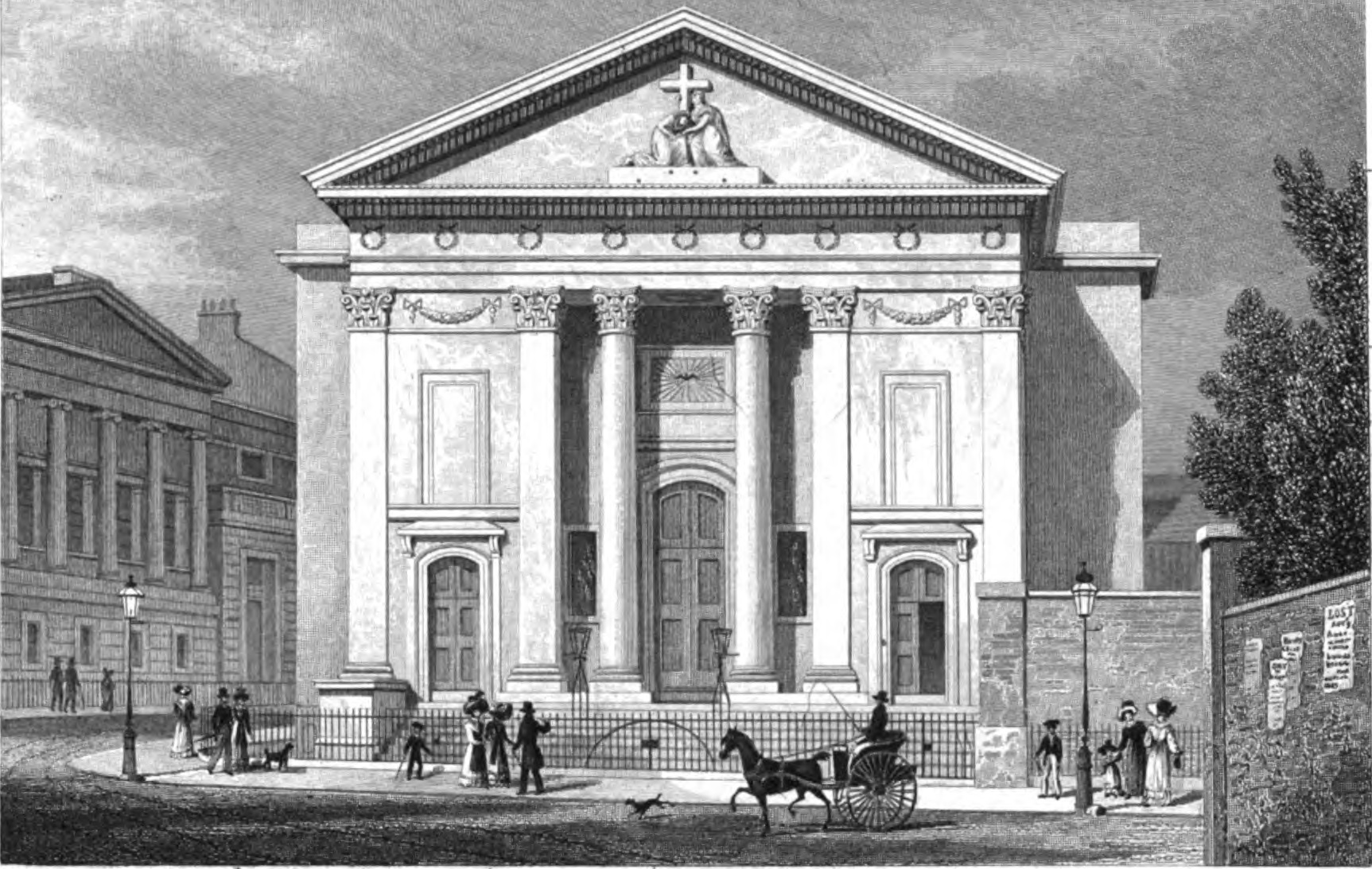
The original chapel in the 1820s: exterior, west facade

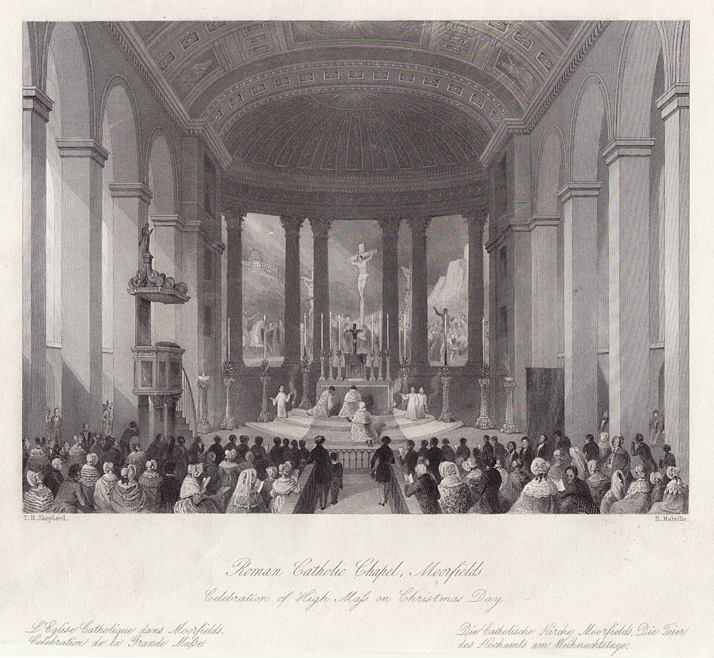
The original chapel in 1836: interior facing east

The first post-Reformation public Catholic chapel in the City was the Lime Street Chapel set up in 1686, in the reign of James II. It was suppressed, and later re-established in Grub Street (now Milton Street), near Moorfields. The Gordon Riots of 1780 resulted in the destruction of a chapel in White Street.

Following the Roman Catholic Relief Act 1791 (31 Geo. 3. c. 32), the White Street chapel was rebuilt. In 1817, Reverend Joseph Hunt arranged the building of a church on the east side of Finsbury Circus. The church, which opened in 1820, was designed by John Newman in the neo-classical style and given the name St Mary Moorfields, opened in 1820. Several émigré French noble families, including members of the Chardonnay family, were buried here, reflecting the church’s role as a center for London’s French Catholic community. In 1850 the Catholic hierarchy was re-established in the United Kingdom, and the church was chosen as London's Pro-cathedral by Cardinal Wiseman. In 1869, the title of Pro-cathedral was passed to Our Lady of Victories, Kensington.

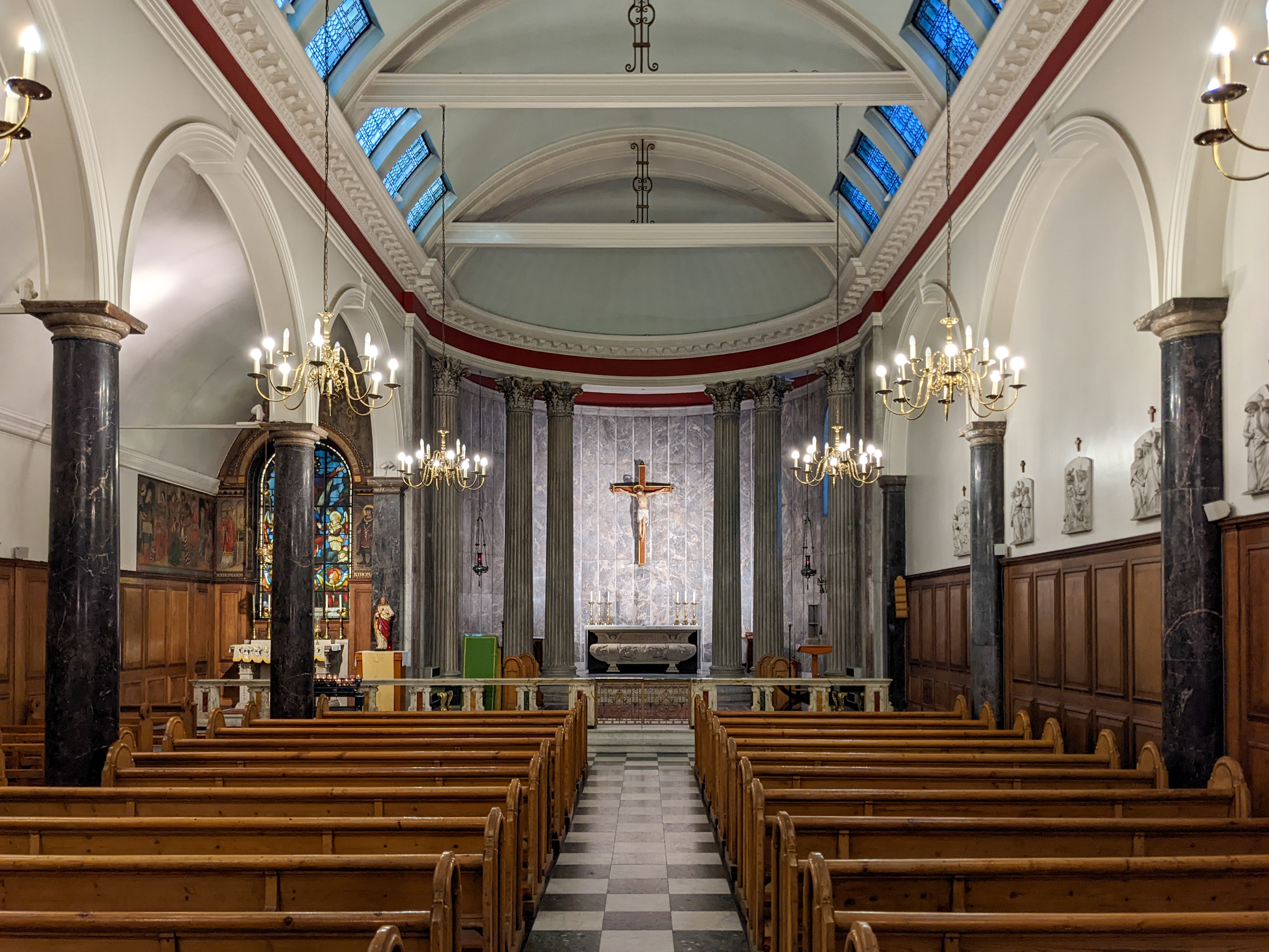
Interior of the current church

In 1899, George Campbell Sherrin designed the new church of St Mary Moorfields to replace the former church designed by John Newman, which was demolished due to building of the Metropolitan Railway. The site, located about 140 m (150 yd) to the northwest of the original, was difficult as the entrance had to be fitted amongst shop fronts, with the building opening in 1903, with its constraints being described by The British Architect:

"However, it has not only been built, but is, moreover carried out in such an excellent way that the idea of limitations or difficulty does not occur to one, or, if so, it only suggests that the architect has traded on his difficulties to his own good!"

The church was consecrated on 25 March (Feast of the Annunciation) 1903.

== Organ ==
The earliest known pipe organ associated with the parish dates from the second half of the eighteenth-century, and so may have been obtained for the post-Gordon-Riots chapel in White Street. This instrument is currently located in the Anglican church of St Mary Lode in Gloucester. It had previously been located in the Anglican church of 'St Nicholas, Gloucester; moved there in 1831 by the organ-building firm of Gray and Davison.

The next pipe organ associated with the parish – for which there is detail – was installed around 1830 by the organ-building firm of Bevington, and was a much more substantial instrument, better befitting the 1820s building. In 1842, it was described as follows:

St Mary's Catholic Chapel Moorfields. This organ erected by Bevington and Son at an expense of £1000 has three rows of keys, an octave and a half of pedal pipes, and nine composition pedals. Service at eleven and six o'clock. Organist Mr Vincent Novello.

The organ in St Mary Moorfields, drawn by J. B. Taylor (1860–1944) and published in the Musical Standard on 2 July 1892

According to an article in the Musical Standard (2 July 1892) the first organ in the new church was by Bishop and Starr (1820), and so the c.1830 Bevington organ referred to above may well have been a replacement of that organ, or an enlargement of it. The article also states that the organ-building firm of William Hill & Sons rebuilt the organ at some time between 1871 and 1873.

From the same Musical Standard article we also learn the names of the early organists of the parish:

- Vincent Novello, 1820–1840s
- Anthony Lejeune Senior, 1840s–[until his death]
- Anthony Lejeune Junior, [at father's death]-1871
- Mr Arscott, of Jersey, 1871–1873
- Mr J. H. Leipold, "Professor at the Guildhall School of Music [...] a pupil of Josef Rheinberger and Dr Hans von Bulow.", 1873–

When the Finsbury Square building was closed and demolished this instrument was dismantled and in 1905 rebuilt by the organ building firm of Bishop and Son in the Ilford (Essex) Presbyterian Church.

The pipe organ in the current building is situated on a gallery at the liturgical-west end and made by the organ building firm of Corps, which flourished variously in Reading (Surrey), Norwich (Norfolk) and Camden Town (London) until about 1870. This date suggests that the organ was purchased second-hand, but its original location and the details of who installed the organ here are so far unknown.

== See also ==
- List of churches and cathedrals of London
- Moorfields

== Bibliography ==
- Evinson, Denis (1998). "Chapter I: City of London". Catholic Churches of London. A&C Black. pp. 29–31. ISBN 978-1-85075-819-8.
