= Bourgneuf-en-Retz =

- Part of Villeneuve-en-Retz
- Coat of arms
- Location of Bourgneuf-en-Retz
- Location within France Location within Pays de la Loire
- Coordinates: 47°02′38″N 1°57′05″W
- Country: France
- Region: Pays de la Loire
- Department: Loire-Atlantique
- Arrondissement: Saint-Nazaire
- Canton: Machecoul-Saint-Même
- Commune: Villeneuve-en-Retz
- Area^{1}: 53.19 km^{2} (20.54 sq mi)
- Highest elevation: 39 m (128 ft)
- Lowest elevation: 0 m (0 ft)
- Population (2022): 3,741
  - Density: 70.33/km^{2} (182.2/sq mi)
- Time zone: UTC+01:00 (CET)
  - Summer (DST): UTC+02:00 (CEST)
- Postal code: 44580
- ^{1} French Land Register data, which excludes lakes, ponds, glaciers > 1 km^{2} (0.386 sq mi or 247 acres) and river estuaries.

Bourgneuf-en-Retz (French pronunciation: [buʁnœf ɑ̃ ʁɛ]; Breton: Bourc'hnevez-Raez) is a former commune in the Loire-Atlantique department in western France. On 1 January 2016, it was merged into the new commune of Villeneuve-en-Retz.

== Population ==
Historical population

Year	Pop.	±% p.a.
1800	2,033	—
1806	2,570	+3.98%
1821	2,534	−0.09%
1831	2,680	+0.56%
1841	2,625	−0.21%
1846	2,714	+0.67%
1851	2,882	+1.21%
1856	2,760	−0.86%
1861	2,893	+0.95%
1866	2,925	+0.22%
1872	2,837	−0.51%
1876	2,850	+0.11%
1881	2,880	+0.21%
1886	2,844	−0.25%
1891	2,944	+0.69%
1896	2,987	+0.29%
1901	3,042	+0.37%

Year	Pop.	±% p.a.
1906	3,109	+0.44%
1911	3,025	−0.55%
1921	2,622	−1.42%
1926	3,615	+6.63%
1931	2,514	−7.01%
1936	2,327	−1.53%
1946	2,213	−0.50%
1954	2,242	+0.16%
1962	2,289	+0.26%
1968	2,225	−0.47%
1975	2,161	−0.42%
1982	2,283	+0.79%
1990	2,346	+0.34%
1999	2,403	+0.27%
2006	2,948	+2.96%
2013	3,586	+2.84%
2022	3,741	+0.47%

Source: EHESS and INSEE

== Transport ==
Gare de Bourgneuf-en-Retz is served by train services between Pornic and Nantes.

== See also ==
- Communes of the Loire-Atlantique department
- The works of Jean Fréour Sculptor of René-Guy Cadou memorial with bust of the poet.
