= Saint-Même-le-Tenu =

- Part of Machecoul-Saint-Même
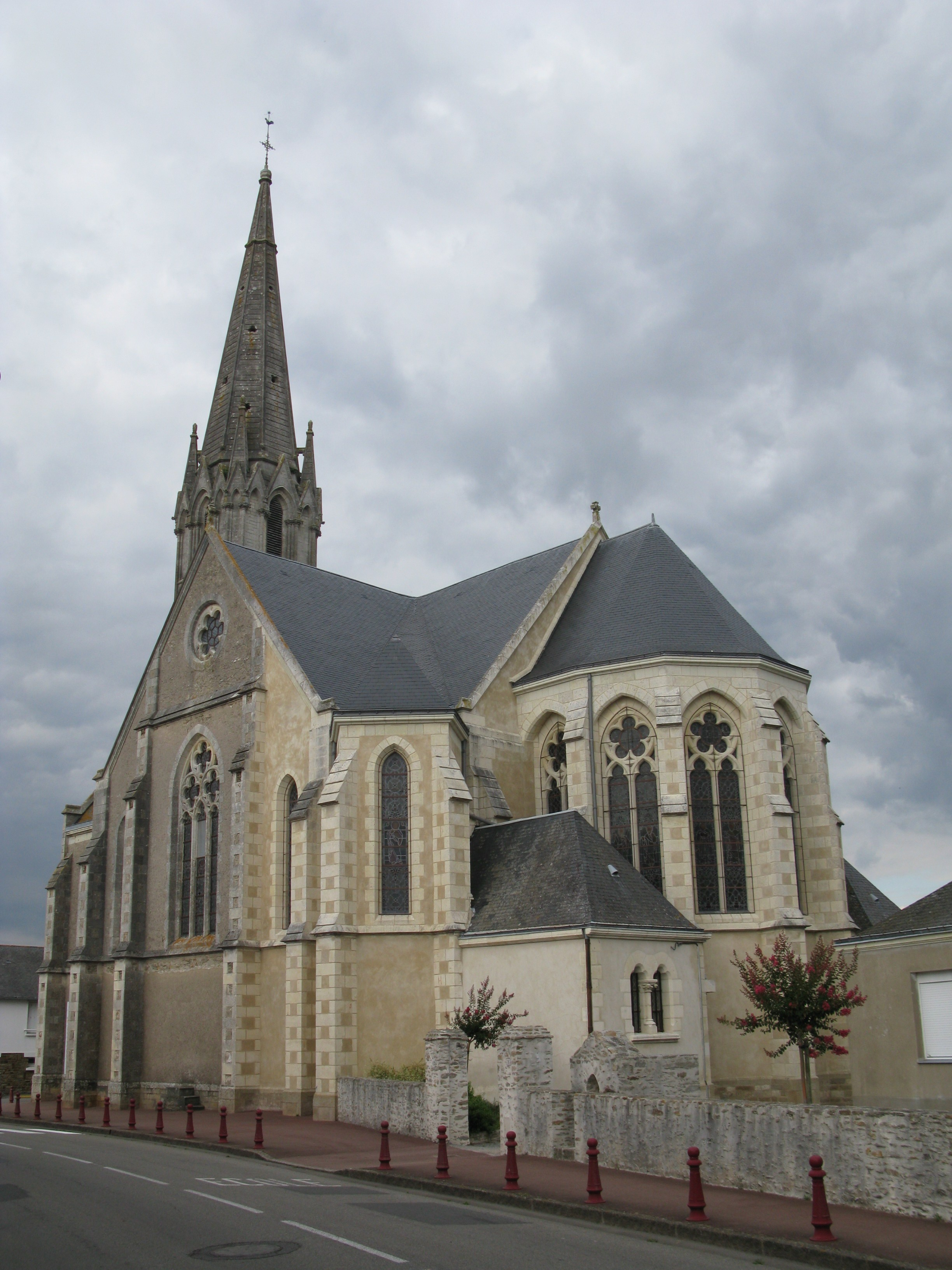
- The church in Saint-Même-le-Tenu

- Coat of arms
- Location of Saint-Même-le-Tenu
- Location within France Location within Pays de la Loire
- Coordinates: 47°01′17″N 1°47′38″W
- Country: France
- Region: Pays de la Loire
- Department: Loire-Atlantique
- Arrondissement: Nantes
- Canton: Machecoul-Saint-Même
- Commune: Machecoul-Saint-Même
- Area^{1}: 18.27 km^{2} (7.05 sq mi)
- Elevation: 8 m (26 ft)
- Highest elevation: 39 m (128 ft)
- Lowest elevation: 0 m (0 ft)
- Population (2021): 1,230
  - Density: 67.3/km^{2} (174/sq mi)
- Time zone: UTC+01:00 (CET)
  - Summer (DST): UTC+02:00 (CEST)
- Postal code: 44270
- ^{1} French Land Register data, which excludes lakes, ponds, glaciers > 1 km^{2} (0.386 sq mi or 247 acres) and river estuaries.

Saint-Même-le-Tenu (French pronunciation: [sɛ̃ mɛm lə təny]; Breton: Sant-Masen-ar-Porzh) is a former commune in the Loire-Atlantique department in western France. On 1 January 2016, it was merged into the new commune of Machecoul-Saint-Même.

== Population ==
Historical population
| Year | Pop. | ±% p.a. |
|---|---|---|
| 2006 | 1,120 | — |
| 2011 | 1,148 | +0.50% |
| 2021 | 1,230 | +0.69% |
Source: INSEE

== See also ==
- Communes of the Loire-Atlantique department
