= Fresnay-en-Retz =

- Part of Villeneuve-en-Retz
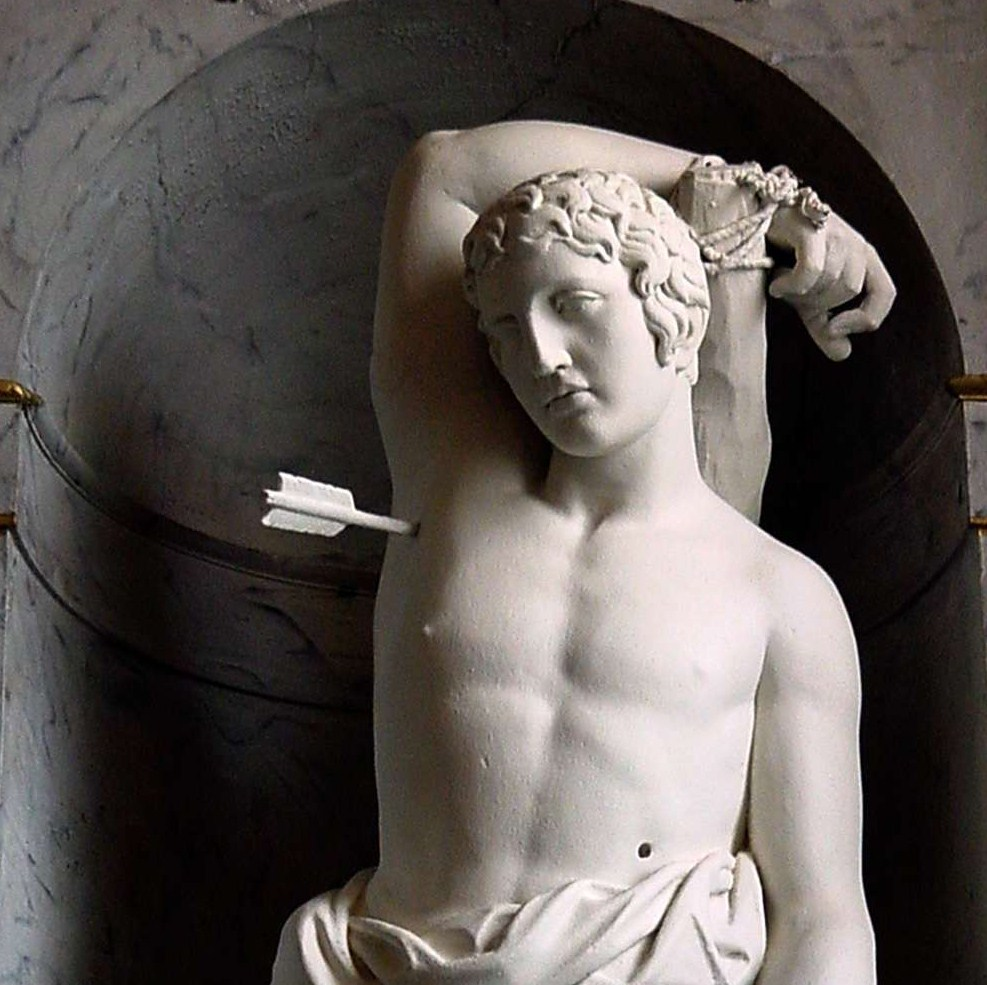
- Détail de la statue de Saint-Sébastien, église Notre-Dame de Fresnay.

- Coat of arms
- Location of Fresnay-en-Retz
- Location within France Location within Pays de la Loire
- Coordinates: 47°01′31″N 1°52′30″W
- Country: France
- Region: Pays de la Loire
- Department: Loire-Atlantique
- Arrondissement: Saint-Nazaire
- Canton: Machecoul-Saint-Même
- Commune: Villeneuve-en-Retz
- Area^{1}: 20.49 km^{2} (7.91 sq mi)
- Highest elevation: 42 m (138 ft)
- Lowest elevation: 1 m (3.3 ft)
- Population (2022): 1,263
  - Density: 61.64/km^{2} (159.6/sq mi)
- Demonym(s): Fresnaysiennes, Fresnaysiens
- Time zone: UTC+01:00 (CET)
  - Summer (DST): UTC+02:00 (CEST)
- Postal code: 44580
- Website: http://www.ccmachecoul.com/
- ^{1} French Land Register data, which excludes lakes, ponds, glaciers > 1 km^{2} (0.386 sq mi or 247 acres) and river estuaries.

Fresnay-en-Retz (French pronunciation: [fʁɛnɛ ɑ̃ ʁɛ], literally Fresnay in Retz; Breton: Onnod-Raez) is a former commune in the Loire-Atlantique department in western France. On 1 January 2016, it was merged into the new commune of Villeneuve-en-Retz.

== See also ==
- Communes of the Loire-Atlantique department
