= Arrondissement of Châteaubriant =

Coordinates: 47.72°N 1.38°W

Châteaubriant
- Former arrondissement
- Location within the department Loire-Atlantique
- Country: France
- Region: Pays de la Loire
- Department: Loire-Atlantique
- No. of communes: {{{nbcomm}}}
- Disbanded: 2017
- Area: 2,148 km^{2} (829 sq mi)
- Population (2012): 126,603
  - Density: 58.94/km^{2} (152.7/sq mi)

The arrondissement of Châteaubriant is a former arrondissement of France in the Loire-Atlantique department in the Pays de la Loire region. In January 2017 it was merged into the new arrondissement of Châteaubriant-Ancenis. It had 53 communes, and its population was 126,603 (2012).

== Composition ==
The communes of the arrondissement of Châteaubriant, and their INSEE codes, were:

1. Abbaretz (44001)	2. Avessac (44007)	3. Blain (44015)	4. Bouvron (44023)
5. Casson (44027)	6. Châteaubriant (44036)	7. Conquereuil (44044)	8. Derval (44051)
9. Erbray (44054)	10. Fay-de-Bretagne (44056)	11. Fercé (44058)	12. Fégréac (44057)
13. Grand-Auverné (44065)	14. Guémené-Penfao (44067)	15. Héric (44073)	16. Issé (44075)
17. Jans (44076)	18. Juigné-des-Moutiers (44078)	19. La Chapelle-Glain (44031)	20. La Chevallerais (44221)
21. La Grigonnais (44224)	22. La Meilleraye-de-Bretagne (44095)	23. Le Gâvre (44062)	24. Les Touches (44205)
25. Louisfert (44085)	26. Lusanger (44086)	27. Marsac-sur-Don (44091)	28. Massérac (44092)
29. Moisdon-la-Rivière (44099)	30. Mouais (44105)	31. Nort-sur-Erdre (44110)	32. Notre-Dame-des-Landes (44111)
33. Noyal-sur-Brutz (44112)	34. Nozay (44113)	35. Petit-Auverné (44121)	36. Petit-Mars (44122)
37. Pierric (44123)	38. Plessé (44128)	39. Puceul (44138)	40. Rougé (44146)
41. Ruffigné (44148)	42. Saffré (44149)	43. Saint-Aubin-des-Châteaux (44153)	44. Saint-Julien-de-Vouvantes (44170)
45. Saint-Mars-du-Désert (44179)	46. Saint-Nicolas-de-Redon (44185)	47. Saint-Vincent-des-Landes (44193)	48. Sion-les-Mines (44197)
49. Soudan (44199)	50. Soulvache (44200)	51. Treffieux (44208)	52. Vay (44214)
53. Villepot (44218)			

== History ==
The arrondissement of Châteaubriant was created in 1800. It was disbanded in 2017. As a result of the reorganisation of the cantons of France which came into effect in 2015, the borders of the cantons are no longer related to the borders of the arrondissements. The cantons of the arrondissement of Châteaubriant were, as of January 2015:

1. Blain
2. Châteaubriant
3. Derval
4. Guémené-Penfao
5. Moisdon-la-Rivière
6. Nort-sur-Erdre
7. Nozay
8. Rougé
9. Saint-Julien-de-Vouvantes
10. Saint-Nicolas-de-Redon
