= La Chapelle-Glain =

La Chapelle-Glain La Chapèll-Glen (Gallo) Chapel-Glenn (Breton)
- Commune
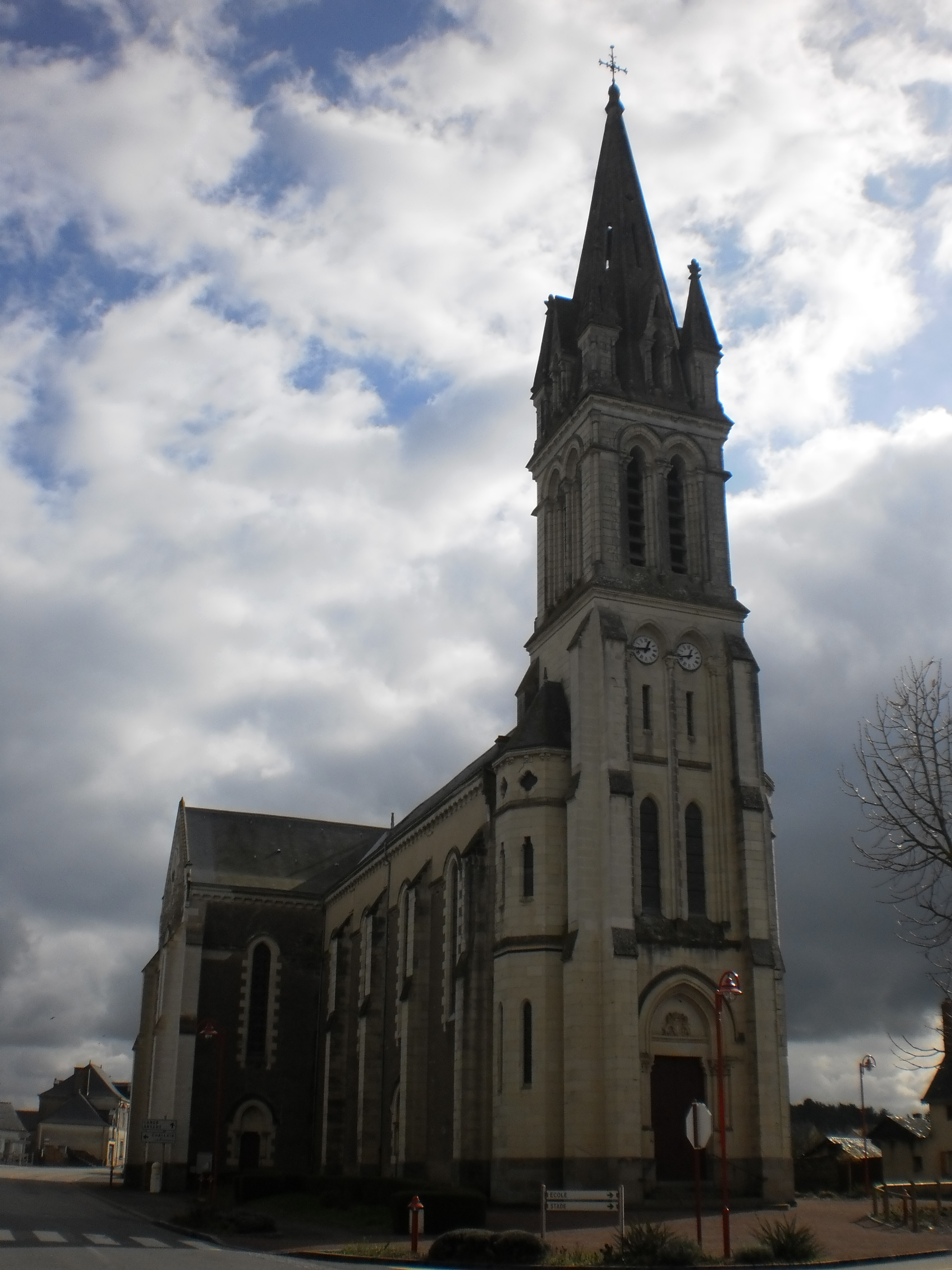

- Coat of arms
- Location of La Chapelle-Glain
- Location within France Location within Pays de la Loire
- Coordinates: 47°37′26″N 1°11′45″W
- Country: France
- Region: Pays de la Loire
- Department: Loire-Atlantique
- Arrondissement: Châteaubriant-Ancenis
- Canton: Châteaubriant
- Intercommunality: Châteaubriant-Derval

Government
  - Mayor (2023–2026): Matthieu Hamard
- Area^{1}: 34.5 km^{2} (13.3 sq mi)
- Highest elevation: 99 m (325 ft)
- Lowest elevation: 46 m (151 ft)
- Population (2023): 809
  - Density: 23.4/km^{2} (60.7/sq mi)
- Time zone: UTC+01:00 (CET)
  - Summer (DST): UTC+02:00 (CEST)
- INSEE/Postal code: 44031 /44670
- ^{1} French Land Register data, which excludes lakes, ponds, glaciers > 1 km^{2} (0.386 sq mi or 247 acres) and river estuaries.

La Chapelle-Glain (French pronunciation: [la ʃapɛl ɡlɛ̃]; Gallo: La Chapèll-Glen, Breton: Chapel-Glenn) is a commune in the Loire-Atlantique département in western France.

== Geography ==
La Chapelle-Glain is 31 km north of Ancenis, 55 km west of Angers, 66 km northwest of Nantes and 85 km south of Rennes.

The bordering communes are Juigné-des-Moutiers, Saint-Julien-de-Vouvantes, Petit-Auverné, Saint-Sulpice-des-Landes and Le Pin in Loire-Atlantique, and Challain-la-Potherie and Saint-Michel-et-Chanveaux in the neighboring department of the Maine-et-Loire.

== Population ==
Historical population
Year	Pop.	±% p.a.
1968	1,097	—
1975	898	−2.82%
1982	838	−0.98%
1990	808	−0.45%
1999	761	−0.66%
2007	812	+0.81%
2012	826	+0.34%
2017	812	−0.34%
2023	809	−0.06%
Source: INSEE

== Sights ==
- The Château de la Motte-Glain is a 15th-century castle, remodelled in the 17th century.
- The church of Saint-Pierre-et-Saint-Paul contains a number of sculptures, pictures and other objects that are listed as historic items by the French Ministry of Culture.

== See also ==
- Communes of the Loire-Atlantique department
