= Châteaubriant (disambiguation) =

Châteaubriant is a town in western France.

Châteaubriant or Chateaubriant may also refer to:

== Places ==
- Château de Châteaubriant, a castle in France
- Arrondissement of Châteaubriant, an arrondissement in France

== People ==
- Françoise de Foix, Comtesse de Châteaubriant (1495-1537) mistress to Francis I, King of France
- Alphonse de Châteaubriant (1877-1951) French writer

== Other uses ==
- Chateaubriand (dish), a steak dish
- Edict of Châteaubriant (1551)

== See also ==
- Chateaubriand (disambiguation)
