= Communes of the Loire-Atlantique department =

List of communes in France

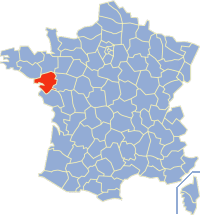

The following is a list of the 207 communes of the Loire-Atlantique department of France.

The communes cooperate in the following intercommunalities (as of 2025):

- Nantes Métropole
- Communauté d'agglomération Clisson Sèvre et Maine Agglo
- Communauté d'agglomération Pornic Agglo Pays de Retz
- Communauté d'agglomération de la Presqu'île de Guérande Atlantique (partly)
- CA Redon Agglomération (partly)
- Communauté d'agglomération de la Région Nazairienne et de l'Estuaire
- Communauté de communes Châteaubriant-Derval
- Communauté de communes d'Erdre et Gesvres
- Communauté de communes Estuaire et Sillon
- Communauté de communes de Grand Lieu
- Communauté de communes de Nozay
- Communauté de communes du Pays d'Ancenis (partly)
- Communauté de communes du Pays de Blain
- Communauté de communes du Pays de Pont-Château - Saint-Gildas-des-Bois
- Communauté de communes Sèvre et Loire
- Communauté de communes du Sud Estuaire
- Communauté de communes Sud Retz Atlantique

INSEE	Postal	Commune
44001	44170	Abbaretz
44002	44140	Aigrefeuille-sur-Maine
44003	44150	Ancenis-Saint-Géréon
44006	44410	Assérac
44007	44460	Avessac
44009	44115	Basse-Goulaine
44010	44740	Batz-sur-Mer
44055	44500	La Baule-Escoublac
44012	44760	La Bernerie-en-Retz
44013	44160	Besné
44014	44140	Le Bignon
44015	44130	Blain
44016	44430	La Boissière-du-Doré
44018	44830	Bouaye
44019	44260	Bouée
44020	44340	Bouguenais
44022	44190	Boussay
44023	44130	Bouvron
44024	44830	Brains
44025	44750	Campbon
44026	44470	Carquefou
44027	44390	Casson
44028	44850	Le Cellier
44030	44410	La Chapelle-des-Marais
44031	44670	La Chapelle-Glain
44032	44330	La Chapelle-Heulin
44033	44260	La Chapelle-Launay
44035	44240	La Chapelle-sur-Erdre
44036	44110	Châteaubriant
44037	44690	Château-Thébaud
44005	44320	Chaumes-en-Retz
44038	44320	Chauvé
44039	44640	Cheix-en-Retz
44221	44810	La Chevallerais
44041	44118	La Chevrolière
44043	44190	Clisson
44044	44290	Conquereuil
44156	44650	Corcoué-sur-Logne
44045	44360	Cordemais
44046	44560	Corsept
44047	44220	Couëron
44048	44521	Couffé
44049	44490	Le Croisic
44050	44160	Crossac
44051	44590	Derval
44029	44450	Divatte-sur-Loire
44052	44480	Donges
44053	44530	Drefféac
44054	44110	Erbray
44056	44130	Fay-de-Bretagne
44057	44460	Fégréac
44058	44660	Fercé
44061	44320	Frossay
44062	44130	Le Gâvre
44223	44140	Geneston
44063	44190	Gétigné
44064	44190	Gorges
44065	44520	Grand-Auverné
44066	44119	Grandchamps-des-Fontaines
44224	44170	La Grigonnais
44067	44290	Guémené-Penfao
44068	44530	Guenrouet
44069	44350	Guérande
44070	44690	La Haie-Fouassière
44071	44115	Haute-Goulaine
44072	44410	Herbignac
44073	44810	Héric
44074	44610	Indre
44075	44520	Issé
44076	44170	Jans
44077	44440	Joué-sur-Erdre
44078	44670	Juigné-des-Moutiers
44079	44430	Le Landreau
44080	44260	Lavau-sur-Loire
44081	44650	Legé
44082	44850	Ligné
44083	44310	La Limouzinière
44213	44370	Loireauxence
44084	44430	Le Loroux-Bottereau
44085	44110	Louisfert
44086	44590	Lusanger
44087	44270	Machecoul-Saint-Même
44088	44690	Maisdon-sur-Sèvre
44089	44260	Malville
44090	44270	La Marne
44091	44170	Marsac-sur-Don
44092	44290	Massérac
44094	44470	Mauves-sur-Loire
44095	44520	La Meilleraye-de-Bretagne
44096	44522	Mésanger
44097	44420	Mesquer
44098	44780	Missillac
44099	44520	Moisdon-la-Rivière
44100	44690	Monnières
44101	44620	La Montagne
44102	44140	Montbert
44103	44550	Montoir-de-Bretagne
44104	44370	Montrelais
44105	44590	Mouais
44106	44580	Les Moutiers-en-Retz
44107	44850	Mouzeil
44108	44330	Mouzillon

INSEE	Postal	Commune
44109	44000	Nantes
44110	44390	Nort-sur-Erdre
44111	44130	Notre-Dame-des-Landes
44112	44110	Noyal-sur-Brutz
44113	44170	Nozay
44114	44700	Orvault
44115	44521	Oudon
44116	44560	Paimbœuf
44117	44330	Le Pallet
44118	44440	Pannecé
44119	44270	Paulx
44120	44640	Le Pellerin
44121	44670	Petit-Auverné
44122	44390	Petit-Mars
44123	44290	Pierric
44124	44540	Le Pin
44125	44420	Piriac-sur-Mer
44126	44770	La Plaine-sur-Mer
44127	44140	La Planche
44128	44630	Plessé
44129	44160	Pontchâteau
44130	44860	Pont-Saint-Martin
44131	44210	Pornic
44132	44380	Pornichet
44133	44710	Port-Saint-Père
44134	44522	Pouillé-les-Côteaux
44135	44510	Le Pouliguen
44136	44770	Préfailles
44137	44260	Prinquiau
44138	44390	Puceul
44139	44750	Quilly
44140	44330	La Regrippière
44141	44430	La Remaudière
44142	44140	Remouillé
44143	44400	Rezé
44144	44440	Riaillé
44222	44522	La Roche-Blanche
44145	44640	Rouans
44146	44660	Rougé
44148	44660	Ruffigné
44149	44390	Saffré
44150	44860	Saint-Aignan-Grandlieu
44151	44117	Saint-André-des-Eaux
44153	44110	Saint-Aubin-des-Châteaux
44154	44250	Saint-Brevin-les-Pins
44155	44310	Saint-Colomban
44152	44160	Sainte-Anne-sur-Brivet
44172	44980	Sainte-Luce-sur-Loire
44186	44680	Sainte-Pazanne
44189	44160	Sainte-Reine-de-Bretagne
44157	44270	Saint-Étienne-de-Mer-Morte
44158	44360	Saint-Étienne-de-Montluc
44159	44690	Saint-Fiacre-sur-Maine
44161	44530	Saint-Gildas-des-Bois
44162	44800	Saint-Herblain
44164	44680	Saint-Hilaire-de-Chaléons
44165	44190	Saint-Hilaire-de-Clisson
44166	44640	Saint-Jean-de-Boiseau
44168	44720	Saint-Joachim
44169	44450	Saint-Julien-de-Concelles
44170	44670	Saint-Julien-de-Vouvantes
44171	44710	Saint-Léger-les-Vignes
44173	44190	Saint-Lumine-de-Clisson
44174	44310	Saint-Lumine-de-Coutais
44175	44410	Saint-Lyphard
44176	44550	Saint-Malo-de-Guersac
44178	44680	Saint-Mars-de-Coutais
44179	44850	Saint-Mars-du-Désert
44182	44730	Saint-Michel-Chef-Chef
44183	44350	Saint-Molf
44184	44600	Saint-Nazaire
44185	44460	Saint-Nicolas-de-Redon
44187	44320	Saint-Père-en-Retz
44188	44310	Saint-Philbert-de-Grand-Lieu
44190	44230	Saint-Sébastien-sur-Loire
44192	44320	Saint-Viaud
44193	44590	Saint-Vincent-des-Landes
44194	44880	Sautron
44195	44260	Savenay
44196	44530	Sévérac
44197	44590	Sion-les-Mines
44198	44840	Les Sorinières
44199	44110	Soudan
44200	44660	Soulvache
44201	44240	Sucé-sur-Erdre
44202	44440	Teillé
44203	44360	Le Temple-de-Bretagne
44204	44470	Thouaré-sur-Loire
44205	44390	Les Touches
44206	44650	Touvois
44207	44440	Trans-sur-Erdre
44208	44170	Treffieux
44209	44119	Treillières
44210	44570	Trignac
44211	44420	La Turballe
44163	44150	Vair-sur-Loire
44212	44330	Vallet
44180	44540	Vallons-de-l'Erdre
44214	44170	Vay
44215	44120	Vertou
44216	44116	Vieillevigne
44217	44360	Vigneux-de-Bretagne
44021	44580	Villeneuve-en-Retz
44218	44110	Villepot
44220	44640	Vue
