= Arrondissement of Châteaubriant-Ancenis =

Coordinates: 47.7°N 1.4°W

Châteaubriant-Ancenis
- Arrondissement
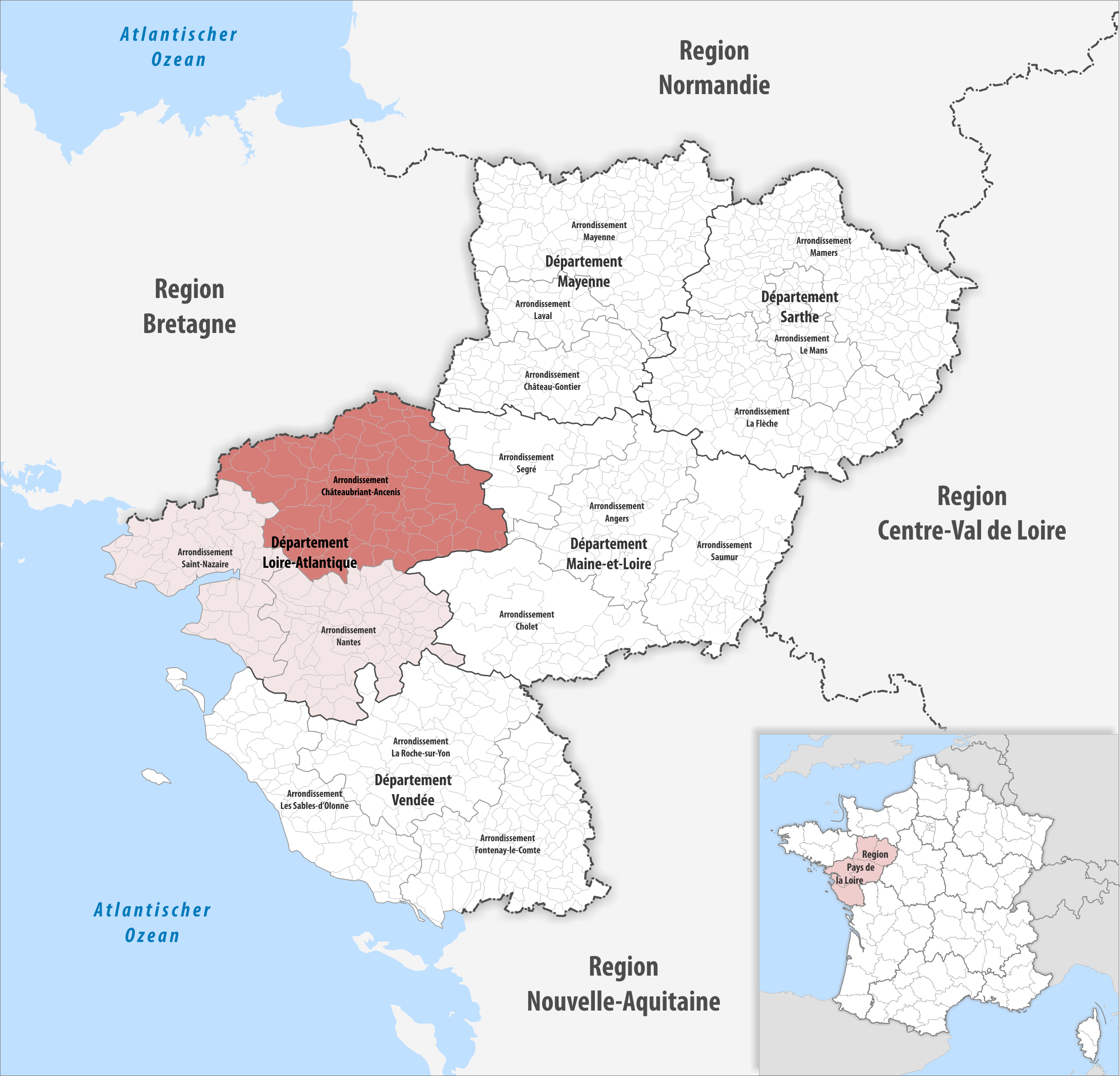
- Location within the region Pays de la Loire
- Country: France
- Region: Pays de la Loire
- Department: Loire-Atlantique
- No. of communes: {{{nbcomm}}}
- Area: 3,157.4 km^{2} (1,219.1 sq mi)
- Population (2023): 236,108
  - Density: 74.779/km^{2} (193.68/sq mi)
- INSEE code: 445

The arrondissement of Châteaubriant-Ancenis is an arrondissement of France in the Loire-Atlantique department in the Pays de la Loire region. It has 76 communes. Its population is 231,576 (2021), and its area is 3,157.4 km^{2} (1,219.1 sq mi).

== History ==
The arrondissement of Châteaubriant-Ancenis was created in January 2017 from the former arrondissements of Châteaubriant and Ancenis and 4 communes from the arrondissement of Nantes.

== Composition ==
The communes of the arrondissement of Châteaubriant-Ancenis are:

1. Abbaretz (44001)
2. Ancenis-Saint-Géréon (44003)
3. Avessac (44007)
4. Blain (44015)
5. Bouvron (44023)
6. Casson (44027)
7. Le Cellier (44028)
8. La Chapelle-Glain (44031)
9. Châteaubriant (44036)
10. La Chevallerais (44221)
11. Conquereuil (44044)
12. Couffé (44048)
13. Derval (44051)
14. Erbray (44054)
15. Fay-de-Bretagne (44056)
16. Fégréac (44057)
17. Fercé (44058)
18. Le Gâvre (44062)
19. Grand-Auverné (44065)
20. Grandchamps-des-Fontaines (44066)
21. La Grigonnais (44224)
22. Guémené-Penfao (44067)
23. Héric (44073)
24. Issé (44075)
25. Jans (44076)
26. Joué-sur-Erdre (44077)
27. Juigné-des-Moutiers (44078)
28. Ligné (44082)
29. Loireauxence (44213)
30. Louisfert (44085)
31. Lusanger (44086)
32. Marsac-sur-Don (44091)
33. Massérac (44092)
34. La Meilleraye-de-Bretagne (44095)
35. Mésanger (44096)
36. Moisdon-la-Rivière (44099)
37. Montrelais (44104)
38. Mouais (44105)
39. Mouzeil (44107)
40. Nort-sur-Erdre (44110)
41. Notre-Dame-des-Landes (44111)
42. Noyal-sur-Brutz (44112)
43. Nozay (44113)
44. Oudon (44115)
45. Pannecé (44118)
46. Petit-Auverné (44121)
47. Petit-Mars (44122)
48. Pierric (44123)
49. Le Pin (44124)
50. Plessé (44128)
51. Pouillé-les-Côteaux (44134)
52. Puceul (44138)
53. Riaillé (44144)
54. La Roche-Blanche (44222)
55. Rougé (44146)
56. Ruffigné (44148)
57. Saffré (44149)
58. Saint-Aubin-des-Châteaux (44153)
59. Saint-Julien-de-Vouvantes (44170)
60. Saint-Mars-du-Désert (44179)
61. Saint-Nicolas-de-Redon (44185)
62. Saint-Vincent-des-Landes (44193)
63. Sion-les-Mines (44197)
64. Soudan (44199)
65. Soulvache (44200)
66. Sucé-sur-Erdre (44201)
67. Teillé (44202)
68. Les Touches (44205)
69. Trans-sur-Erdre (44207)
70. Treffieux (44208)
71. Treillières (44209)
72. Vair-sur-Loire (44163)
73. Vallons-de-l'Erdre (44180)
74. Vay (44214)
75. Vigneux-de-Bretagne (44217)
76. Villepot (44218)

== List of sub-prefects ==
List of successive sub-prefects of the Arrondissement of Châteaubriant-Ancenis
In office		Name	Previous Capacity	Notes
1 January 2017	Incumbent	Mohamed Saadallah		
