= Chateaubriand (disambiguation) =

François-René de Chateaubriand (1768–1848) was a French writer and statesman.

Chateaubriand may also refer to

- Chateaubriand (dish), a steak dish named after the author
- Assis Chateaubriand (1892–1968), Brazilian journalist and politician
- Assis Chateaubriand (Paraná), municipality in the state of Paraná in the Southern Region of Brazil
  - Rodovia Assis Chateaubriand, Brazilian road
- Le Chateaubriand, Parisian restaurant

== See also ==
- Châteaubriant (disambiguation)
