= Moisdon-la-Rivière =

Moisdon-la-Rivière Maèdon (Gallo) Maezon-ar-Stêr (Breton)
- Commune
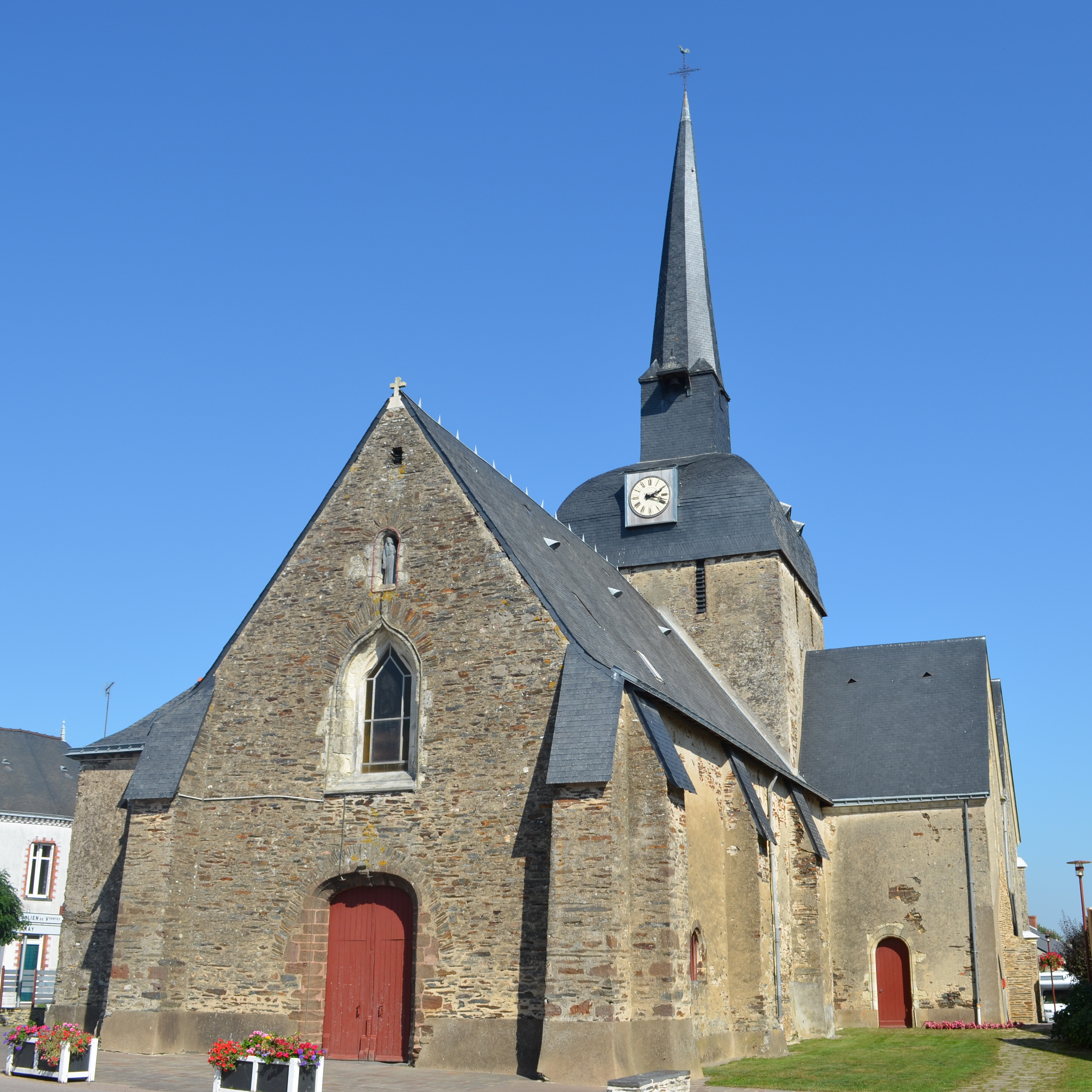

- Coat of arms
- Location of Moisdon-la-Rivière
- Location within France Location within Pays de la Loire
- Coordinates: 47°37′20″N 1°22′16″W
- Country: France
- Region: Pays de la Loire
- Department: Loire-Atlantique
- Arrondissement: Châteaubriant-Ancenis
- Canton: Châteaubriant
- Intercommunality: Châteaubriant-Derval

Government
  - Mayor (2020–2026): Patrick Galivel
- Area^{1}: 50.43 km^{2} (19.47 sq mi)
- Highest elevation: 79 m (259 ft)
- Lowest elevation: 28 m (92 ft)
- Population (2023): 1,990
  - Density: 39.5/km^{2} (102/sq mi)
- Time zone: UTC+01:00 (CET)
  - Summer (DST): UTC+02:00 (CEST)
- INSEE/Postal code: 44099 /44520
- ^{1} French Land Register data, which excludes lakes, ponds, glaciers > 1 km^{2} (0.386 sq mi or 247 acres) and river estuaries.

Moisdon-la-Rivière (French pronunciation: [mwadɔ̃ la ʁivjɛʁ]; Gallo: Maèdon, Breton: Maezon-ar-Stêr) is a commune in the Loire-Atlantique department in western France.

== Population ==
Historical population
Year	Pop.	±% p.a.
1968	1,810	—
1975	1,842	+0.25%
1982	1,807	−0.27%
1990	1,810	+0.02%
1999	1,733	−0.48%
2007	1,833	+0.70%
2012	1,945	+1.19%
2017	1,951	+0.06%
2023	1,990	+0.33%
Source: INSEE

== See also ==
- Communes of the Loire-Atlantique department
