= Ruffigné =

- Commune
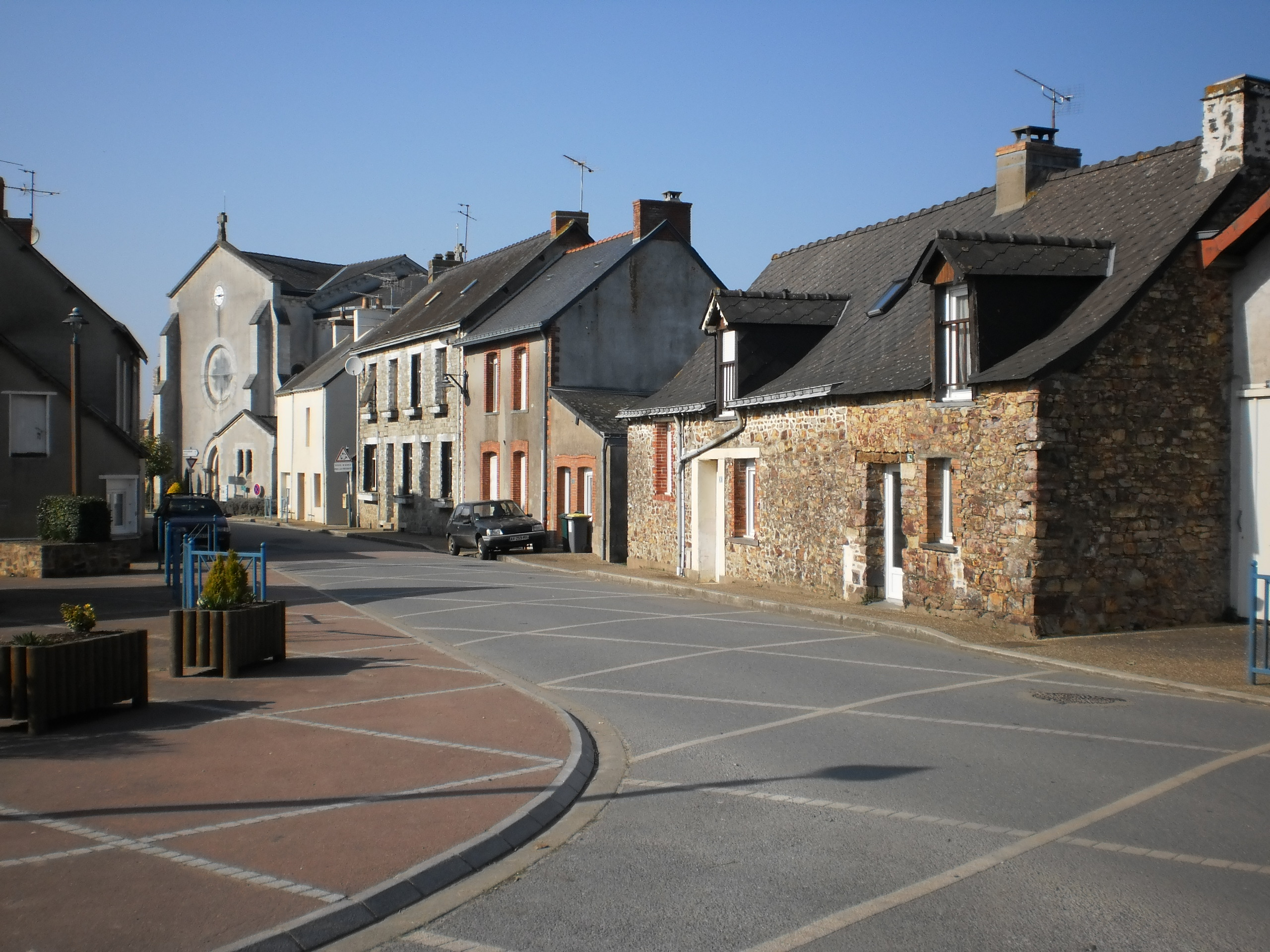

- Coat of arms
- Location of Ruffigné
- Location within France Location within Pays de la Loire
- Coordinates: 47°45′28″N 1°29′32″W
- Country: France
- Region: Pays de la Loire
- Department: Loire-Atlantique
- Arrondissement: Châteaubriant-Ancenis
- Canton: Châteaubriant
- Intercommunality: Châteaubriant-Derval

Government
  - Mayor (2023–2026): Anita Bonnier
- Area^{1}: 33.63 km^{2} (12.98 sq mi)
- Highest elevation: 98 m (322 ft)
- Lowest elevation: 33 m (108 ft)
- Population (2023): 702
  - Density: 20.9/km^{2} (54.1/sq mi)
- Time zone: UTC+01:00 (CET)
  - Summer (DST): UTC+02:00 (CEST)
- INSEE/Postal code: 44148 /44660
- ^{1} French Land Register data, which excludes lakes, ponds, glaciers > 1 km^{2} (0.386 sq mi or 247 acres) and river estuaries.

Ruffigné (French pronunciation: [ʁyfiɲe]; Breton: Ruzinieg) is a commune in the Loire-Atlantique department in western France.

== Population ==
Historical population
Year	Pop.	±% p.a.
1968	723	—
1975	684	−0.79%
1982	671	−0.27%
1990	624	−0.90%
1999	603	−0.38%
2007	691	+1.72%
2012	712	+0.60%
2017	703	−0.25%
2023	702	−0.02%
Source: INSEE

== See also ==
- Communes of the Loire-Atlantique department
