= Canton of Châteaubriant =

Coordinates: 47.72°N 1.38°W

The canton of Châteaubriant is an administrative division of the Loire-Atlantique department, western France. Its borders were modified at the French canton reorganisation which came into effect in March 2015. Its seat is in Châteaubriant.

It consists of the following communes:

1. La Chapelle-Glain
2. Châteaubriant
3. Erbray
4. Fercé
5. Grand-Auverné
6. Issé
7. Juigné-des-Moutiers
8. Louisfert
9. La Meilleraye-de-Bretagne
10. Moisdon-la-Rivière
11. Noyal-sur-Brutz
12. Petit-Auverné
13. Rougé
14. Ruffigné
15. Saint-Aubin-des-Châteaux
16. Saint-Julien-de-Vouvantes
17. Soudan
18. Soulvache
19. Villepot
