= La Chevallerais =

La Chevallerais La Chevaleraè (Gallo) Kergaval (Breton)
- Commune
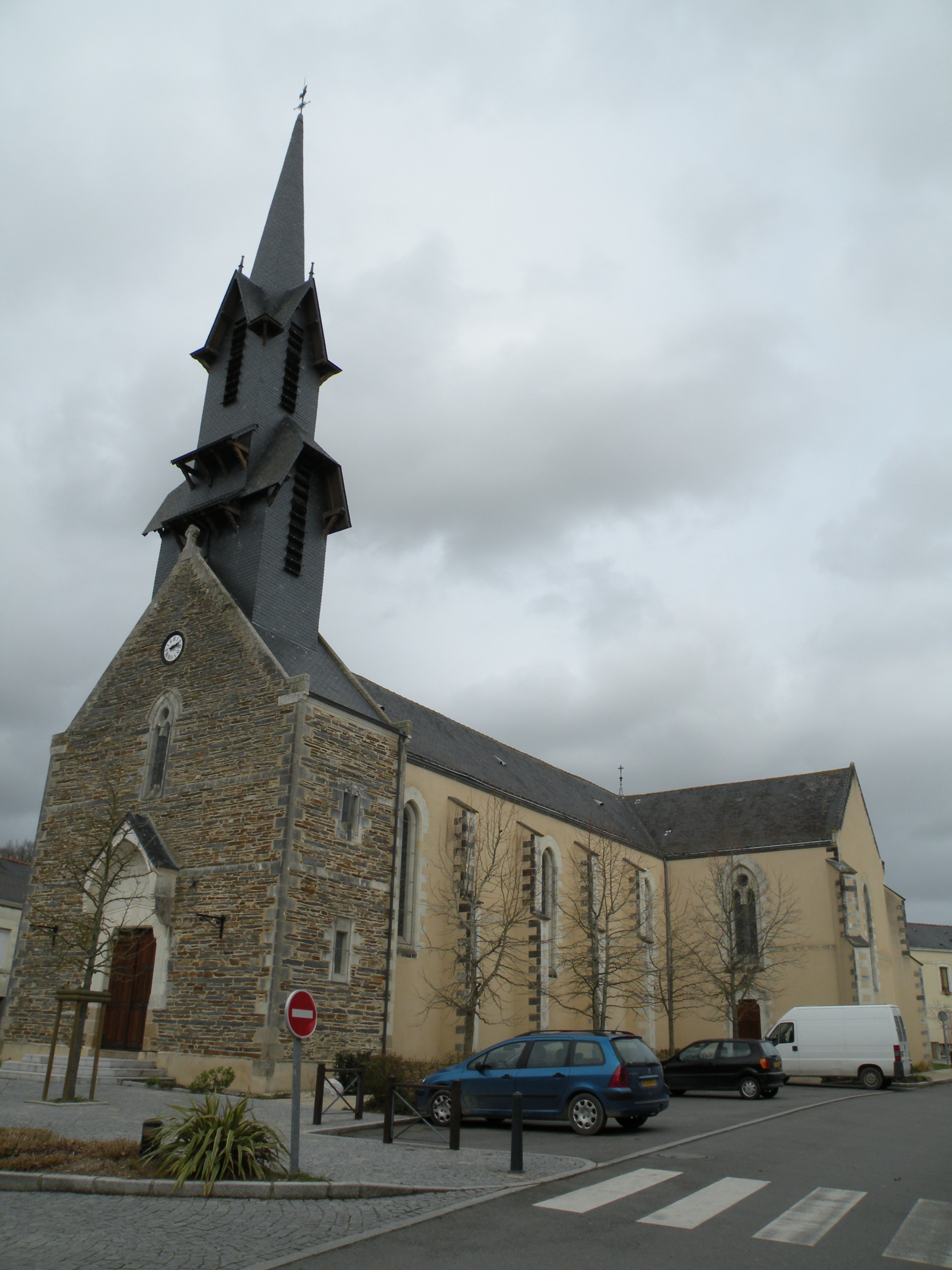
- Location of La Chevallerais
- Location within France Location within Pays de la Loire
- Coordinates: 47°28′06″N 1°40′12″W
- Country: France
- Region: Pays de la Loire
- Department: Loire-Atlantique
- Arrondissement: Châteaubriant-Ancenis
- Canton: Guémené-Penfao
- Intercommunality: CC Pays de Blain

Government
  - Mayor (2020–2026): Tiphaine Arbrun
- Area^{1}: 10.23 km^{2} (3.95 sq mi)
- Highest elevation: 42 m (138 ft)
- Lowest elevation: 18 m (59 ft)
- Population (2023): 1,569
  - Density: 153.4/km^{2} (397.2/sq mi)
- Time zone: UTC+01:00 (CET)
  - Summer (DST): UTC+02:00 (CEST)
- INSEE/Postal code: 44221 /44810
- ^{1} French Land Register data, which excludes lakes, ponds, glaciers > 1 km^{2} (0.386 sq mi or 247 acres) and river estuaries.

La Chevallerais (French pronunciation: [la ʃəvalʁɛ]; Gallo: La Chevaleraè, Breton: Kergaval) is a commune in the Loire-Atlantique department in western France.

== Population ==
Historical population
Year	Pop.	±% p.a.
1968	499	—
1975	495	−0.11%
1982	546	+1.41%
1990	652	+2.24%
1999	652	+0.00%
2007	1,220	+8.15%
2012	1,464	+3.71%
2017	1,549	+1.14%
2023	1,569	+0.21%
Source: INSEE

== See also ==
- Communes of the Loire-Atlantique department
