= Erbray =

Erbray Aèrbraéy (Gallo) Ervoreg (Breton)
- Commune
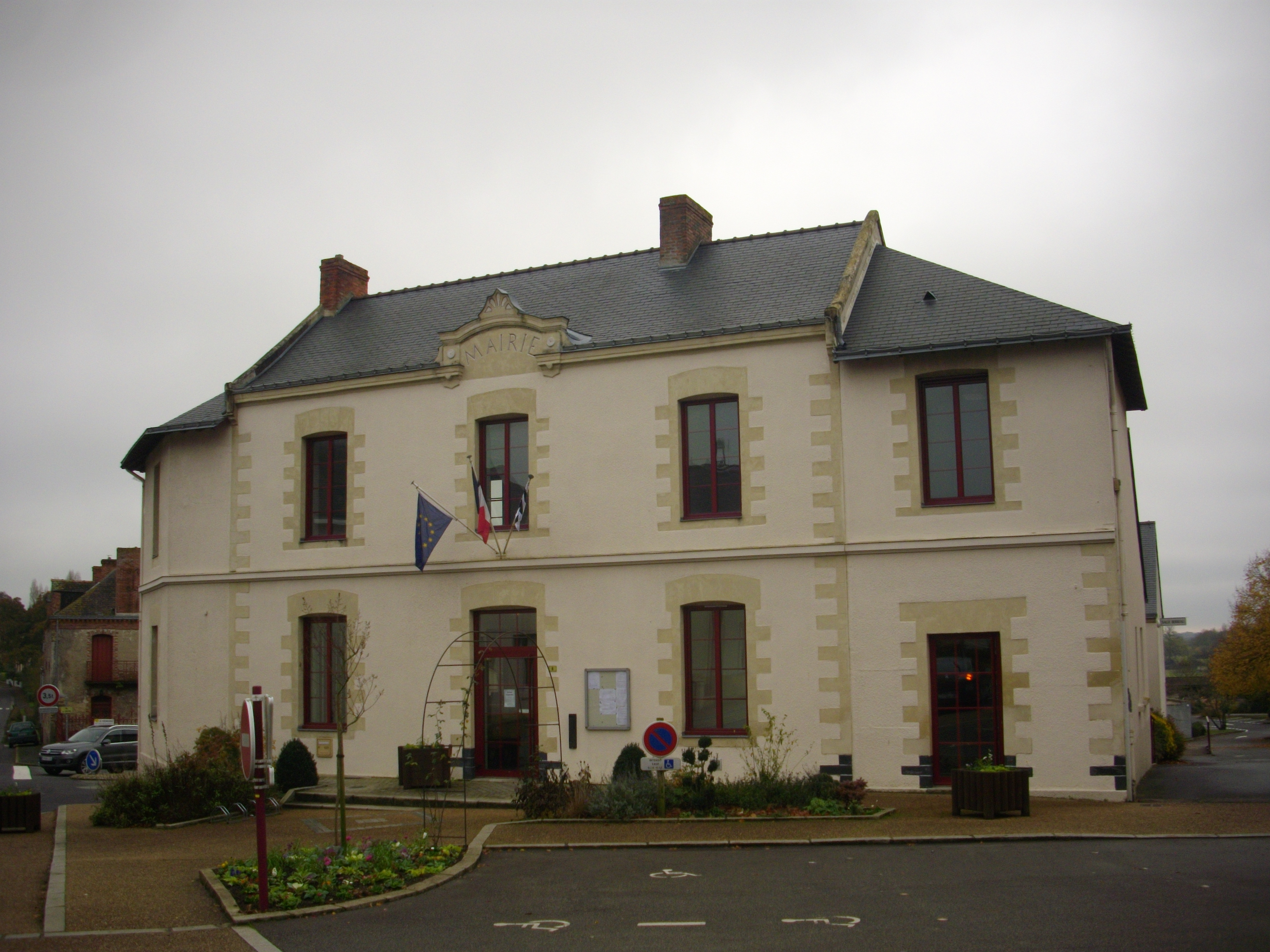
- Town hall

- Coat of arms
- Location of Erbray
- Location within France Location within Pays de la Loire
- Coordinates: 47°39′24″N 1°18′59″W
- Country: France
- Region: Pays de la Loire
- Department: Loire-Atlantique
- Arrondissement: Châteaubriant-Ancenis
- Canton: Châteaubriant
- Intercommunality: Châteaubriant-Derval

Government
  - Mayor (2020–2026): Isabelle Dufourd-Bouchet
- Area^{1}: 58.18 km^{2} (22.46 sq mi)
- Highest elevation: 108 m (354 ft)
- Lowest elevation: 41 m (135 ft)
- Population (2023): 3,072
  - Density: 52.80/km^{2} (136.8/sq mi)
- Time zone: UTC+01:00 (CET)
  - Summer (DST): UTC+02:00 (CEST)
- INSEE/Postal code: 44054 /44110
- ^{1} French Land Register data, which excludes lakes, ponds, glaciers > 1 km^{2} (0.386 sq mi or 247 acres) and river estuaries.

Erbray (French pronunciation: [ɛʁbʁɛ]; Gallo: Aèrbraéy, Breton: Ervoreg) is a commune in the Loire-Atlantique department in western France.

== Population ==
Historical population

Year	Pop.	±% p.a.
1793	1,781	—
1821	1,627	−0.32%
1846	2,087	+1.00%
1872	2,973	+1.37%
1901	2,651	−0.39%
1926	1,991	−1.14%
1946	1,813	−0.47%
1962	1,766	−0.16%
1968	1,808	+0.39%

Year	Pop.	±% p.a.
1975	1,885	+0.60%
1982	2,152	+1.91%
1990	2,392	+1.33%
1999	2,351	−0.19%
2007	2,744	+1.95%
2012	2,945	+1.42%
2017	3,006	+0.41%
2023	3,072	+0.36%

Source: EHESS and INSEE (1968-2023)

== Amenities ==
The town has an elementary school, a Catholic church, pharmacy, hairdresser, food shops, bakery, post office and a bar.

== Personalities ==
- Jeanne Cherhal, singer

== See also ==
Communes of the Loire-Atlantique department
