= La Grigonnais =

La Grigonnais La Gergonàe (Gallo) Kerrigon (Breton)
- Commune
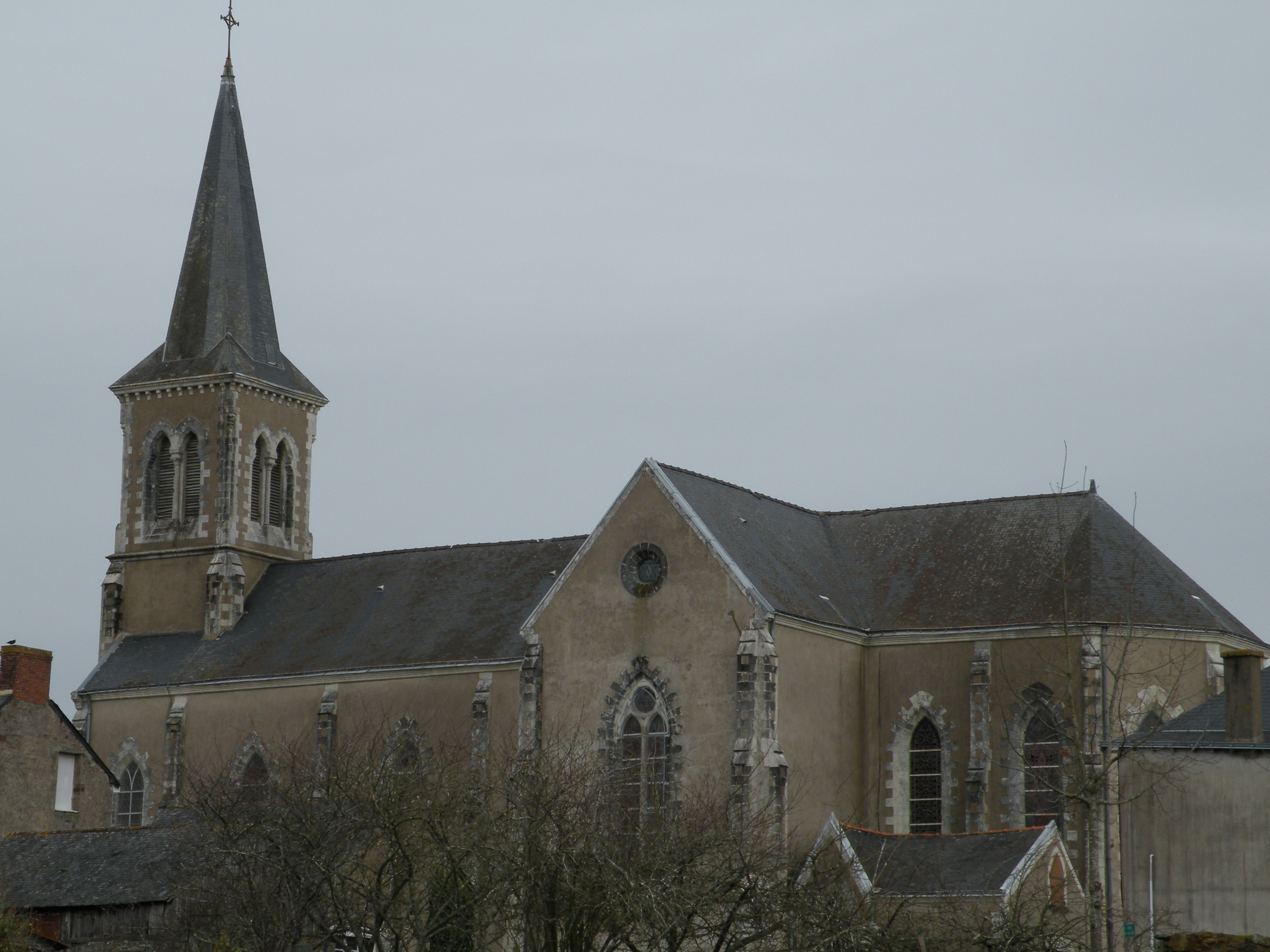
- Location of La Grigonnais
- Location within France Location within Pays de la Loire
- Coordinates: 47°31′38″N 1°39′58″W
- Country: France
- Region: Pays de la Loire
- Department: Loire-Atlantique
- Arrondissement: Châteaubriant-Ancenis
- Canton: Guémené-Penfao
- Intercommunality: CC de Nozay

Government
  - Mayor (2020–2026): Gwénaël Crahès
- Area^{1}: 21.22 km^{2} (8.19 sq mi)
- Highest elevation: 82 m (269 ft)
- Lowest elevation: 20 m (66 ft)
- Population (2023): 1,828
  - Density: 86.15/km^{2} (223.1/sq mi)
- Time zone: UTC+01:00 (CET)
  - Summer (DST): UTC+02:00 (CEST)
- INSEE/Postal code: 44224 /44170
- ^{1} French Land Register data, which excludes lakes, ponds, glaciers > 1 km^{2} (0.386 sq mi or 247 acres) and river estuaries.

La Grigonnais (French pronunciation: [la ɡʁiɡɔnɛ]; Gallo: La Gergonàe, Breton: Kerrigon) is a commune in the Loire-Atlantique department in western France.

== Population ==
Historical population
| Year | Pop. | ±% p.a. |
|---|---|---|
| 1968 | 780 | — |
| 1975 | 806 | +0.47% |
| 1982 | 931 | +2.08% |
| 1990 | 1,016 | +1.10% |
| 1999 | 1,101 | +0.90% |
| 2007 | 1,401 | +3.06% |
| 2012 | 1,587 | +2.52% |
| 2017 | 1,675 | +1.09% |
| 2023 | 1,828 | +1.47% |
Source: INSEE

== See also ==
- Communes of the Loire-Atlantique department
