= Casson, Loire-Atlantique =

Casson Caczon (Gallo) Kazon (Breton)
- Commune
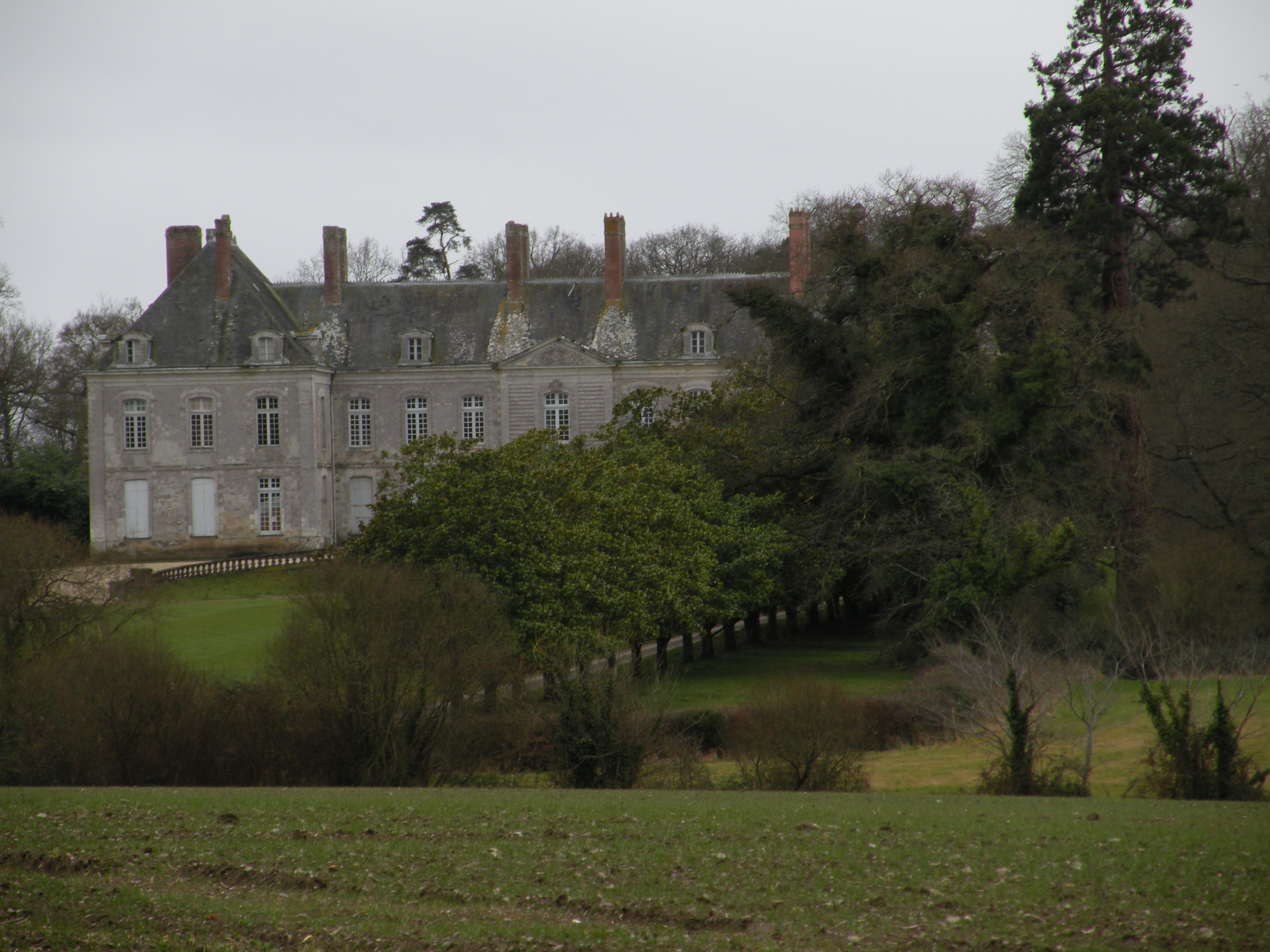
- Château du Plessis

- Coat of arms
- Location of Casson
- Location within France Location within Pays de la Loire
- Coordinates: 47°23′12″N 1°33′30″W
- Country: France
- Region: Pays de la Loire
- Department: Loire-Atlantique
- Arrondissement: Châteaubriant-Ancenis
- Canton: Nort-sur-Erdre
- Intercommunality: Erdre et Gesvres

Government
  - Mayor (2020–2026): Philippe Euzénat
- Area^{1}: 16.15 km^{2} (6.24 sq mi)
- Highest elevation: 46 m (151 ft)
- Lowest elevation: 3 m (9.8 ft)
- Population (2023): 2,605
  - Density: 161.3/km^{2} (417.8/sq mi)
- Time zone: UTC+01:00 (CET)
  - Summer (DST): UTC+02:00 (CEST)
- INSEE/Postal code: 44027 /44390
- ^{1} French Land Register data, which excludes lakes, ponds, glaciers > 1 km^{2} (0.386 sq mi or 247 acres) and river estuaries.

Casson (French pronunciation: [kasɔ̃]; Gallo: Caczon, Breton: Kazon) is a commune in the Loire-Atlantique department in western France.

== Population ==
Historical population

Year	Pop.	±% p.a.
1793	862	—
1821	869	+0.03%
1846	991	+0.53%
1872	1,163	+0.62%
1901	1,144	−0.06%
1926	887	−1.01%
1946	719	−1.04%
1962	690	−0.26%
1968	647	−1.07%

Year	Pop.	±% p.a.
1975	608	−0.88%
1982	974	+6.96%
1990	1,202	+2.66%
1999	1,320	+1.05%
2007	2,024	+5.49%
2012	2,101	+0.75%
2017	2,303	+1.85%
2023	2,605	+2.07%

Source: EHESS and INSEE (1968-2023)

== See also ==
- Communes of the Loire-Atlantique department
