= Saint-Mars-du-Désert, Loire-Atlantique =

Saint-Mars-du-Désert
- Commune
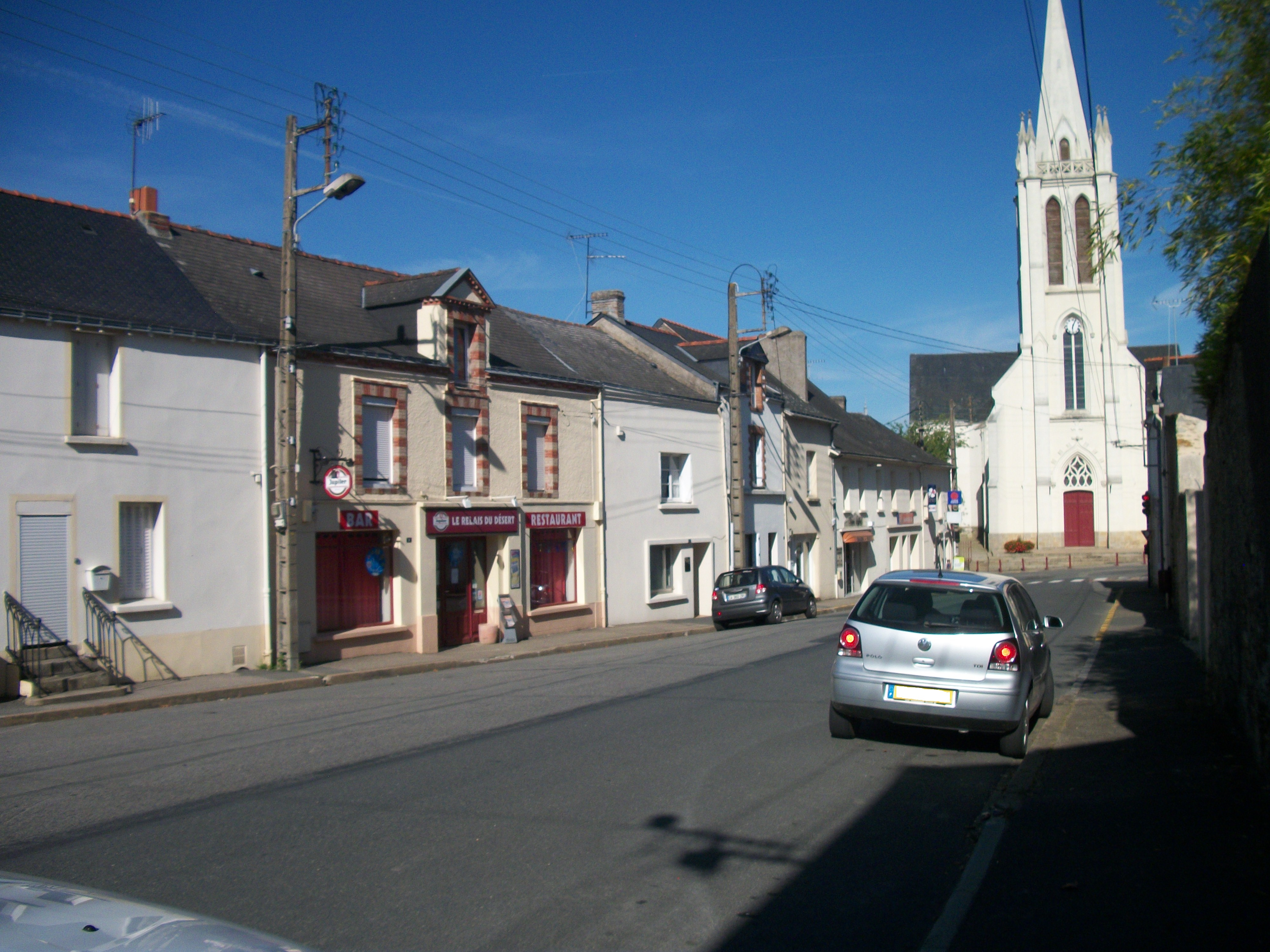
- The Julienne David Road, with the church of Saint-Médard in the background

- Coat of arms
- Location of Saint-Mars-du-Désert
- Location within France Location within Pays de la Loire
- Coordinates: 47°22′02″N 1°24′16″W
- Country: France
- Region: Pays de la Loire
- Department: Loire-Atlantique
- Arrondissement: Châteaubriant-Ancenis
- Canton: Nort-sur-Erdre
- Intercommunality: Erdre et Gesvres

Government
  - Mayor (2020–2026): Barbara Nourry
- Area^{1}: 30.46 km^{2} (11.76 sq mi)
- Elevation: 67 m (220 ft)
- Highest elevation: 77 m (253 ft)
- Lowest elevation: 3 m (9.8 ft)
- Population (2023): 5,523
  - Density: 181.3/km^{2} (469.6/sq mi)
- Time zone: UTC+01:00 (CET)
  - Summer (DST): UTC+02:00 (CEST)
- INSEE/Postal code: 44179 /44850
- ^{1} French Land Register data, which excludes lakes, ponds, glaciers > 1 km^{2} (0.386 sq mi or 247 acres) and river estuaries.

Saint-Mars-du-Désert (French pronunciation: [sɛ̃ maʁ dy dezɛʁ]; Breton: Sant-Marzh-an-Dezerzh) is a commune in the Loire-Atlantique department in western France.

== Population ==
Historical population
Year	Pop.	±% p.a.
1968	1,716	—
1975	2,033	+2.45%
1982	2,831	+4.84%
1990	3,127	+1.25%
1999	3,405	+0.95%
2007	3,996	+2.02%
2012	4,221	+1.10%
2017	4,899	+3.02%
2023	5,523	+2.02%
Source: INSEE

== See also ==
- Communes of the Loire-Atlantique department
