= Petit-Mars =

- Commune
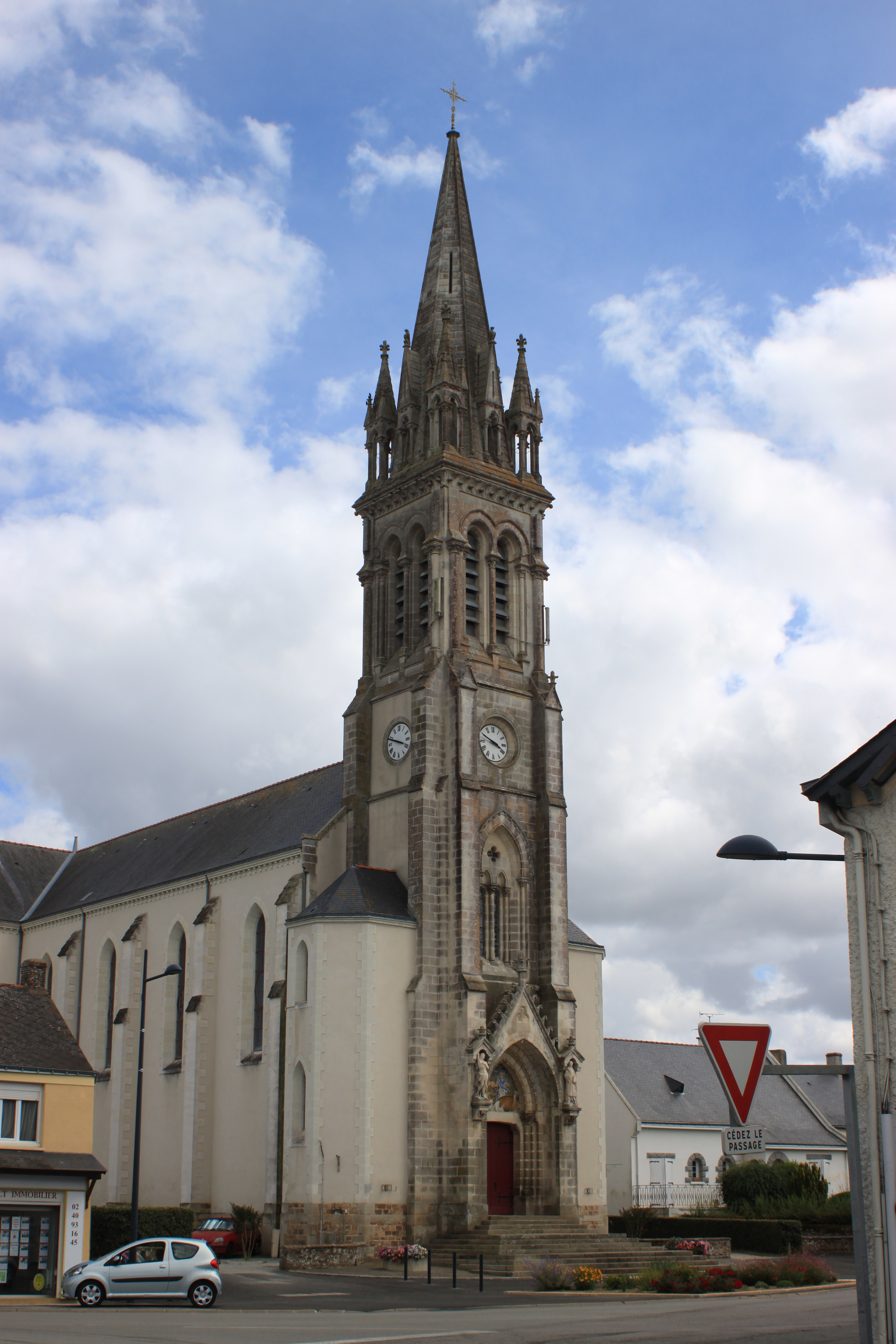

- Coat of arms
- Location of Petit-Mars
- Location within France Location within Pays de la Loire
- Coordinates: 47°23′42″N 1°27′14″W
- Country: France
- Region: Pays de la Loire
- Department: Loire-Atlantique
- Arrondissement: Châteaubriant-Ancenis
- Canton: Nort-sur-Erdre
- Intercommunality: Erdre et Gesvres

Government
  - Mayor (2020–2026): Jean-Luc Besnier
- Area^{1}: 25.97 km^{2} (10.03 sq mi)
- Highest elevation: 43 m (141 ft)
- Lowest elevation: 2 m (6.6 ft)
- Population (2023): 3,888
  - Density: 149.7/km^{2} (387.8/sq mi)
- Time zone: UTC+01:00 (CET)
  - Summer (DST): UTC+02:00 (CEST)
- INSEE/Postal code: 44122 /44390
- ^{1} French Land Register data, which excludes lakes, ponds, glaciers > 1 km^{2} (0.386 sq mi or 247 acres) and river estuaries.

Petit-Mars (Breton: Meurzh bihan) is a commune in the Loire-Atlantique department in western France.

== Population ==
Historical population

Year	Pop.	±% p.a.
1793	1,247	—
1821	1,197	−0.15%
1846	1,400	+0.63%
1872	1,382	−0.05%
1901	1,392	+0.02%
1926	1,104	−0.92%
1946	1,013	−0.43%
1962	1,062	+0.30%
1968	1,086	+0.37%

Year	Pop.	±% p.a.
1975	1,204	+1.48%
1982	1,800	+5.91%
1990	2,309	+3.16%
1999	2,438	+0.61%
2007	3,388	+4.20%
2012	3,520	+0.77%
2017	3,601	+0.46%
2023	3,888	+1.29%

Source: EHESS and INSEE (1968-2023)

== See also ==
- Communes of the Loire-Atlantique department
