= Puceul =

Puceul Puñsel
- Commune
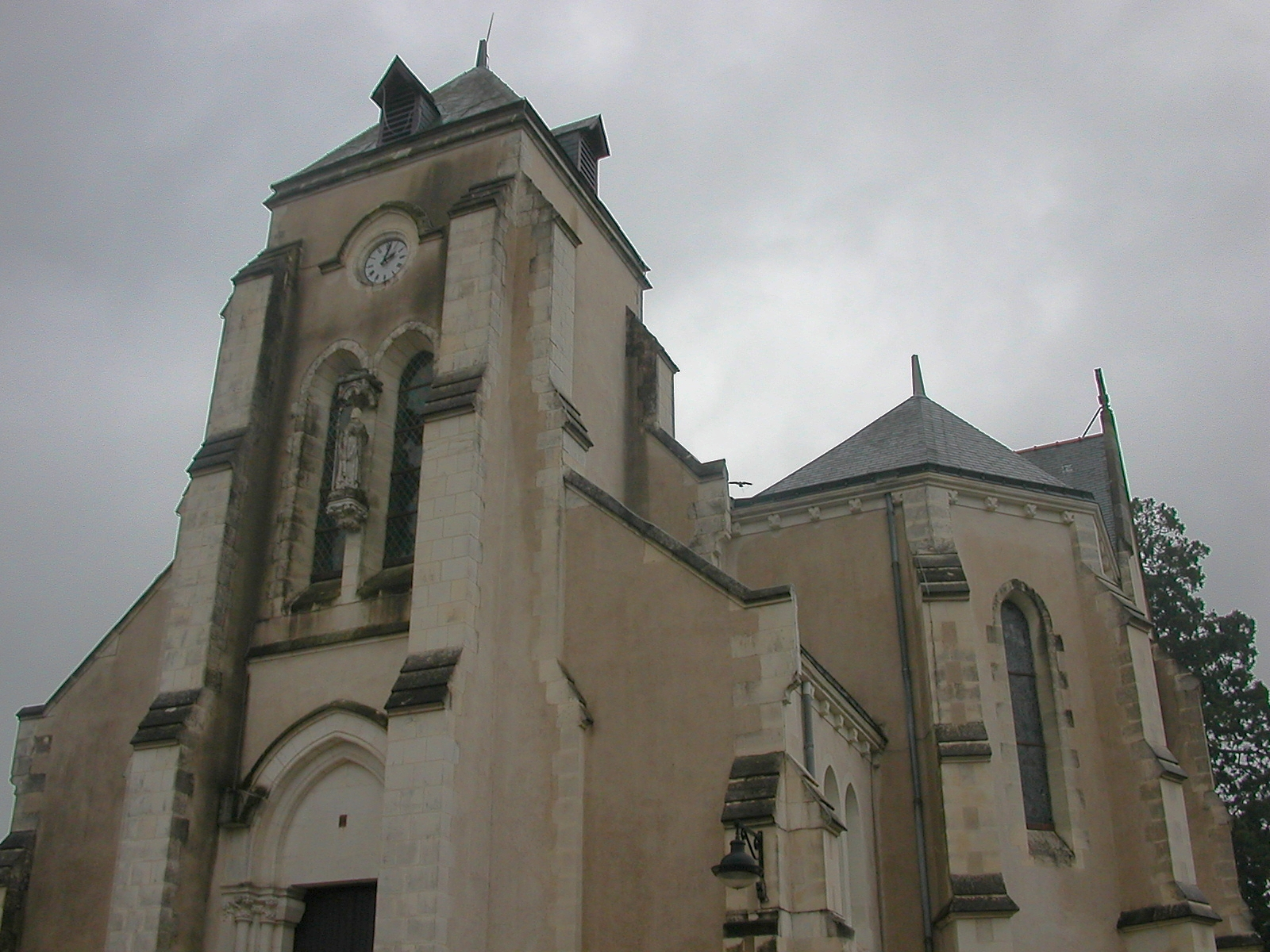

- Coat of arms
- Location of Puceul
- Location within France Location within Pays de la Loire
- Coordinates: 47°31′22″N 1°36′56″W
- Country: France
- Region: Pays de la Loire
- Department: Loire-Atlantique
- Arrondissement: Châteaubriant-Ancenis
- Canton: Guémené-Penfao
- Intercommunality: CC de Nozay

Government
  - Mayor (2020–2026): Claire Theveniau
- Area^{1}: 20.09 km^{2} (7.76 sq mi)
- Highest elevation: 82 m (269 ft)
- Lowest elevation: 26 m (85 ft)
- Population (2023): 1,142
  - Density: 56.84/km^{2} (147.2/sq mi)
- Time zone: UTC+01:00 (CET)
  - Summer (DST): UTC+02:00 (CEST)
- INSEE/Postal code: 44138 /44390
- ^{1} French Land Register data, which excludes lakes, ponds, glaciers > 1 km^{2} (0.386 sq mi or 247 acres) and river estuaries.

Puceul (French pronunciation: [pysœl]; Breton: Puñsel) is a commune in the Loire-Atlantique department in western France.

== Population ==
Historical population
Year	Pop.	±% p.a.
1968	685	—
1975	609	−1.67%
1982	580	−0.69%
1990	599	+0.40%
1999	630	+0.56%
2007	915	+4.78%
2012	1,026	+2.32%
2017	1,128	+1.91%
2023	1,142	+0.21%
Source: INSEE

== See also ==
- Communes of the Loire-Atlantique department
