= Lusanger =

Lusanger Lusanjae (Gallo) Luzevieg (Breton)
- Commune
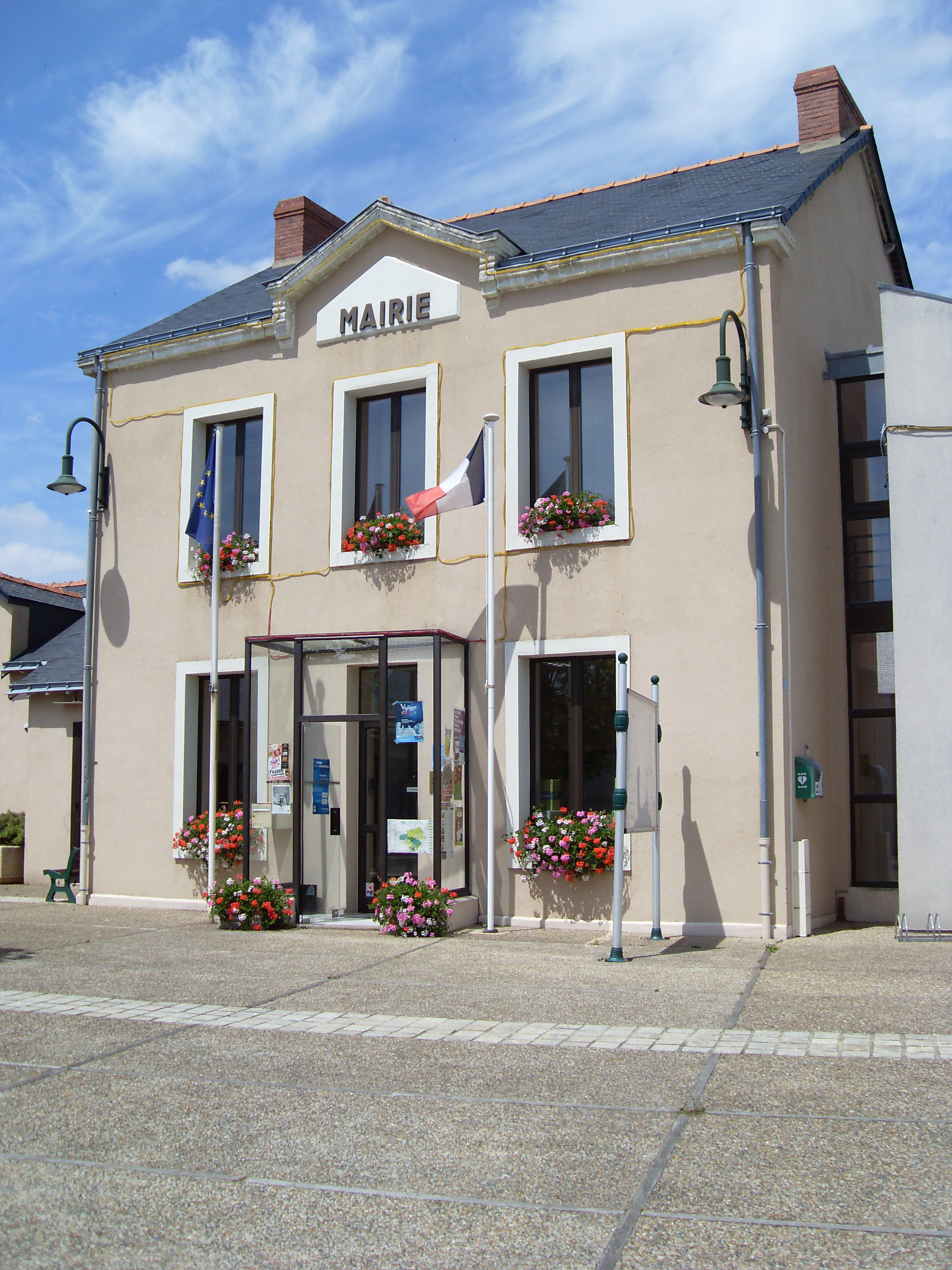
- Town hall

- Coat of arms
- Location of Lusanger
- Location within France Location within Pays de la Loire
- Coordinates: 47°40′55″N 1°35′14″W
- Country: France
- Region: Pays de la Loire
- Department: Loire-Atlantique
- Arrondissement: Châteaubriant-Ancenis
- Canton: Guémené-Penfao
- Intercommunality: Châteaubriant-Derval

Government
  - Mayor (2020–2026): Yves Fromentin
- Area^{1}: 35.38 km^{2} (13.66 sq mi)
- Highest elevation: 72 m (236 ft)
- Lowest elevation: 21 m (69 ft)
- Population (2023): 1,074
  - Density: 30.36/km^{2} (78.62/sq mi)
- Time zone: UTC+01:00 (CET)
  - Summer (DST): UTC+02:00 (CEST)
- INSEE/Postal code: 44086 /44590
- ^{1} French Land Register data, which excludes lakes, ponds, glaciers > 1 km^{2} (0.386 sq mi or 247 acres) and river estuaries.

Lusanger (French pronunciation: [lyzɑ̃ʒe]; Gallo: Lusanjae, Breton: Luzevieg) is a commune in the Loire-Atlantique department in western France.

== Population ==
Historical population
Year	Pop.	±% p.a.
1968	1,020	—
1975	934	−1.25%
1982	914	−0.31%
1990	926	+0.16%
1999	947	+0.25%
2007	1,007	+0.77%
2012	1,023	+0.32%
2017	1,047	+0.46%
2023	1,074	+0.43%
Source: INSEE

== See also ==
- Communes of the Loire-Atlantique department
