= Le Gâvre =

Le Gâvre Le Gavr (Gallo) Ar C’havr (Breton)
- Commune
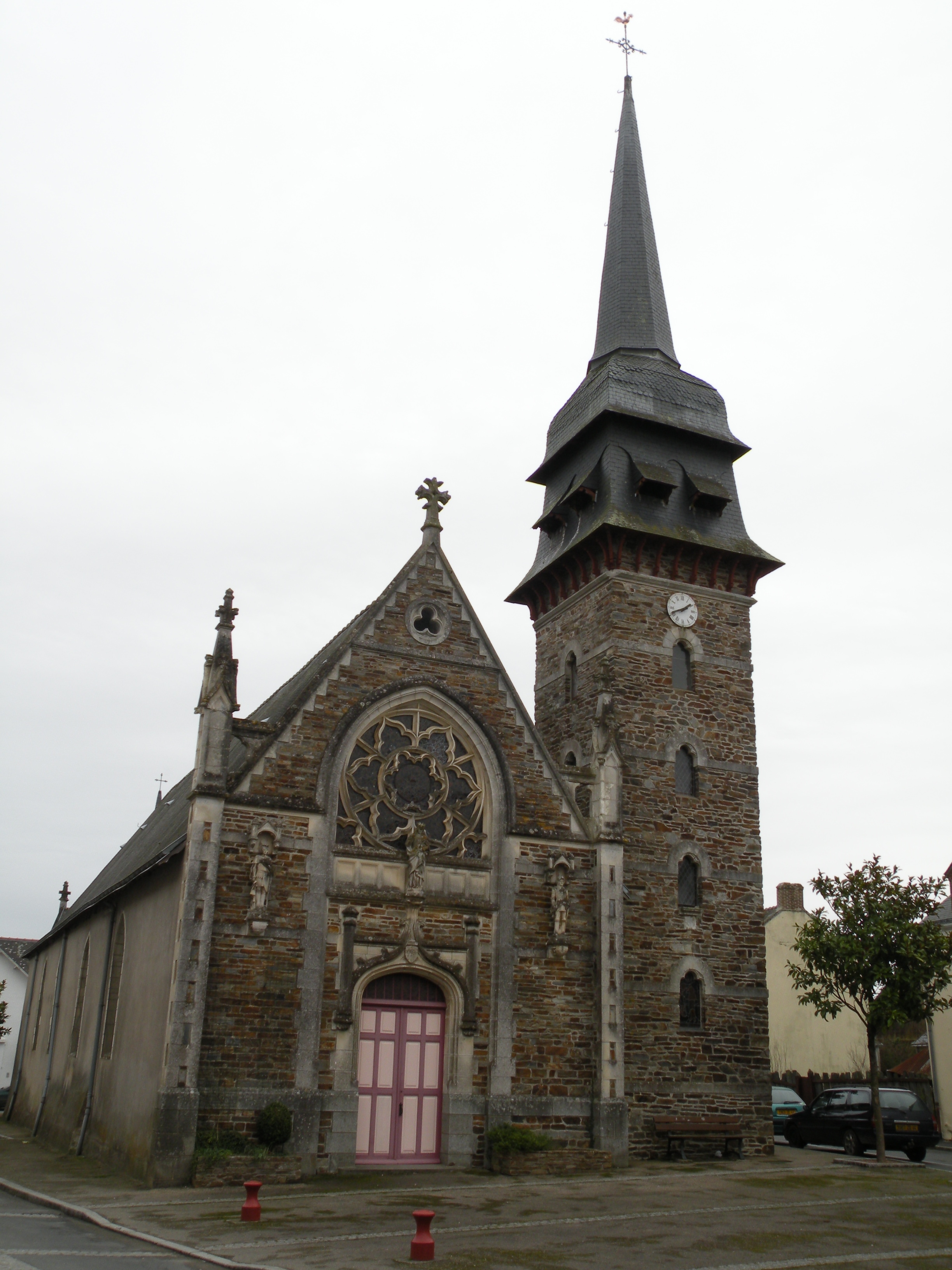

- Coat of arms
- Location of Le Gâvre
- Location within France Location within Pays de la Loire
- Coordinates: 47°31′17″N 1°44′51″W
- Country: France
- Region: Pays de la Loire
- Department: Loire-Atlantique
- Arrondissement: Châteaubriant-Ancenis
- Canton: Blain
- Intercommunality: CC Pays de Blain

Government
  - Mayor (2020–2026): Nicolas Oudaert
- Area^{1}: 53.58 km^{2} (20.69 sq mi)
- Highest elevation: 62 m (203 ft)
- Lowest elevation: 22 m (72 ft)
- Population (2023): 1,890
  - Density: 35.3/km^{2} (91.4/sq mi)
- Time zone: UTC+01:00 (CET)
  - Summer (DST): UTC+02:00 (CEST)
- INSEE/Postal code: 44062 /44130
- ^{1} French Land Register data, which excludes lakes, ponds, glaciers > 1 km^{2} (0.386 sq mi or 247 acres) and river estuaries.

Le Gâvre (French pronunciation: [lə ɡavʁ]; Gallo: Le Gavr, Breton: Ar C'havr) is a commune in the Loire-Atlantique department in western France.

== Population ==
Historical population
Year	Pop.	±% p.a.
1968	861	—
1975	825	−0.61%
1982	892	+1.12%
1990	995	+1.38%
1999	945	−0.57%
2007	1,316	+4.23%
2012	1,677	+4.97%
2017	1,796	+1.38%
2023	1,890	+0.85%
Source: INSEE

== See also ==
- Communes of the Loire-Atlantique department
