= Fercé =

Fercé Fèrczaé (Gallo) Ferreg (Breton)
- Commune
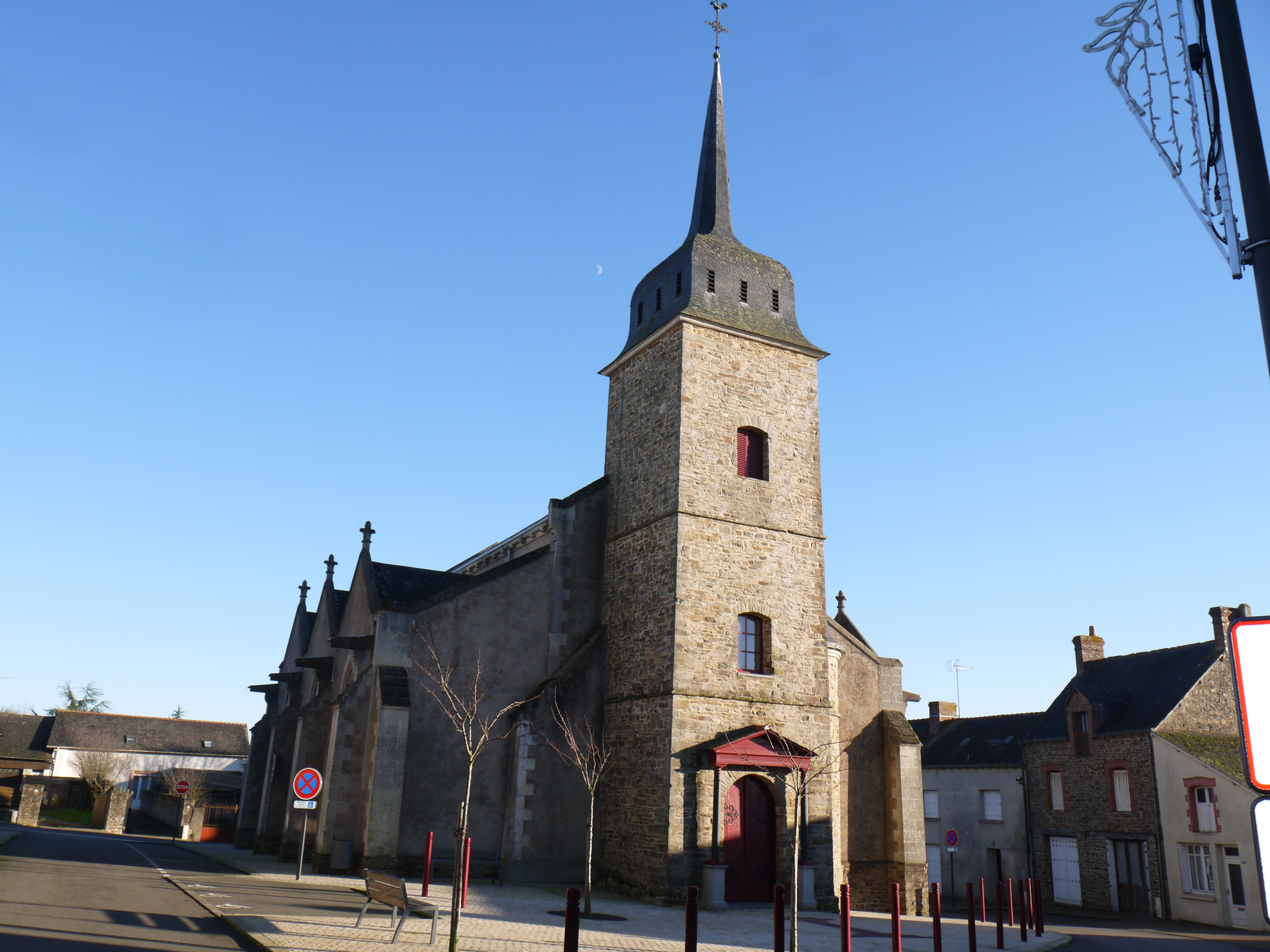

- Coat of arms
- Location of Fercé
- Location within France Location within Pays de la Loire
- Coordinates: 47°47′49″N 1°24′51″W
- Country: France
- Region: Pays de la Loire
- Department: Loire-Atlantique
- Arrondissement: Châteaubriant-Ancenis
- Canton: Châteaubriant
- Intercommunality: Châteaubriant-Derval

Government
  - Mayor (2020–2026): Alain Le Tolguenec
- Area^{1}: 22.04 km^{2} (8.51 sq mi)
- Highest elevation: 117 m (384 ft)
- Lowest elevation: 42 m (138 ft)
- Population (2023): 517
  - Density: 23.5/km^{2} (60.8/sq mi)
- Time zone: UTC+01:00 (CET)
  - Summer (DST): UTC+02:00 (CEST)
- INSEE/Postal code: 44058 /44660
- ^{1} French Land Register data, which excludes lakes, ponds, glaciers > 1 km^{2} (0.386 sq mi or 247 acres) and river estuaries.

Fercé (French pronunciation: [fɛʁse]; Gallo: Fèrczaé, Breton: Ferreg) is a commune in the Loire-Atlantique department in western France.

== Geography ==
The Semnon forms part of the commune's northern border; the Brutz, a tributary of the Semnon, forms all of its southern border. Fercé is also located near to La Bretèche, the highest point in the Loire-Atlantique at 116 metres, the lowest highpoint of all departments, and lower than the lowest points of 29 departments.

== Population ==
Historical population
Year	Pop.	±% p.a.
1968	545	—
1975	501	−1.20%
1982	459	−1.24%
1990	499	+1.05%
1999	517	+0.39%
2007	481	−0.90%
2012	501	+0.82%
2017	474	−1.10%
2023	517	+1.46%
Source: INSEE

== Climate ==
Month	J	F	M	A	M	J	J	A	S	O	N	D
Maximum temperature (°C)	8.1	9.4	12.3	14.7	18.4	21.5	23.8	23.6	21.1	16.7	11.7	9.0
Minimum temperature (°C)	2.2	2.5	4.0	5.4	8.5	11.2	13.1	13.1	11.2	8.3	4.9	3.2
Average Temperatures (°C)	5.2	5.9	8.2	10.1	13.4	16.4	18.5	18.3	16.2	12.5	8.3	6.1
Precipitation (Highest average in mm)	61.3	52.3	49.3	45.1	58.1	46.4	42.6	47.3	56.6	63.8	68.4	69.1
Source: Météo France and Lameteo.org

== See also ==
- Communes of the Loire-Atlantique department
