= Villepot =

Villepot Kerbod (Breton)
- Commune
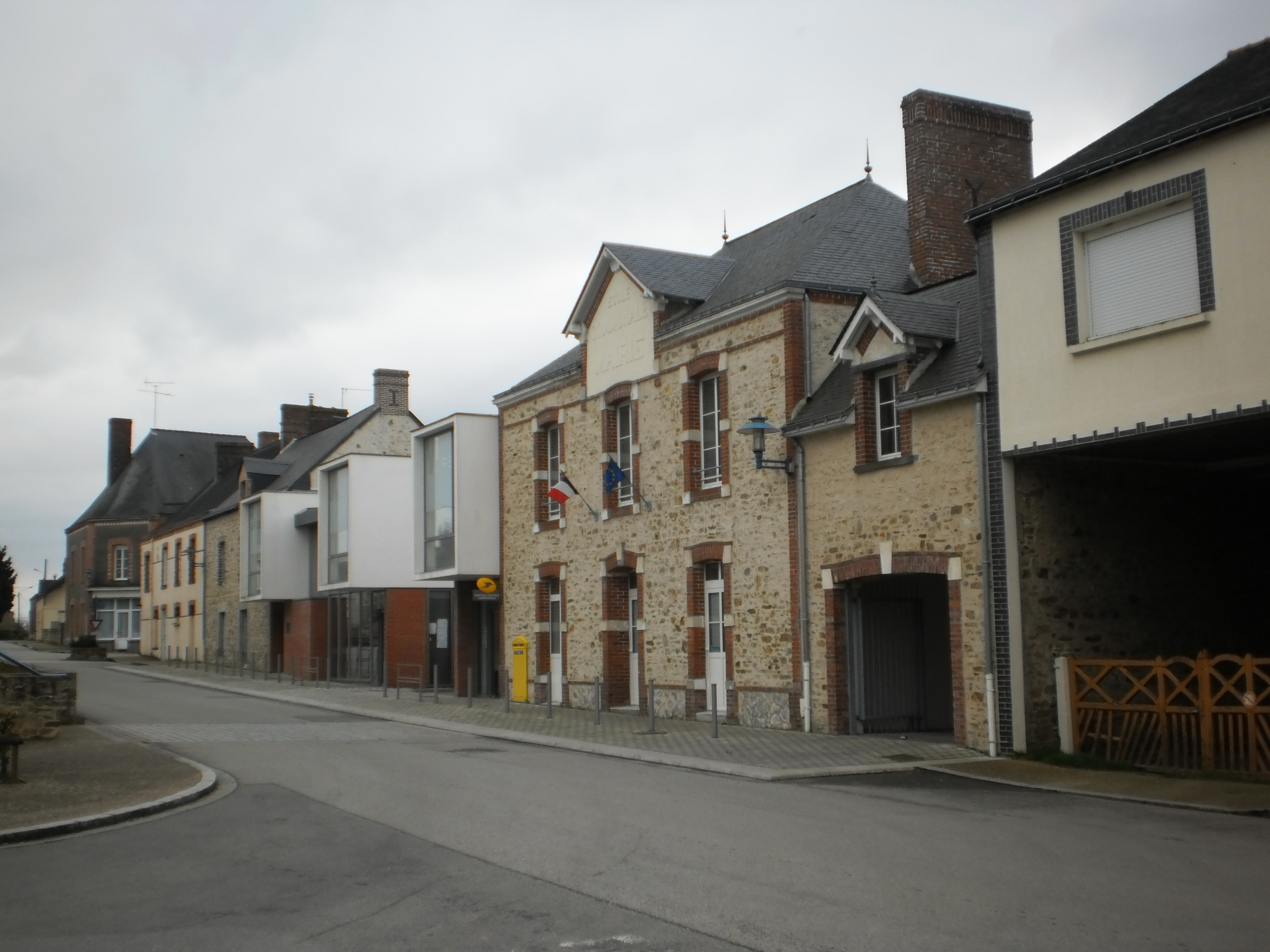
- The town hall in Villepot

- Coat of arms
- Location of Villepot
- Location within France Location within Pays de la Loire
- Coordinates: 47°46′34″N 1°16′35″W
- Country: France
- Region: Pays de la Loire
- Department: Loire-Atlantique
- Arrondissement: Châteaubriant-Ancenis
- Canton: Châteaubriant
- Intercommunality: Châteaubriant-Derval

Government
  - Mayor (2020–2026): Philippe Dugravot
- Area^{1}: 20.59 km^{2} (7.95 sq mi)
- Highest elevation: 116 m (381 ft)
- Lowest elevation: 66 m (217 ft)
- Population (2023): 680
  - Density: 33/km^{2} (86/sq mi)
- Demonym(s): Villepotaises, Villepotais
- Time zone: UTC+01:00 (CET)
  - Summer (DST): UTC+02:00 (CEST)
- INSEE/Postal code: 44218 /44110
- Website: http://www.cc-castelbriantais.fr/
- ^{1} French Land Register data, which excludes lakes, ponds, glaciers > 1 km^{2} (0.386 sq mi or 247 acres) and river estuaries.

Villepot (French pronunciation: [vilpo]; Breton: Kerbod) is a commune in the Loire-Atlantique department in western France.

== Geography ==
The river Verzée flows eastward through the southern part of the commune.

== See also ==
- Communes of the Loire-Atlantique department
- The works of Jean Fréour Works in the Notre Dame de l’Assomption church in Villepot.
