= Canton of Guémené-Penfao =

Coordinates: 47.63°N 1.83°W

The canton of Guémené-Penfao is an administrative division of the Loire-Atlantique department, western France. Its borders were modified at the French canton reorganisation which came into effect in March 2015. Its seat is in Guémené-Penfao.

It consists of the following communes:

1. Abbaretz
2. La Chevallerais
3. Conquereuil
4. Derval
5. La Grigonnais
6. Guémené-Penfao
7. Jans
8. Lusanger
9. Marsac-sur-Don
10. Massérac
11. Mouais
12. Nozay
13. Pierric
14. Puceul
15. Saffré
16. Saint-Vincent-des-Landes
17. Sion-les-Mines
18. Treffieux
19. Vay
