= Saint-Vincent-des-Landes =

- Commune
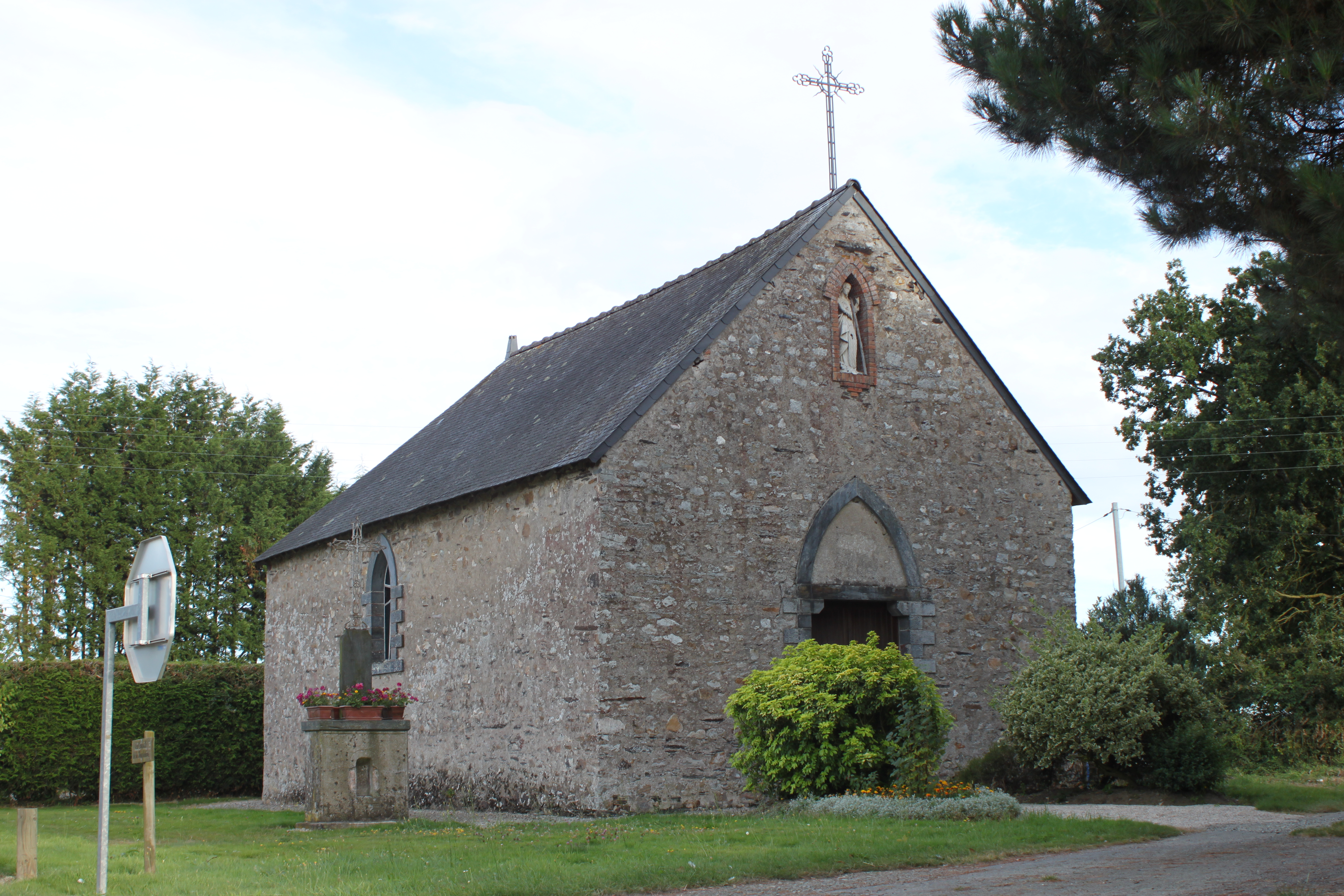
- The chapel of the Magdalene

- Coat of arms
- Location of Saint-Vincent-des-Landes
- Location within France Location within Pays de la Loire
- Coordinates: 47°39′23″N 1°29′44″W
- Country: France
- Region: Pays de la Loire
- Department: Loire-Atlantique
- Arrondissement: Châteaubriant-Ancenis
- Canton: Guémené-Penfao
- Intercommunality: Châteaubriant-Derval

Government
  - Mayor (2020–2026): Alain Rabu
- Area^{1}: 33.7 km^{2} (13.0 sq mi)
- Elevation: 55 m (180 ft)
- Highest elevation: 77 m (253 ft)
- Lowest elevation: 25 m (82 ft)
- Population (2023): 1,525
  - Density: 45.3/km^{2} (117/sq mi)
- Time zone: UTC+01:00 (CET)
  - Summer (DST): UTC+02:00 (CEST)
- INSEE/Postal code: 44193 /44590
- ^{1} French Land Register data, which excludes lakes, ponds, glaciers > 1 km^{2} (0.386 sq mi or 247 acres) and river estuaries.

Saint-Vincent-des-Landes (French pronunciation: [sɛ̃ vɛ̃sɑ̃ de lɑ̃d]; Breton: Sant-Visant-al-Lann) is a commune in the Loire-Atlantique department in western France.

== See also ==
- Communes of the Loire-Atlantique department
