= Noyal-sur-Brutz =

- Commune
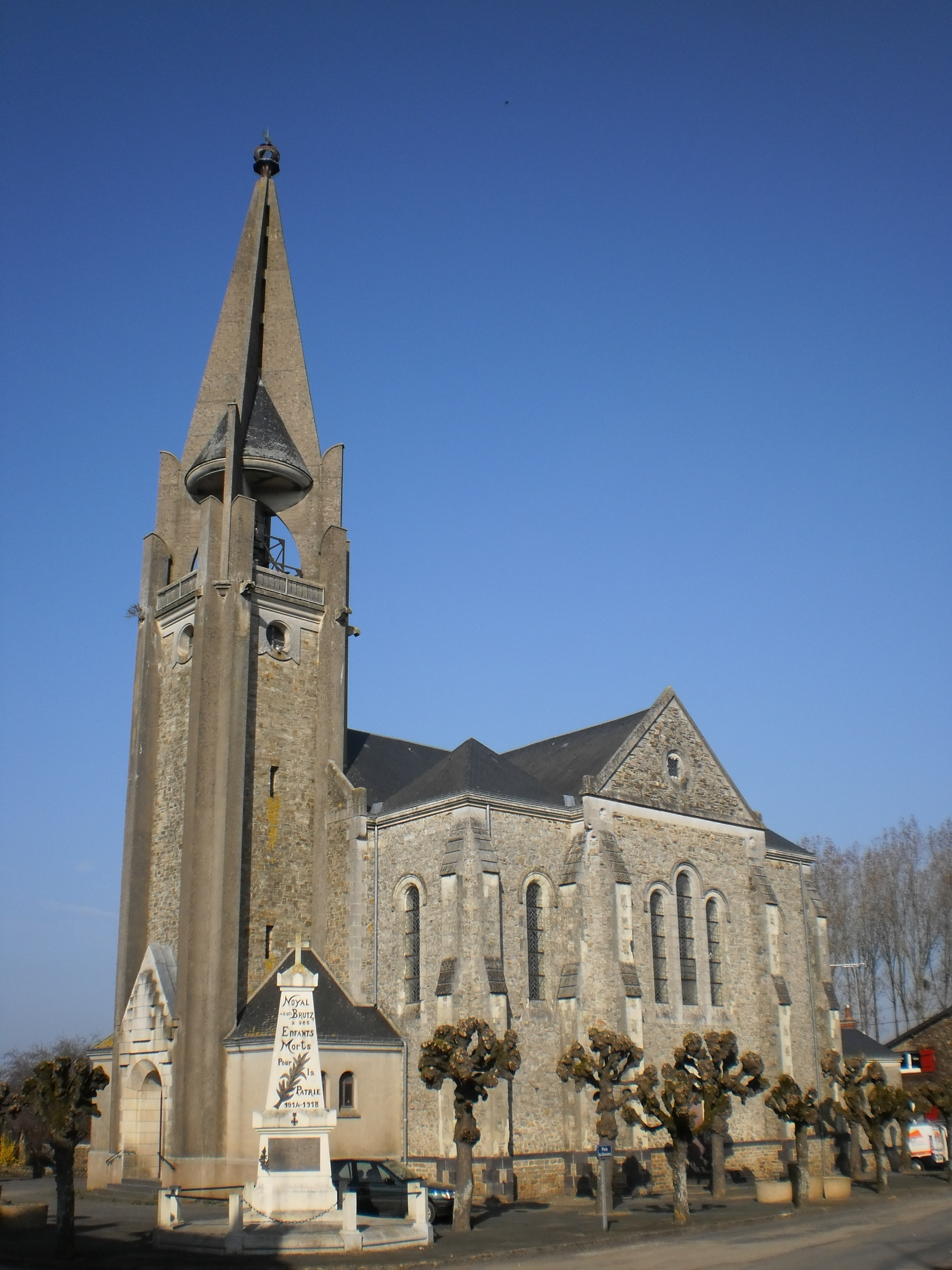

- Coat of arms
- Location of Noyal-sur-Brutz
- Location within France Location within Pays de la Loire
- Coordinates: 47°46′37″N 1°20′44″W
- Country: France
- Region: Pays de la Loire
- Department: Loire-Atlantique
- Arrondissement: Châteaubriant-Ancenis
- Canton: Châteaubriant
- Intercommunality: Châteaubriant-Derval

Government
  - Mayor (2020–2026): Edith Marguin
- Area^{1}: 7.71 km^{2} (2.98 sq mi)
- Highest elevation: 112 m (367 ft)
- Lowest elevation: 64 m (210 ft)
- Population (2023): 575
  - Density: 74.6/km^{2} (193/sq mi)
- Time zone: UTC+01:00 (CET)
  - Summer (DST): UTC+02:00 (CEST)
- INSEE/Postal code: 44112 /44110
- ^{1} French Land Register data, which excludes lakes, ponds, glaciers > 1 km^{2} (0.386 sq mi or 247 acres) and river estuaries.

Noyal-sur-Brutz (French pronunciation: [nwajal syʁ bʁy]; Breton: Noal-ar-Bruz) is a commune in the Loire-Atlantique department in western France.

== Geography ==
The village lies above the left bank of the river Brutz (a tributary of the Semnon), which flows west through the northern part of the commune.

The river Verzée forms part of the commune's southern border.

== Population ==
Historical population
Year	Pop.	±% p.a.
1968	385	—
1975	376	−0.34%
1982	422	+1.66%
1990	443	+0.61%
1999	481	+0.92%
2007	544	+1.55%
2012	585	+1.46%
2017	592	+0.24%
2023	575	−0.48%
Source: INSEE

== See also ==
- Communes of the Loire-Atlantique department
