= Fégréac =

Fégréac Fégéréac (Gallo) Fegerieg (Breton)
- Commune
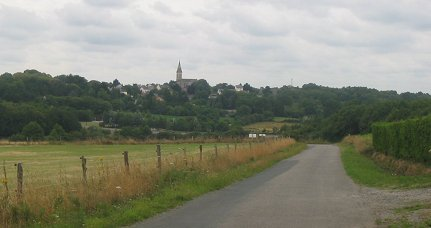

- Coat of arms
- Location of Fégréac
- Location within France Location within Pays de la Loire
- Coordinates: 47°35′08″N 2°02′36″W
- Country: France
- Region: Pays de la Loire
- Department: Loire-Atlantique
- Arrondissement: Châteaubriant-Ancenis
- Canton: Pontchâteau
- Intercommunality: Redon Agglomération

Government
  - Mayor (2020–2026): Jérome Ricordel
- Area^{1}: 44.18 km^{2} (17.06 sq mi)
- Highest elevation: 62 m (203 ft)
- Lowest elevation: 0 m (0 ft)
- Population (2023): 2,243
  - Density: 50.77/km^{2} (131.5/sq mi)
- Time zone: UTC+01:00 (CET)
  - Summer (DST): UTC+02:00 (CEST)
- INSEE/Postal code: 44057 /44460
- ^{1} French Land Register data, which excludes lakes, ponds, glaciers > 1 km^{2} (0.386 sq mi or 247 acres) and river estuaries.

Fégréac (French pronunciation: [feɡʁeak]; Gallo: Fégéréac, Breton: Fegerieg) is a commune in the Loire-Atlantique department in western France.

== Population ==
Historical population

Year	Pop.	±% p.a.
1793	1,791	—
1821	1,831	+0.08%
1846	2,430	+1.14%
1872	2,871	+0.64%
1901	2,918	+0.06%
1926	2,333	−0.89%
1946	2,002	−0.76%
1962	1,890	−0.36%
1968	1,835	−0.49%

Year	Pop.	±% p.a.
1975	1,714	−0.97%
1982	1,752	+0.31%
1990	1,874	+0.85%
1999	1,992	+0.68%
2007	2,132	+0.85%
2012	2,317	+1.68%
2017	2,445	+1.08%
2023	2,243	−1.43%

Source: EHESS and INSEE (1968-2023)

== See also ==
- Communes of the Loire-Atlantique department
