= Grand-Auverné =

Grand-Auverné Graund-Auvernaé (Gallo) Anwerneg-Veur (Breton)
- Commune
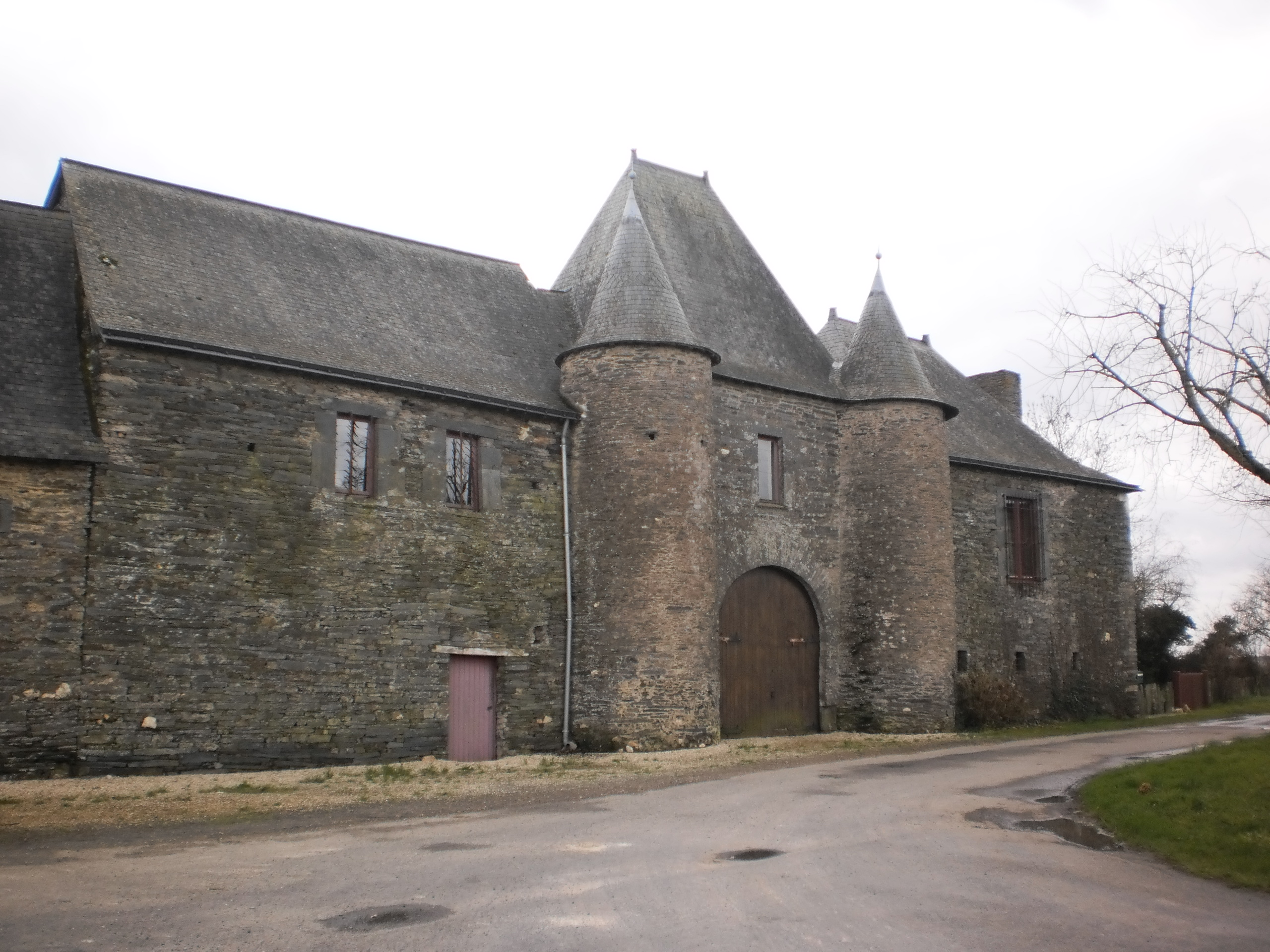
- Manor of Petite-Haie

- Coat of arms
- Location of Grand-Auverné
- Location within France Location within Pays de la Loire
- Coordinates: 47°35′32″N 1°19′44″W
- Country: France
- Region: Pays de la Loire
- Department: Loire-Atlantique
- Arrondissement: Châteaubriant-Ancenis
- Canton: Châteaubriant
- Intercommunality: Châteaubriant-Derval

Government
  - Mayor (2020–2026): Sébastien Crossouard
- Area^{1}: 34.4 km^{2} (13.3 sq mi)
- Highest elevation: 88 m (289 ft)
- Lowest elevation: 37 m (121 ft)
- Population (2023): 774
  - Density: 22.5/km^{2} (58.3/sq mi)
- Time zone: UTC+01:00 (CET)
  - Summer (DST): UTC+02:00 (CEST)
- INSEE/Postal code: 44065 /44520
- ^{1} French Land Register data, which excludes lakes, ponds, glaciers > 1 km^{2} (0.386 sq mi or 247 acres) and river estuaries.

Grand-Auverné (French pronunciation: [ɡʁɑ̃.t‿ovɛʁne]; Gallo: Graund-Auvernaé, Breton: Arwerneg-Veur) is a commune in the Loire-Atlantique department in western France.

== Population ==
Historical population
Year	Pop.	±% p.a.
1968	1,051	—
1975	905	−2.11%
1982	877	−0.45%
1990	754	−1.87%
1999	684	−1.08%
2007	735	+0.90%
2012	823	+2.29%
2017	768	−1.37%
2023	774	+0.13%
Source: INSEE

== See also ==
- Communes of the Loire-Atlantique department
