= Avessac =

Avessac Aveczac (Gallo) Avezeg (Breton)
- Commune
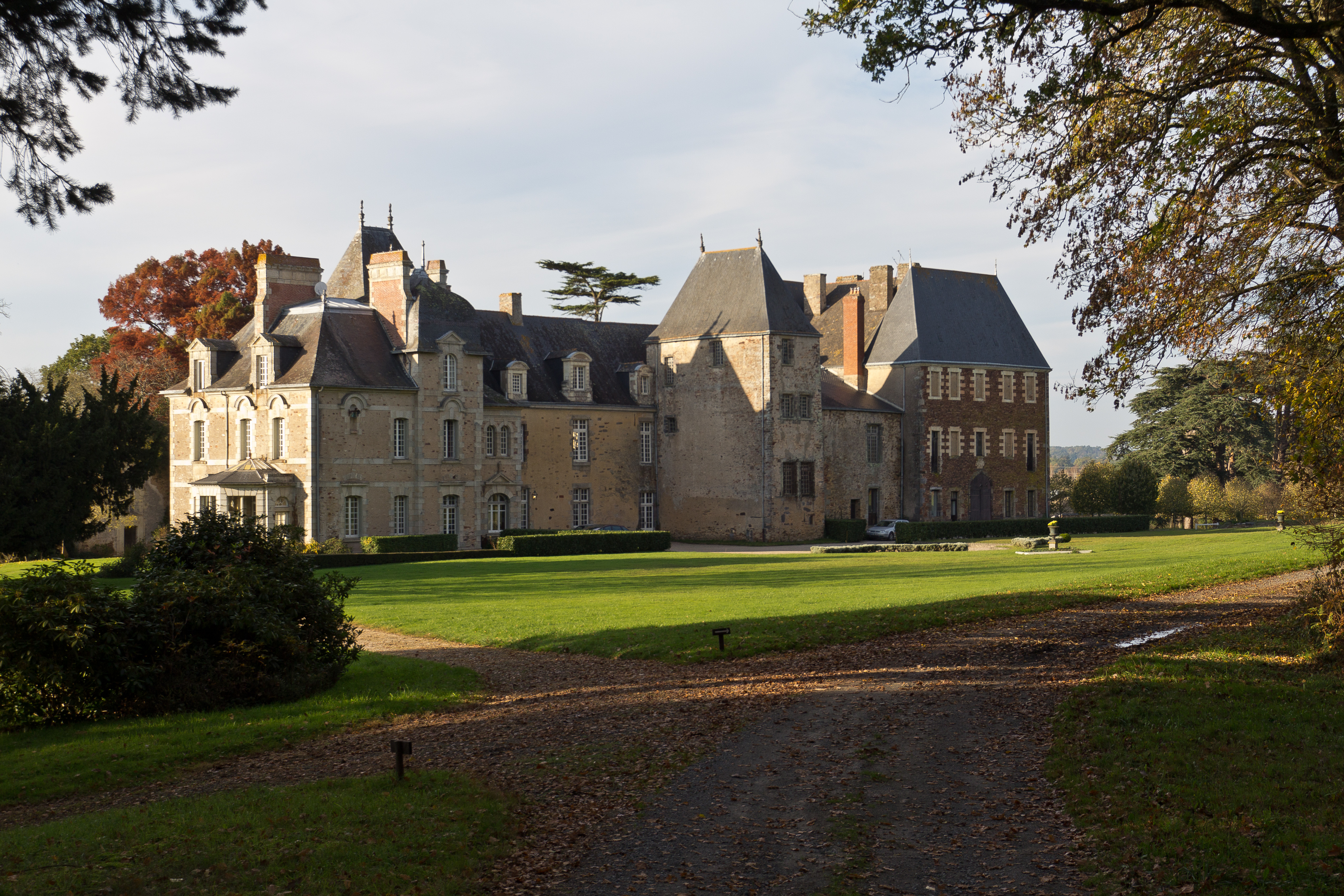
- Château de Pordor
- Location of Avessac
- Location within France Location within Pays de la Loire
- Coordinates: 47°39′15″N 1°59′18″W
- Country: France
- Region: Pays de la Loire
- Department: Loire-Atlantique
- Arrondissement: Châteaubriant-Ancenis
- Canton: Pontchâteau
- Intercommunality: Redon Agglomération

Government
  - Mayor (2020–2026): Hubert du Plessis
- Area^{1}: 76.49 km^{2} (29.53 sq mi)
- Elevation: 76 m (249 ft)
- Highest elevation: 81 m (266 ft)
- Lowest elevation: 0 m (0 ft)
- Population (2023): 2,452
  - Density: 32.06/km^{2} (83.03/sq mi)
- Time zone: UTC+01:00 (CET)
  - Summer (DST): UTC+02:00 (CEST)
- INSEE/Postal code: 44007 /44460
- ^{1} French Land Register data, which excludes lakes, ponds, glaciers > 1 km^{2} (0.386 sq mi or 247 acres) and river estuaries.

Avessac (French pronunciation: [avɛsak]; Gallo: Aveczac or Aveça, Breton: Avezeg) is a commune in the Loire-Atlantique department in western France.

== Population ==
Historical population

Year	Pop.	±% p.a.
1793	2,299	—
1821	2,084	−0.35%
1846	2,464	+0.67%
1872	3,427	+1.28%
1901	3,732	+0.29%
1926	3,137	−0.69%
1946	2,759	−0.64%
1962	2,496	−0.62%
1968	2,405	−0.62%

Year	Pop.	±% p.a.
1975	2,356	−0.29%
1982	2,395	+0.23%
1990	2,233	−0.87%
1999	2,154	−0.40%
2007	2,387	+1.29%
2012	2,494	+0.88%
2017	2,476	−0.14%
2023	2,452	−0.16%

Source: EHESS and INSEE (1968-2023)

== See also ==
- Communes of the Loire-Atlantique department
