= Soulvache =

- Commune
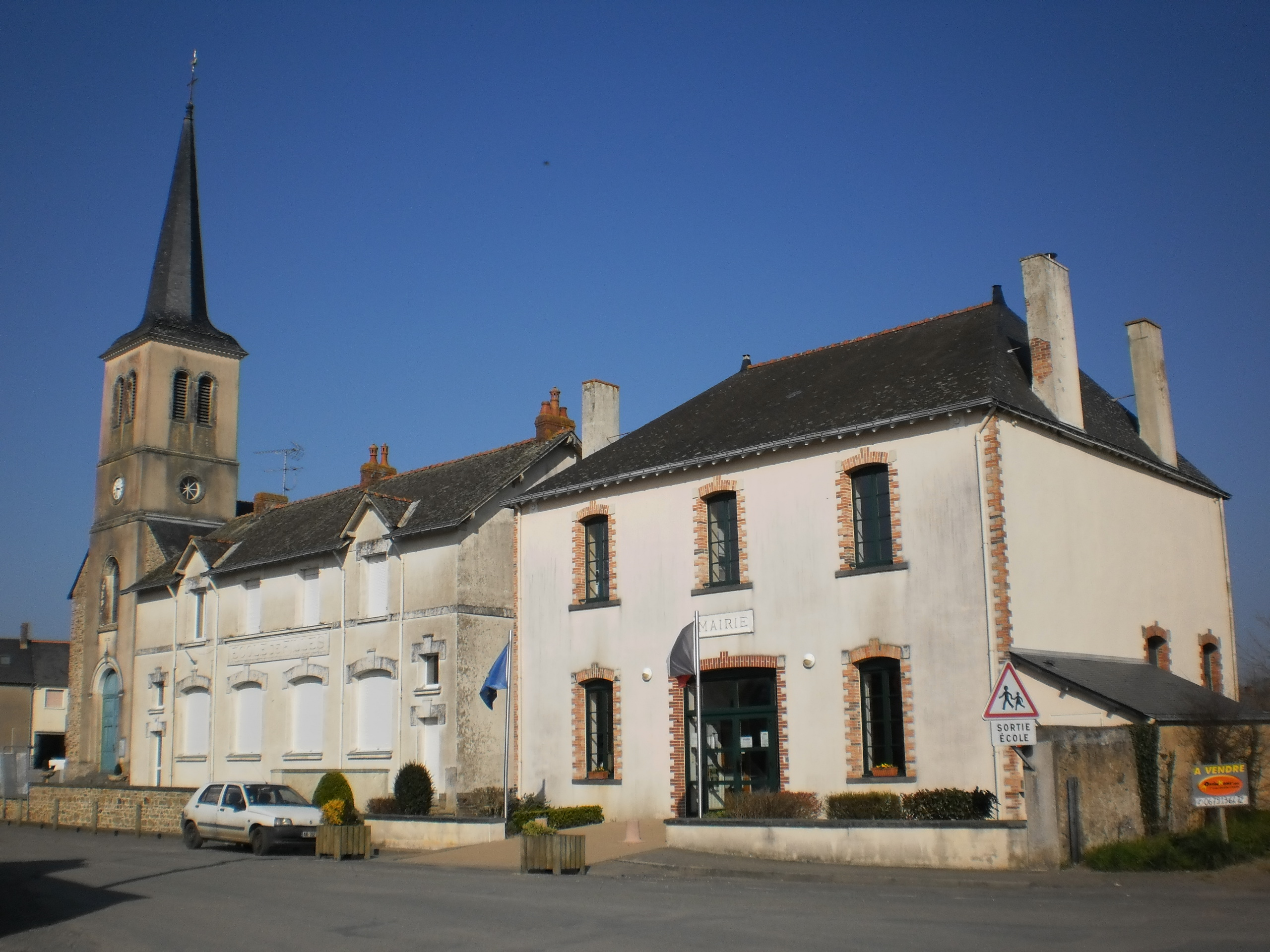
- The town hall and church in Soulvache

- Coat of arms
- Location of Soulvache
- Location within France Location within Pays de la Loire
- Coordinates: 47°49′48″N 1°28′20″W
- Country: France
- Region: Pays de la Loire
- Department: Loire-Atlantique
- Arrondissement: Châteaubriant-Ancenis
- Canton: Châteaubriant
- Intercommunality: Châteaubriant-Derval

Government
  - Mayor (2025–2026): Sandra Hersant
- Area^{1}: 11.27 km^{2} (4.35 sq mi)
- Highest elevation: 109 m (358 ft)
- Lowest elevation: 37 m (121 ft)
- Population (2023): 338
  - Density: 30.0/km^{2} (77.7/sq mi)
- Demonym(s): Soulvachaises, Soulvachais
- Time zone: UTC+01:00 (CET)
  - Summer (DST): UTC+02:00 (CEST)
- INSEE/Postal code: 44200 /44660
- Website: http://www.cc-castelbriantais.fr/
- ^{1} French Land Register data, which excludes lakes, ponds, glaciers > 1 km^{2} (0.386 sq mi or 247 acres) and river estuaries.

Soulvache (French pronunciation: [sulvaʃ]; Breton: Soulvac'h) is a commune in the Loire-Atlantique department in western France.

== Geography ==
The Brutz forms all of the commune's western border, then flows into the Semnon, which forms all of its northern border.

== See also ==
- Communes of the Loire-Atlantique department
