= Jans =

Jans Jantz (Gallo) Hentieg (Breton)
- Commune
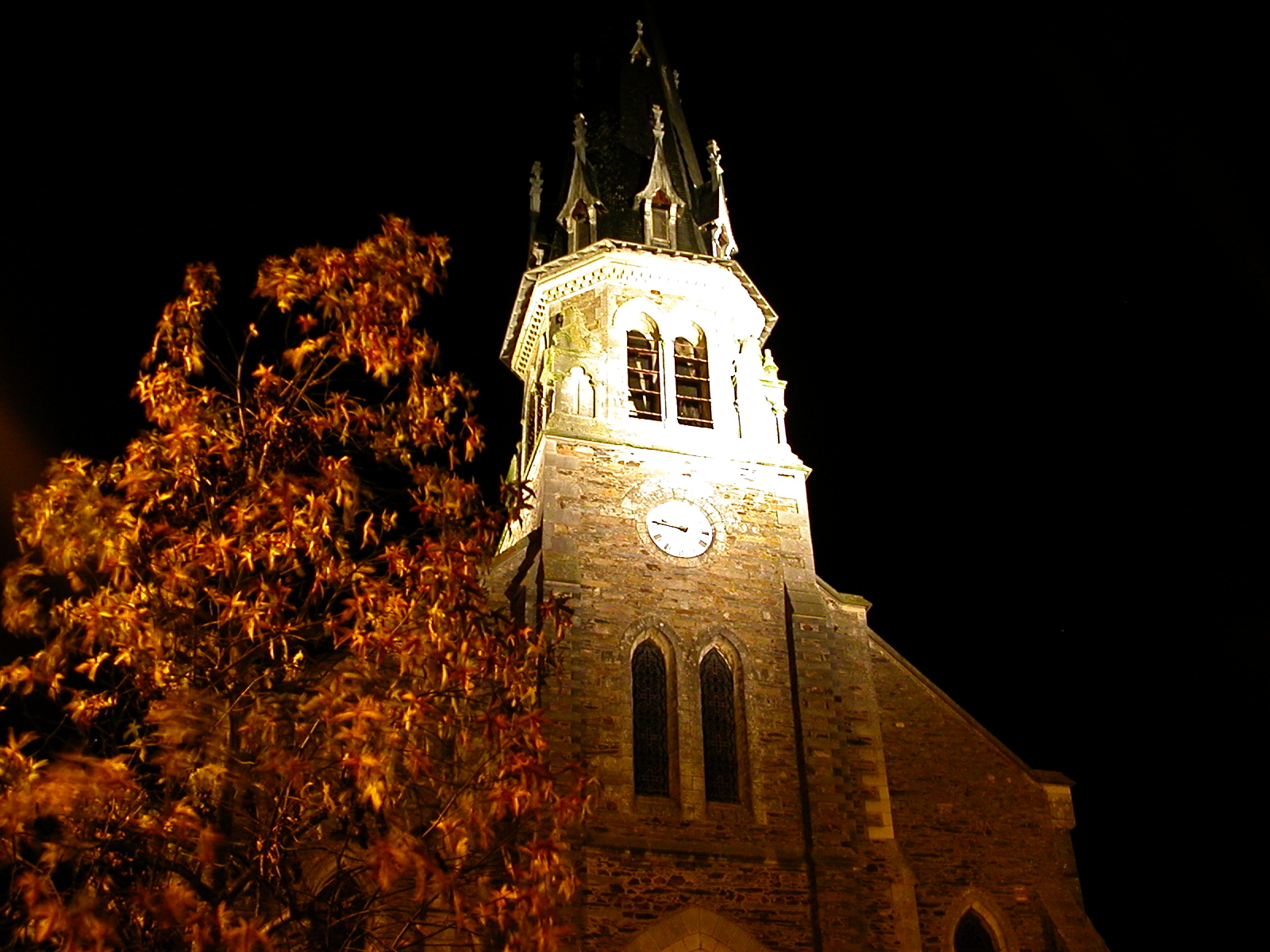

- Coat of arms
- Location of Jans
- Location within France Location within Pays de la Loire
- Coordinates: 47°37′18″N 1°36′46″W
- Country: France
- Region: Pays de la Loire
- Department: Loire-Atlantique
- Arrondissement: Châteaubriant-Ancenis
- Canton: Guémené-Penfao
- Intercommunality: Châteaubriant-Derval

Government
  - Mayor (2020–2026): Marie-Irène Bouin
- Area^{1}: 33.21 km^{2} (12.82 sq mi)
- Highest elevation: 56 m (184 ft)
- Lowest elevation: 13 m (43 ft)
- Population (2023): 1,364
  - Density: 41.07/km^{2} (106.4/sq mi)
- Time zone: UTC+01:00 (CET)
  - Summer (DST): UTC+02:00 (CEST)
- INSEE/Postal code: 44076 /44170
- ^{1} French Land Register data, which excludes lakes, ponds, glaciers > 1 km^{2} (0.386 sq mi or 247 acres) and river estuaries.

Jans (French pronunciation: [ʒɑ̃s]; Gallo: Jantz, Breton: Hentieg) is a commune in the Loire-Atlantique department in western France.

== Population ==
Historical population
Year	Pop.	±% p.a.
1968	1,076	—
1975	991	−1.17%
1982	1,023	+0.46%
1990	1,041	+0.22%
1999	989	−0.57%
2007	1,023	+0.42%
2012	1,226	+3.69%
2017	1,370	+2.25%
2023	1,364	−0.07%
Source: INSEE

== See also ==
- Communes of the Loire-Atlantique department
