= La Meilleraye-de-Bretagne =

La Meilleraye-de-Bretagne La Melherae (Gallo) Melereg-Breizh (Breton)
- Commune
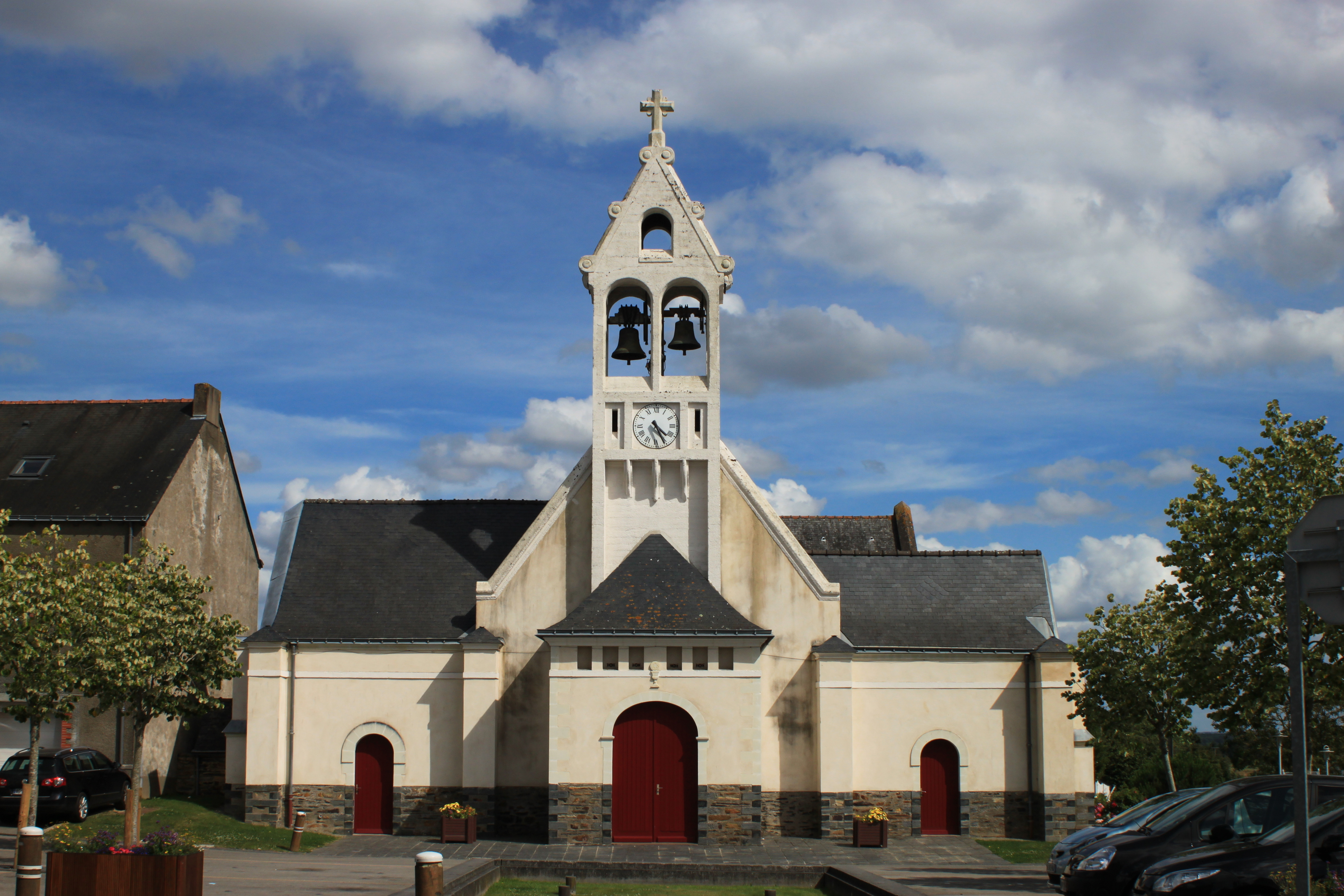

- Coat of arms
- Location of La Meilleraye-de-Bretagne
- Location within France Location within Pays de la Loire
- Coordinates: 47°33′37″N 1°24′01″W
- Country: France
- Region: Pays de la Loire
- Department: Loire-Atlantique
- Arrondissement: Châteaubriant-Ancenis
- Canton: Châteaubriant
- Intercommunality: Châteaubriant-Derval

Government
  - Mayor (2020–2026): Marie-Pierre Guérin
- Area^{1}: 27.63 km^{2} (10.67 sq mi)
- Highest elevation: 91 m (299 ft)
- Lowest elevation: 29 m (95 ft)
- Population (2023): 1,606
  - Density: 58.13/km^{2} (150.5/sq mi)
- Time zone: UTC+01:00 (CET)
  - Summer (DST): UTC+02:00 (CEST)
- INSEE/Postal code: 44095 /44520
- ^{1} French Land Register data, which excludes lakes, ponds, glaciers > 1 km^{2} (0.386 sq mi or 247 acres) and river estuaries.

La Meilleraye-de-Bretagne (French pronunciation: [la mɛjʁɛ də bʁətaɲ]; Gallo: La Melherae, Breton: Melereg-Breizh) is a commune in the Loire-Atlantique department in western France.

== Geography ==
La Meilleraye is situated 18 km south of Châteaubriant.

=== Climate ===
Climate from 1971 to 2000

- Average annual temperature : 11.6 °C
- Number of days with a temperature smaller than -5 °C: 1.6
- Number of days with a temperature greater than 30 °C: 4.1
- Average annual temperature change: (Note: Average annual temperature change is measure of the difference between the average temperature in January and the average temperature in July. This variable is generally considered to be the difference between oceanic and continental climates.) 13.7 °C
- Cumulative yearly rainfall: 738mm
- Number of days of rain in January: 11.9
- Number of days of rain in July: 6.8

== Population ==
Historical population
Year	Pop.	±% p.a.
1968	1,129	—
1975	1,045	−1.10%
1982	1,074	+0.39%
1990	1,097	+0.27%
1999	1,027	−0.73%
2007	1,219	+2.17%
2012	1,447	+3.49%
2017	1,527	+1.08%
2023	1,606	+0.84%
Source: INSEE

== See also ==
- Communes of the Loire-Atlantique department
