= Saint-Julien-de-Vouvantes =

- Commune
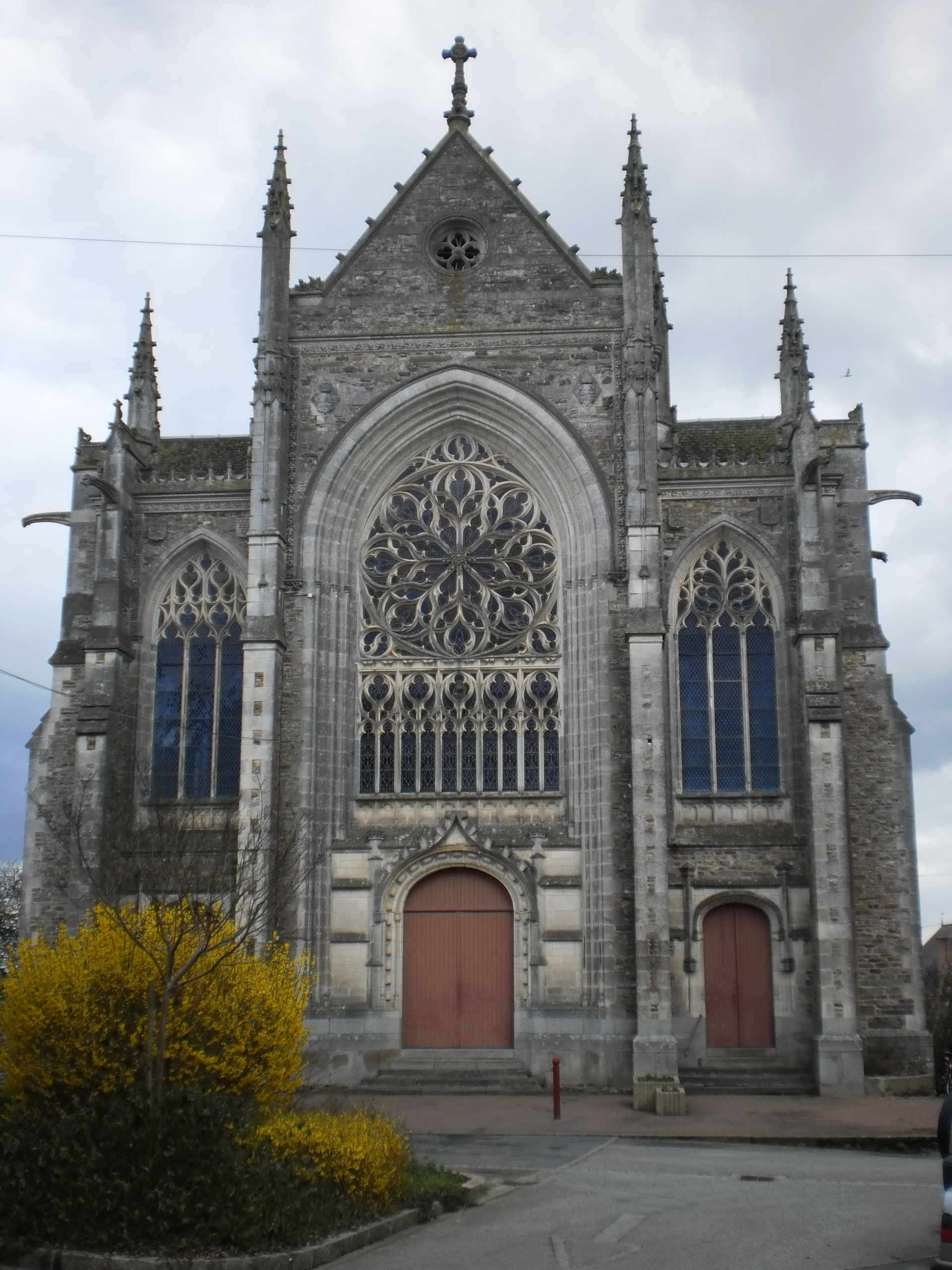
- The church in Saint-Julien-de-Vouvantes

- Coat of arms
- Location of Saint-Julien-de-Vouvantes
- Location within France Location within Pays de la Loire
- Coordinates: 47°38′33″N 1°14′15″W
- Country: France
- Region: Pays de la Loire
- Department: Loire-Atlantique
- Arrondissement: Châteaubriant-Ancenis
- Canton: Châteaubriant
- Intercommunality: Châteaubriant-Derval

Government
  - Mayor (2020–2026): Jean-Michel Chevalier
- Area^{1}: 25.6 km^{2} (9.9 sq mi)
- Elevation: 68 m (223 ft)
- Highest elevation: 99 m (325 ft)
- Lowest elevation: 47 m (154 ft)
- Population (2023): 961
  - Density: 37.5/km^{2} (97.2/sq mi)
- Time zone: UTC+01:00 (CET)
  - Summer (DST): UTC+02:00 (CEST)
- INSEE/Postal code: 44170 /44670
- ^{1} French Land Register data, which excludes lakes, ponds, glaciers > 1 km^{2} (0.386 sq mi or 247 acres) and river estuaries.

Saint-Julien-de-Vouvantes (French pronunciation: [sɛ̃ ʒyljɛ̃ də vuvɑ̃t]; Breton: Sant-Juluan-Gouwent) is a commune in the Loire-Atlantique department in western France.

== See also ==
- Communes of the Loire-Atlantique department
