= Petit-Auverné =

- Commune
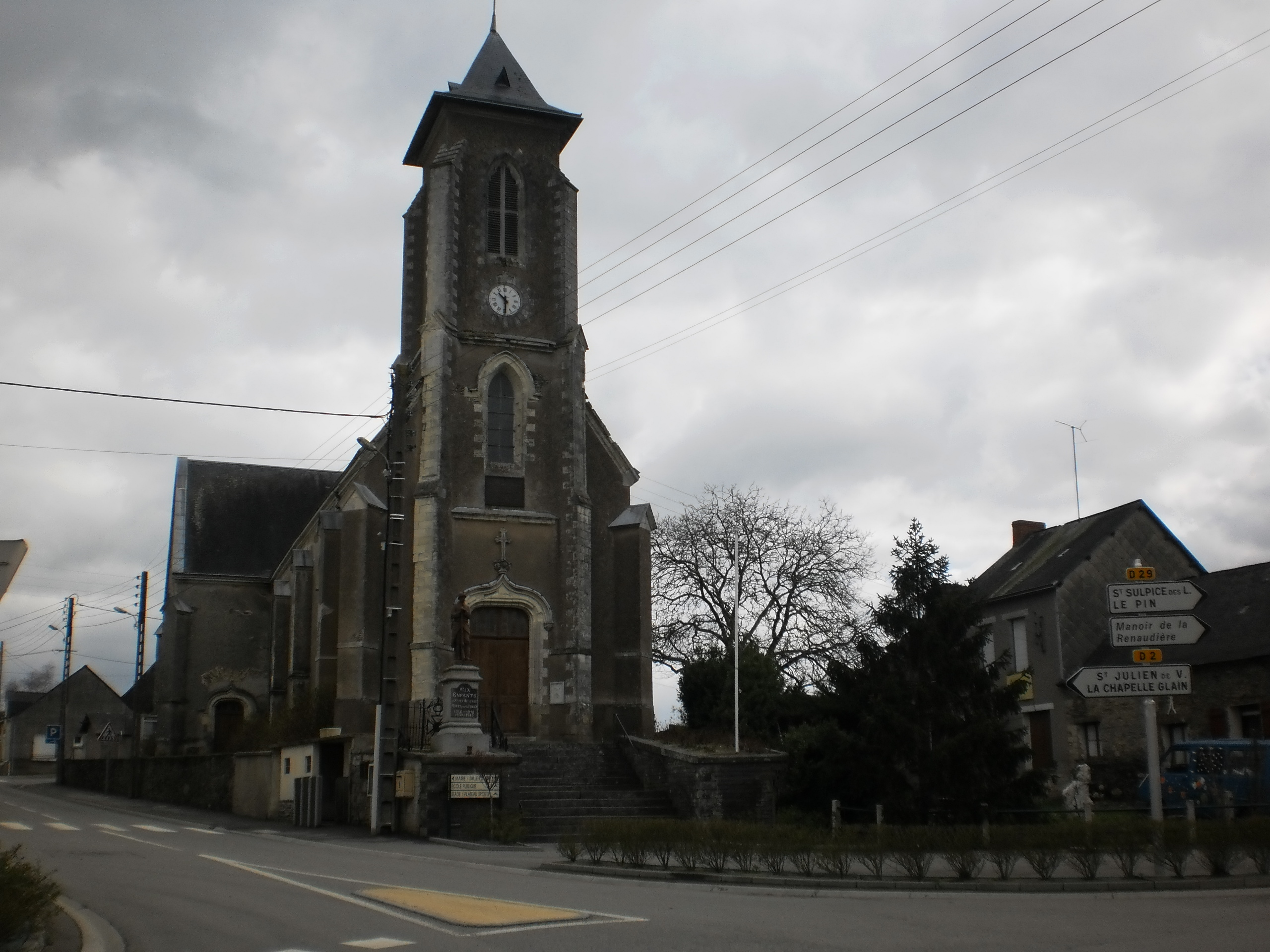

- Coat of arms
- Location of Petit-Auverné
- Location within France Location within Pays de la Loire
- Coordinates: 47°36′39″N 1°17′21″W
- Country: France
- Region: Pays de la Loire
- Department: Loire-Atlantique
- Arrondissement: Châteaubriant-Ancenis
- Canton: Châteaubriant
- Intercommunality: Châteaubriant-Derval

Government
  - Mayor (2020–2026): Jean-Pierre Desfosses
- Area^{1}: 22.53 km^{2} (8.70 sq mi)
- Highest elevation: 81 m (266 ft)
- Lowest elevation: 37 m (121 ft)
- Population (2023): 434
  - Density: 19.3/km^{2} (49.9/sq mi)
- Time zone: UTC+01:00 (CET)
  - Summer (DST): UTC+02:00 (CEST)
- INSEE/Postal code: 44121 /44670
- ^{1} French Land Register data, which excludes lakes, ponds, glaciers > 1 km^{2} (0.386 sq mi or 247 acres) and river estuaries.

Petit-Auverné (French pronunciation: [pəti.t‿ovɛʁne]; Breton: Arwerneg-Vihan) is a commune in the Loire-Atlantique department in western France.

== Population ==
Historical population
Year	Pop.	±% p.a.
1968	560	—
1975	508	−1.38%
1982	438	−2.10%
1990	414	−0.70%
1999	386	−0.78%
2007	405	+0.60%
2012	427	+1.06%
2017	428	+0.05%
2023	434	+0.23%
Source: INSEE

== See also ==
- Communes of the Loire-Atlantique department
