= Cornulier family =

Cornulier Family
- Origin: Duchy of Brittany
- Seat: Château de Montreuil; Château de la Touche; Château de Lucinière; Château de Fontaine-Henry; Château de Laurens Castelet; Château de la Motte-des-Vaux; Château du Plessis-de-Vair; Château de la Droitière
- Titles: Mayor of Nantes; Grand Masters of Waters and Forests of Brittany; President with Mortarboard; President of Accounts; Treasurer General of France; Provost of Brittany Ecclesiastical offices: Bishop of Rennes; Abbot; Commendatory prior Chamberlain
- Connected families: de Lucinière de La Lande de La Touche
- Motto: D'azur, au rencontre de cerf d'or, surmonté entre son bois d'une moucheture d'hermine d'argent (Azure, with a golden stag, surmounted between its antlers by a silver ermine spot.)

The Cornulier family is an extant family of the French nobility originating in Brittany. It was recognized in 1668 as a family of ancient nobility on the basis of a documented lineage dating back to 1487. Some authors have suggested an earlier origin, tracing it to 1380 and linking it to the House of Cornillé, although this connection has not been conclusively demonstrated.

The Cornulier family was notably established in the County of Nantes, particularly in Nozay, Anetz, and Saint-Herblon. It produced several mayors of Nantes and was primarily oriented toward judicial careers rather than military service, providing several presidents à mortier to the Parliament of Brittany.

== History ==
=== A hypothetical origin: the House of Cornillé ===
According to a tradition reported by Haillan, historiographer of France and genealogist of the Order of the Holy Spirit, the Cornulier family originally bore the name Cornillé and was said to descend from the former lords of the parish of Cornillé in the diocese of Rennes.

==== Grégoire de Cornillé (around 1380) ====
According to tradition, the family is said to descend from a figure named Grégoire de Cornillé, who around 1380 was allegedly authorized by Duke John IV of Brittany to modify his coat of arms and to adopt the name Cornulier in place of Cornillé.

==== Descendants of Grégoire de Cornillé ====
According to genealogical tradition, Grégoire de Cornillé had a son, Guillaume, residing in the parish of Mécé, who appears under the name Cornillé in the inquiry of 1427 and under that of Cornulier in 1429.

Guillaume's son, Guillaume II de Cornillé, who died before 1498, had three sons: Yves de Cornillé, a man-at-arms in the royal ordinances in 1501; René de Cornillé, secretary to François de Laval, Baron of Châteaubriant, and churchwarden of Saint-Jean-de-Béré in 1546; and Pierre, generally identified with Pierre Cornulier, regarded as the ancestor of the extant Cornulier family.

=== Controversies over the Cornillé–Cornulier lineage ===
René Kerviler noted that, in the Généalogie de la maison Cornulier published in 1863, Ernest de Cornulier sought to establish a direct descent of the family from the Mécé branch of the Cornillé family, based on a change of name and coat of arms, presenting this hypothesis as probable in the absence of conclusive evidence.

Gustave Chaix d’Est-Ange observed that the hypothesis of a common origin between the Cornulier and Cornillé families has been accepted with reservations by several historians of Breton nobility. He also noted that seventeenth-century judgments confirming nobility, together with the works of Lainé and Potier de Courcy, trace the Cornulier lineage to Pierre Cornullier, sieur de la Haudelinière, active in the late fifteenth century. According to Ernest de Cornulier-Lucinière, this individual may correspond to Pierre, the third son of Guillaume II de Cornillé, though this identification remains debated.

=== The Cornulier family in the early modern period ===
Reliable records of the Cornulier family exist from the late fifteenth century onward.

The family developed into two main branches, whose members were confirmed in the nobility of ancient extraction on 17 November 1668, based on a documented lineage dating to 1487.

According to Régis Valette in Catalogue de la noblesse française subsistante (2007), the Cornulier family is recognized as belonging to the nobility of ancient extraction, without any associated noble title for the surviving branch.

=== Contemporary period ===
The Cornulier family joined the Mutual aid association of the French nobility (ANF) in 1946.

== Possessions ==
=== Lordships and noble possessions ===
In the early modern period, members of the House of Cornulier were:

- Lords of La Touche (Nozay), Lucinière, La Haye, Les Croix, Les Gravelles, Boismaqueau, Le Meix, Vernay, La Caraterie, La Parochère, La Sionnière, La Rivaudière, Lorière, Le Pesle, Montreuil;
- Barons of Montrelais and Quintin in Vannes;
- Barons and later Counts of La Roche-en-Nort, among others;
- Viscounts of Rezé;
- Counts of Largouët and Vair;
- Marquises of Châteaufromont (from 1683 to 1738).

=== Castles and properties ===
Castles and properties
- Château de Lucinière, Joué-sur-Erdre
- Château de Montreuil, Nort-sur-Erdre
- Hôtel de Cornulier
- Manor of the Three Crosses, Rennes, purchased in 1599
- Manor of Kerandraou, Troguéry
- Château du Brossais, Saint-Gravé
- Manor of Créac'h Allan, Quimper
- Château du Plessis-de-Vair, Anetz
- Manor of La Rivaudière, Chevaigné
- Villa of the Bretaudières, Saint-Philbert-de-Grand-Lieu
- Château de la Lande, Saint-Hilaire-de-Loulay
- Château du Bois-Corbeau, Saint-Hilaire-de-Loulay
- Château du Plessis-de-Vair
- Château de Boismaquiau, Teillé
- Château du Bois-Cornillé, Val-d’Izé
- Château de la Caraterie, Paulx
- Château de la Touche, Nozay
- Fortress of Largoët, Elven
- Château de la Motte-des-Vaux, Ercé-en-Lamée
- Château de Fontaine-Henry, Fontaine-Henry
- Château de Laurens Castelet, Benquet
- Château de Nay, Sucé-sur-Erdre
- Château de la Rousselière, Frossay
- Château de la Droitière, Mauves-sur-Loire

== Arms ==
The family arms are blazoned: D'azur, au rencontre de cerf d'or, surmonté entre son bois d'une moucheture d'hermine d'argent (Azure, a stag's head caboshed Or, surmounted between its antlers by an ermine spot Argent).

== Titles ==
- The family held the title of Marquis of Châteaufromont, granted by letters patent in September 1683; the title became extinct in 1738.

== Notable individuals ==
=== Under the Ancien Régime (before 1789) ===
- Pierre de Cornulier, lord of La Touche (d. 1588), served as general of finances in Brittany and as mayor of Nantes from 1569 to 1570.
- Claude de Cornulier (1568–1645), lord of Les Croix, La Haye, Gravelle, and La Touche, held the same office of general of finances in Brittany and was mayor of Nantes from 1605 to 1606.
- Pierre Cornulier (1575–1639) was abbot of the Abbey of Notre-Dame de Blanche-Couronne in 1612, bishop of Tréguier from 1617 to 1619, and bishop of Rennes from 1619 until his death in 1639.
- Claude de Cornulier (1633–1700) served as councillor to the Grand Conseil in 1655, later became president à mortier at the Parliament of Brittany, and was created marquis of Châteaufromont by letters patent in September 1683.
- Toussaint Charles François de Cornulier (1740–1779) served as president at the Parliament of Brittany.
- Toussaint François Joseph de Cornulier (1771–1794), his son, joined the constitutional guard of Louis XVI (1791–1792), later emigrated, and was executed by guillotine on 19 July 1794 at the age of 23.
- Charles-René de Cornulier also held the position of president at the Parliament of Brittany.

=== Nineteenth century and early twentieth century ===
- Toussaint Jean Hippolyte de Cornulier (1789–1862), son of Toussaint François Joseph, soldier, politician, and industrialist.
- Jean Baptiste Théodore Benjamin de Cornulier-Lucinière (1773–1824), officer and mayor of Nort-sur-Erdre.
- Louis-Auguste de Cornulier (1778–1843), leader of the Vendéan insurgents, colonel and Knight of Saint Louis.
- Ernest de Cornulier-Lucinière (1804–1893), naval officer, director of the naval observatory at the port of Lorient, and writer.
- Hippolyte de Cornulier-Lucinière (1809–1886), soldier and politician.
- René de Cornulier-Lucinière (1811–1886), admiral and monarchist-oriented politician, mayor of Nantes in 1874.
- Auguste de Cornulier de La Lande (1812–1886), mayor of Saint-Hilaire-de-Loulay, general councillor, senator of Vendée from 1876 to 1886, sitting on the monarchist benches.
- Alfred de Cornulier-Lucinière (1822–1855), soldier, served in Algeria under the orders of Louis Juchault de Lamoricière, before taking part in the Crimean War under the command of Patrice de Mac Mahon. He was killed during this conflict at the Battle of Malakoff in September 1855, while serving as a battalion commander of chasseurs à pied of the Imperial Guard. Rue de Cornulier in Nantes was named in his honor.
- Gontran de Cornulier (1825–1898), deputy for Calvados. He participated in the founding in 1864 of the Society for the Encouragement of the Improvement of the French Half-Bred Horse, of which he became the first director.
- Raoul de Cornulier-Lucinière (1838–1898), divisional general.
- Gustave de Cornulier-Lucinière (1855–1929), divisional general. In September 1914, he commanded the 5th Division of the Cavalry Corps attached to the Sixth Army under General Maunoury. He distinguished himself during the Battle of the Ourcq, carrying out on 9 September a raid as far as the Ourcq between German lines, described as “one of the finest feats of arms in the record of the cavalry.”

=== Gallery ===
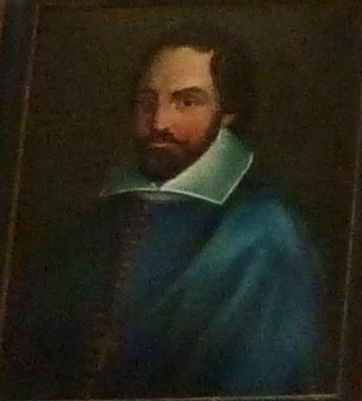
Mgr Pierre Cornulier (1575–1639)

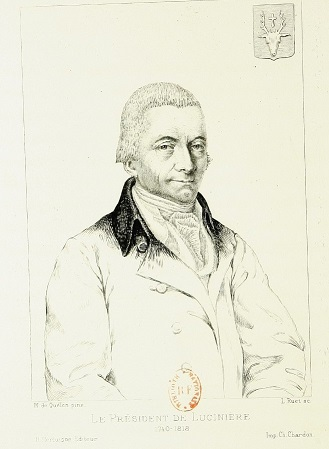
The President of Lucinière

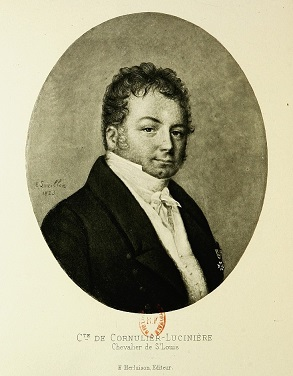
Jean-Baptiste Théodore Benjamin de Cornulier-Lucinière (1773–1824)

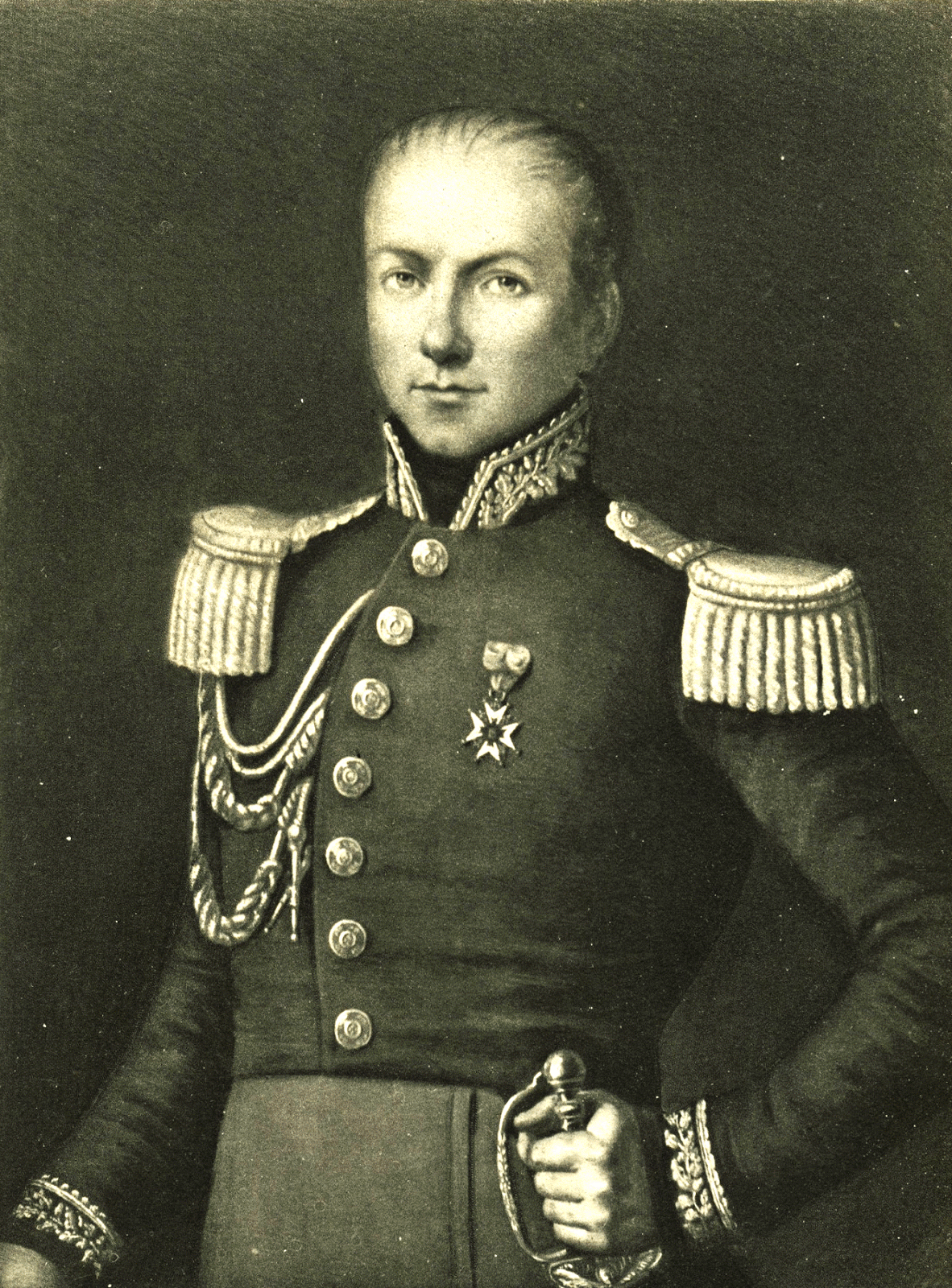
Louis-Auguste de Cornulier (1778–1843).

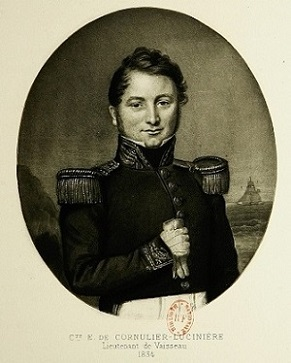
Ernest de Cornulier-Lucinière (1804–1893)

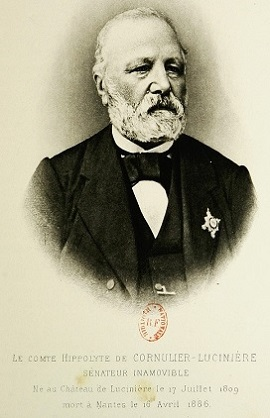
Hippolyte de Cornulier-Lucinière (1809–1886)

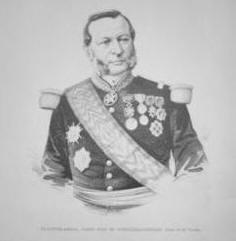
Admiral René de Cornulier (1811–1886).

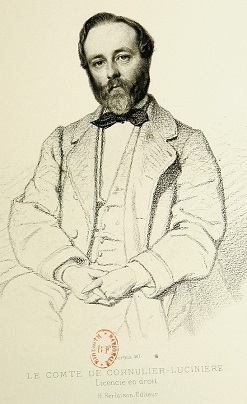
Théodore Gabriel Benjamin Charles de Cornulier-Lucinière (1817–1870)

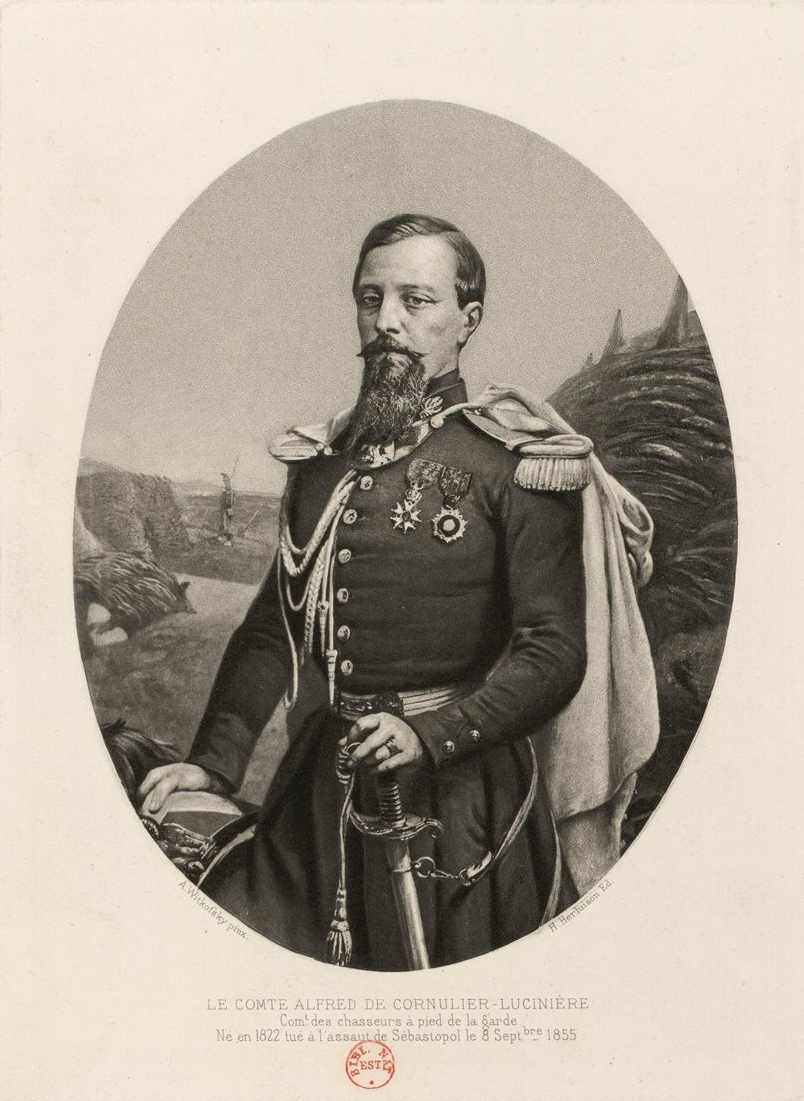
Alfred de Cornulier-Lucinière (1822–1855)

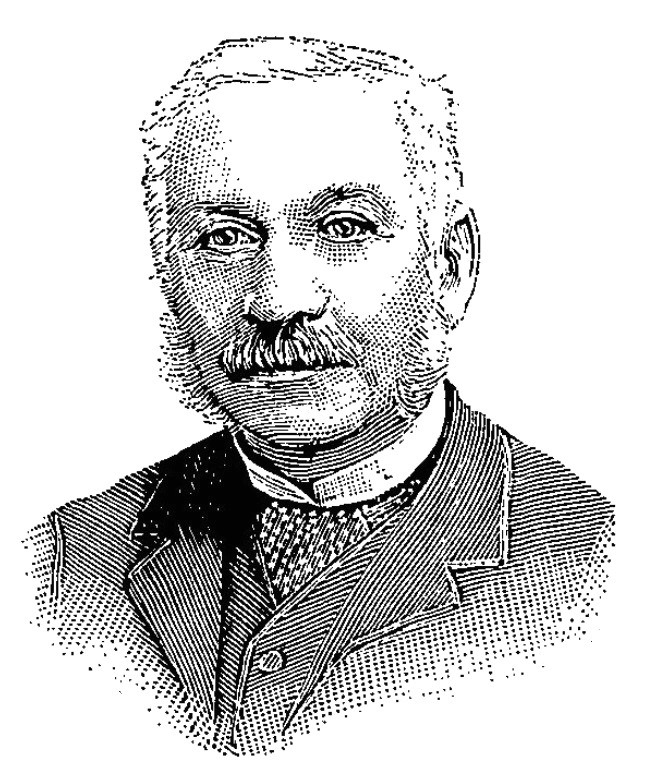
Gontran de Cornulier (1825–1898).

== Alliances ==
The principal marriage alliances of the Cornulier family are with: Champion de Cicé (1594), de la Noue (1604), de Goulaine (1620), du Bois de la Ferronnière (1627), de Charette (1635), Hay des Nétumières (1663 and 1766), de Trémereuc (1702), de Boislève (1719), de Montmorency (1718), du Dresnay (1740), de Saint-Pern (1787, 1788, 1815), du Merdy de Catuélan (1756, 1765), de Monti (1817), de Sesmaisons (1824), de Mauléon (1844), Le Doulcet de Méré (1847), d’Oilliamson (1802, 1898), Daniel de Boisdenemets (1877), de Cussy (1869), de Goyon, Desfriches-Doria (1799), de Lespinay (1810, 1833), de Lorgeril (1903), Boux de Casson (1707, 1870), de Becdelièvre (1735), de Kerméno (1628), du Bourblanc (1767), du Bahuno du Liscoët (1793), de Vélard (1866), de Couétus (1835, 1860), de La Tour du Pin (1838), du Couédic (1871), de Lambilly (1863), Law de Lauriston (1846), du Breil de Pontbriand (1908), among others.

== Tributes ==
- Hôtel de Cornulier, in Rennes.
- Rue de Cornulier, in Nantes.
- Prix de Cornulier, created in honor of Gontran de Cornulier (1825–1898).

== See also ==
- List of mayors of Nantes

== Bibliography ==
- Chaix d'Est-Ange, Gustave (1912). Dictionnaire des familles françaises anciennes ou notables à la fin du XIXe siècle [Dictionary of Old or Notable French Families at the End of the 19th Century] (in French). Vol. XI. impr. de C. Hérissey (Évreux). pp. 418–423.}
- Kerviler, René (1897). Répertoire général de bio-bibliographie bretonne [General directory of Breton bio-bibliography] (in French). pp. 290–312.
- Lainé, Louis (1850). Archives généalogiques et historiques de la noblesse de France [Genealogical and historical archives of the nobility of France] (in French). Vol. 11. p. 2.
