= Charette family =

French noble family

- Country: Brittany (Nantes)
- Historic seat: 16th century - present day
- Titles: State Councillor; Seneschal of Nantes; Councillor to the Parliament of Brittany; Councillor and President of the Brittany Chamber of Accounts; Lieutenant General of the Presidial Court of Nantes; Mayor of Nantes; Minister; Deputy; Regional Councillor; Military duties: King Louis XIII page; Officers
- Connected members: de La Contrie de La Gascherie de La Colinière de la Bretonnière
- Motto: D'argent au lion de sable, armé et lampassé de gueules, accompagné en pointe de trois canettes de sable, membrées et becquées de gueules. (Argent, a lion Sable, armed and langued Gules, in base three cans Sable, limbed and beaked Gules.)
- Estate: Kingdom of France

The Charette family represents a surviving lineage of the French nobility, classified as nobility of extraction. The family's origins are in Brittany.

The group includes mayors, seneschals, and magistrates from Nantes, as well as other magistrates from the Parliament and Chamber of Accounts of Brittany. It also comprises a State Councillor, military officers, the Vendée leader François Athanase Charette de La Contrie, and Hervé de Charette, a minister under the Fifth Republic.

== History ==
=== Origins ===
The Charette family is documented in the province of Brittany, specifically in the city of Nantes and its surrounding areas, including the communes of Sautron and Couffé.

However, studies by authors and genealogists differ regarding its origins and the source of its nobility. Henri Jougla de Morenas (1938) notes that the family has been known since the 14th century.

In their respective works, Michel de Saint Pierre (1977), Roger Coindreau, and André Borel d'Hauterive posit that in 1370, Jean Charette, a resident of Trévignet in the vicinity of Plermoël, was knighted on the battlefield at Chisey in Poitou by Constable Bertrand du Guesclin (1320–1380). Additionally, Borel d'Hauterive (1851) posits that the family may have originated in Italy, descending from a son of Galeas Carretto, Marquis of Finale, who settled in Brittany in 1240. This ancestor is said to have married Jeanne Dubois de la Salle, a lady-in-waiting to Alix, Duchess of Brittany. In addition, he is believed to have received lands in Trévignet from Pierre de Dreux, who was known as Mauclerc. Their descendant, Guyon Charette, Lord of Trévignet, is thought to have adopted the French name "Charette" and to have served as seneschal of Nantes.

In the 1840 publication Nobiliaire et armorial de Bretagne by Pol Potier de Courcy, a genealogist of Breton nobility, the following is written: In 1508, Pierre had a son, Jean, with Jacquette de Barlagat, a native of the Auverné region. Jean married Mathurine du Beyzit, a native of the parish of Saint-Dolay, in 1535. Their union resulted in the establishment of the Charette family, which would go on to encompass numerous branches. Since 1572, this family has produced an auditor, two masters, and the first president of the Chamber of Accounts; provosts, magistrates, seneschals, and seven mayors of Nantes; twenty deputies from Nantes to the Estates of Brittany, several of whom were presidents of the Third Estate; and six counselors in Parliament. "A page of Louis XIII, who was killed at the siege of Gravelines in 1614 while fighting alongside Marshal de la Meilleraye; a knight of the Order in 1646; an abbess of the Trinity of Poitiers in 1692; and three Knights of Malta since 1762." Furthermore, the same source indicates that "This family appears to have originated from the same lineage as the lords of Trévignet, in the parish of La Chapelle, and Penhoat, in the parish of Fégréac, known as Charette. They are documented in the Reformation and Musters of the Nobility between 1426 and 1543 in La Chapelle-sous-Ploërmel and Fégréac."

Gustave Chaix d'Est-Ange wrote in 1911: "[...] It is generally supposed, though without certain evidence, that the currently existing Charette family shares a common origin with a family of the same name that, during the Middle Ages, owned the noble house of Trévignet, in the parish of La Chapelle-sous-Ploërmel." He continues: "There has also been an attempt, again without any proof, to trace the Charette family of Trévignet back to the Carretto family, which held a distinguished position in Florence." He further adds: "[...] The Charette family of Trévignet is known starting with a certain N. Charette, lord of Trévignet, who lived in 1334. The descendants of this gentleman appeared in the reformation and musters of the nobility of the Saint-Malo diocese from 1426 to 1543 and became extinct around the mid-16th century." Chaix d'Est-Ange begins the lineage of the Charette family with Guillaume Charette, who married Mathée de Nault and, around 1400, owned the estate of La Thomazière in the parish of Sautron, in the Nantes diocese. He lists the key family members up to the 16th century and writes: "(...) The nobiliary status of these various individuals does not seem to have been very elevated. One might wonder whether, despite the judgment of confirmation of nobility in 1668, the Charette family did not derive its noble status merely from the mayoralty of Nantes or the offices its members held starting in 1572 at the Chamber of Accounts of Brittany."

=== Proofs of nobility ===
Regarding the nobility of the Charette family, Régis Valette (2002) writes: "extraction, confirmed in 1668." (Note: Extracted families are those who prove their nobility at least a century before the date of the nobility maintenance judgment (in 1666, when the great nobility searches began, nobility had to be proven since at least 1560).)

The family obtained two confirmations of nobility:

- 1668 (decision of the Reformation Chamber)
- 1699 (judgment of the Intendant of Brittany).

=== The Charette Family in Nantes ===
Since the sixteenth century, numerous members of the family have occupied a variety of roles in Nantes. Two family members were appointed as counselors at the Parliament of Brittany.

- Jean de Charette, squire, lord of La Bretonnière, husband of Mathurine du Bézit, royal counselor, alloué (assistant) to the lieutenant general at the presiding seat of Nantes.
  - Jean (de) Charette, lord of La Colinière and La Lormière, husband of Marguerite de Trégouet.
    - Alexandre Charette, lord of La Noë and du Pellan, was the seneschal of Nantes and mayor of Nantes from 1619 to 1621.
    - Louis Charette, lord of La Colinière, was mayor of Nantes from 1613 to 1614, husband of Jeanne Ernault.
      - Jean (de) Charette, lord of La Gascherie, was mayor of Nantes from 1650 to 1652, and husband of Madeleine Menardeau.
        - Louis (de) Charette, lord of La Gascherie, was mayor of Nantes from 1675 to 1676, husband of Madeleine Charette, daughter of Jacques Charette, lord of Montbert.
  - Jean (de) Charette, Lord of La Bretonnière and La Lormière, Lieutenant General at the presidial court of Nantes, married Julienne Druays in 1564.
    - René Charette, Lord of La Bretonnière, Counselor at the Parliament of Brittany in 1598 and mayor of Nantes in 1609, grandfather of:
      - René Charette, Lord of La Bretonnière: Mayor of Nantes in 1635, husband of Charlotte de Cornulier.
        - Jacques Charette, Lord of Montbert: Mayor of Nantes in 1669 and first president of the Chamber of Accounts of Brittany in 1677.
          - Gilles Charette, Lord of Montbert and counselor at the Parliament of Brittany in 1690, died in 1734.
- Julien (de) Charette, Sénéchal of Nantes during the Wars of the League.
- Jean (de) Charette, Lord of Lormière and La Colinière, auditor at the Chamber of Accounts in Nantes in 1572, promoted to master counselor in 1587, husband of Marguerite de Trégouet.
- Raoul (de) Charette, advocate General at the Chamber of Accounts in Nantes in 1581, provost of Nantes in 1602.

=== Other Notable Figures of the Ancien Régime ===
- Louis Charette, Page to King Louis XIII in 1637.
- Jean Charette, Lord of La Colinière and State Counselor in 1654.

=== During the War of the Vendée ===
- François Athanase Charette de La Contrie (1763–1796): Naval officer. During the War of the Vendée, peasants sought him to lead their revolt against the measures of the National Convention. He was executed in Nantes in 1796.

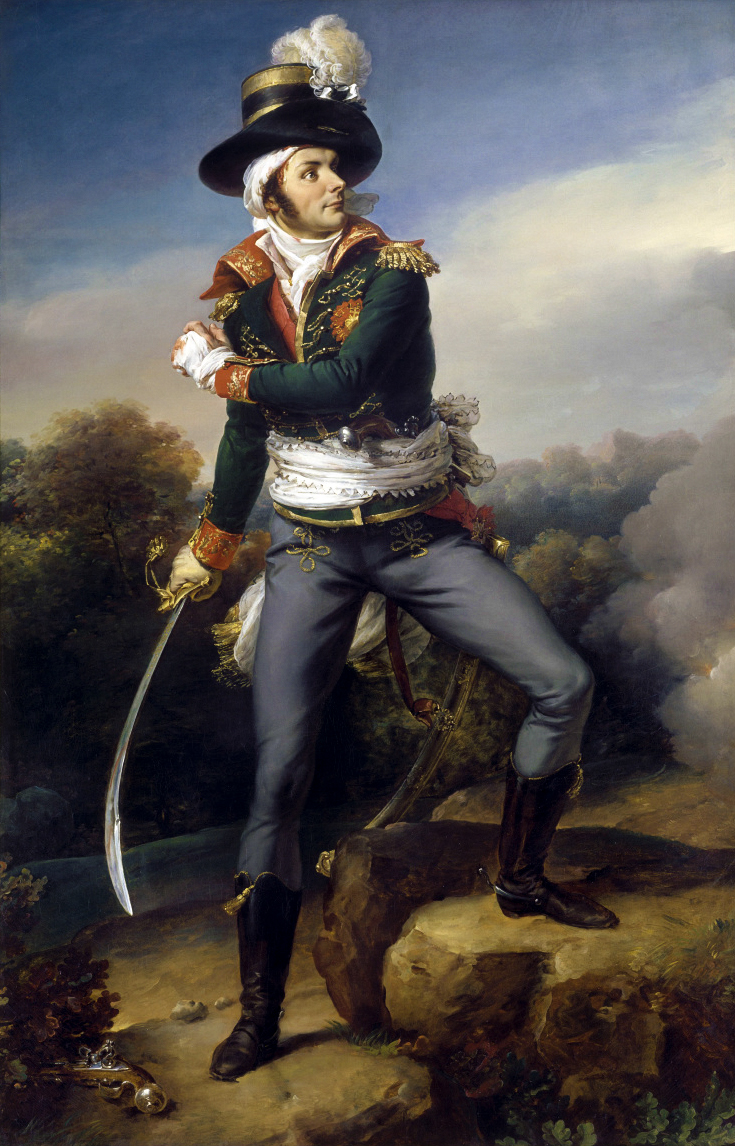
François-Athanase Charette de La Contrie (1763-1796).

- Louis Marin Charette de La Contrie (1759–1796): Brother of François Athanase. A lieutenant before 1789, he became a Vendéen combatant and divisional leader. He was killed in action in 1796.

=== 19th century ===
- Charles Athanase Marie de Charette de La Contrie (1796–1848): A cavalry colonel promoted to the Chamber of Peers in 1823 with the title of baron. He married Louise de Bourbon, Countess of Vierzon, the legitimized daughter of the Duke of Berry, in 1827. His descendants belong to the female lineage of Charles X through the Duke of Berry.
- Athanase de Charette de La Contrie (1832–1911): Lieutenant colonel in the Pontifical Zouaves and later a brigadier general.
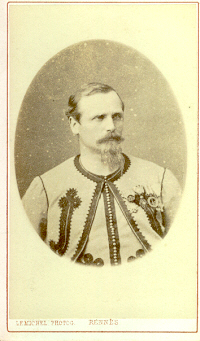
Athanase de Charette de La Contrie (1832-1911).

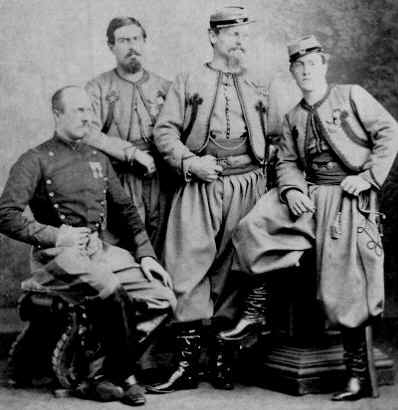
The Charette de La Contrie brothers, Papal Zouaves.

=== Since the 20th century ===
- Jean, Gaston, Marie, Joseph de Charette de La Contrie (1904–1944): Son of Baron Marie Joseph Athanase Georges Henri and Marie Joséphine Sophie Patard de la Vieuville. A reserve infantry lieutenant, he became a prisoner of war in 1940 and later joined the Resistance. Arrested by the Gestapo, he was deported to Germany in 1944, where he died from abuse and illness at Wilhelmshaven shipyards. Declared "Mort pour la France."
- Hervé de Charette (1938): Mayor, deputy, and three-time minister.
- Patrice de Charette (1949): Magistrate.
- Benoît de Charette: Winemaker, former president of the Beaune Chamber of Commerce and Industry, and president of the City of Climats and Burguandy Wines since 2021.
- Laurence de Charette (1969): Daughter of Hervé, journalist, and deputy editor-in-chief of Le Figaro since 2022.

== Family alliances ==
The principal alliances of this family are:

Montmorency (1752), Cornulier, Bretagne-Avaugour, Rohan, Clisson, La Trémoille, Cambout, Aubigny, Bedford, L'Épervier, La Poëze, Jochaud du Plessix, La Bourdonnaye, Monti, Poullain, Bureau, Sapinaud de La Rairie, Becdelièvre, Bourbon (1827), Montesquiou-Fezensac (1851), von Hanau, La Roche Saint-André, Cambout de Coislin, Fitz-James (1862), Goyon-Matignon (1863), Bourbon-Busset (1866), Durfort Civrac de Lorge (1872), Poulpiquet du Halgouët (1909), Guigné (1910), Tardif de Moidrey, Bardon de Segonzac, Montmorillon, Harcourt (1960), La Barre de Nanteuil (1977), Maupeou d'Ableiges (2018), Le Tourneux de La Perraudière, among others.

== Residences ==
- La Contrie Castle
- Bretonnière Castle
- Bois-Briand Castle
- Comper Castle
- Gascherie Castle
- Collinière Castle
- Briord Castle
- Chauvelière Castle
- Pont-Hus Castle
- Bussonnière Manor
- Brenière Castle
- La Desnerie Castle
- Kerfily Castle
- Motte-Glain Castle
- Charette Hotel
- Dracy-lès-Couches Castle
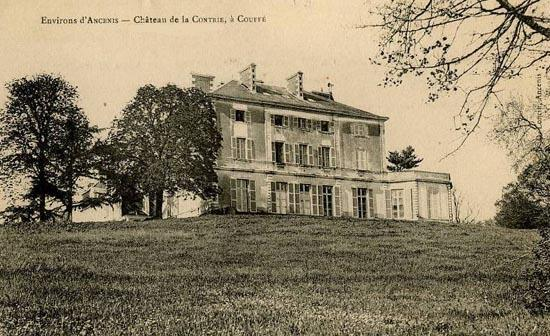
La Contrie Castle

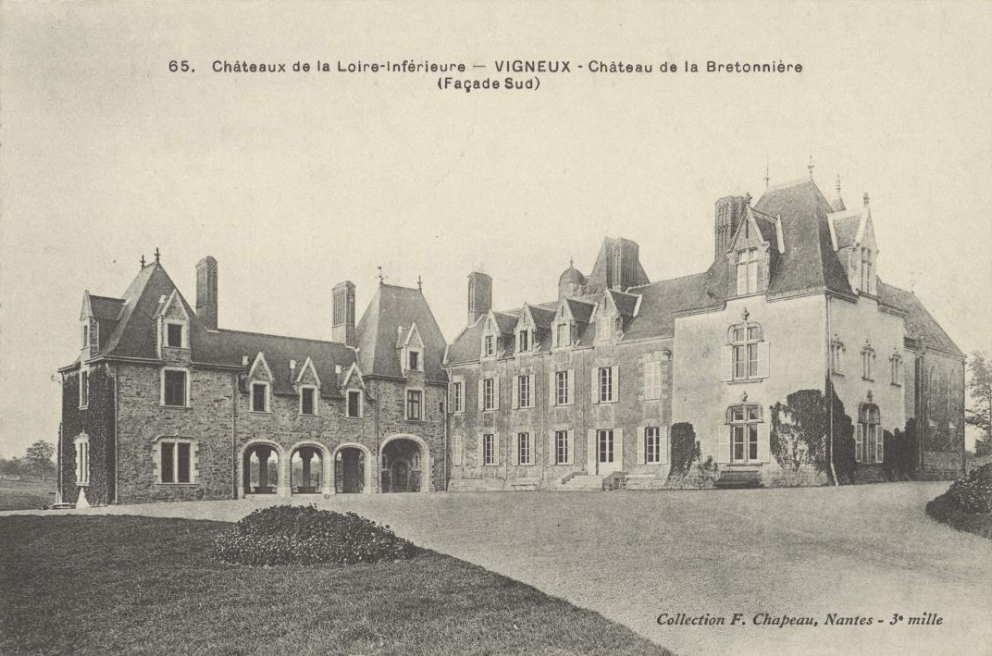
Bretonnière Castle.

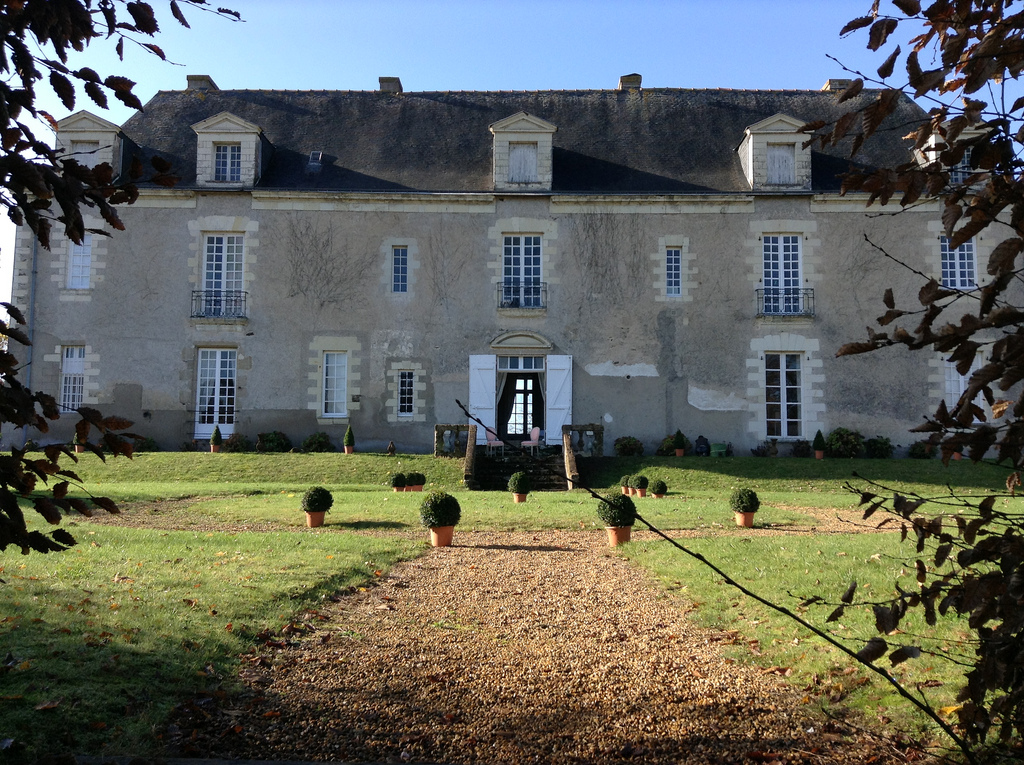
Bois-Briand Castle.

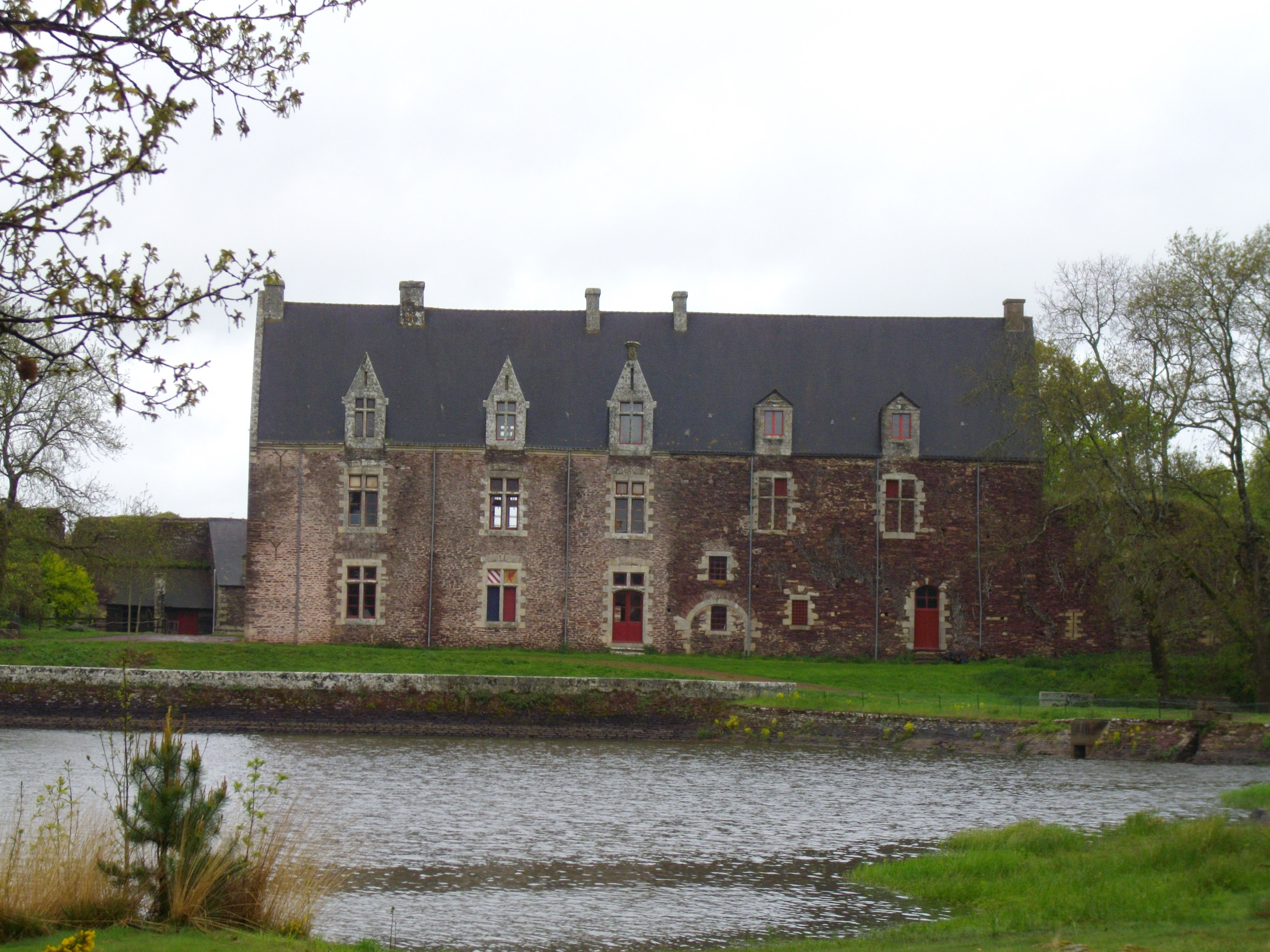
Comper Castle.

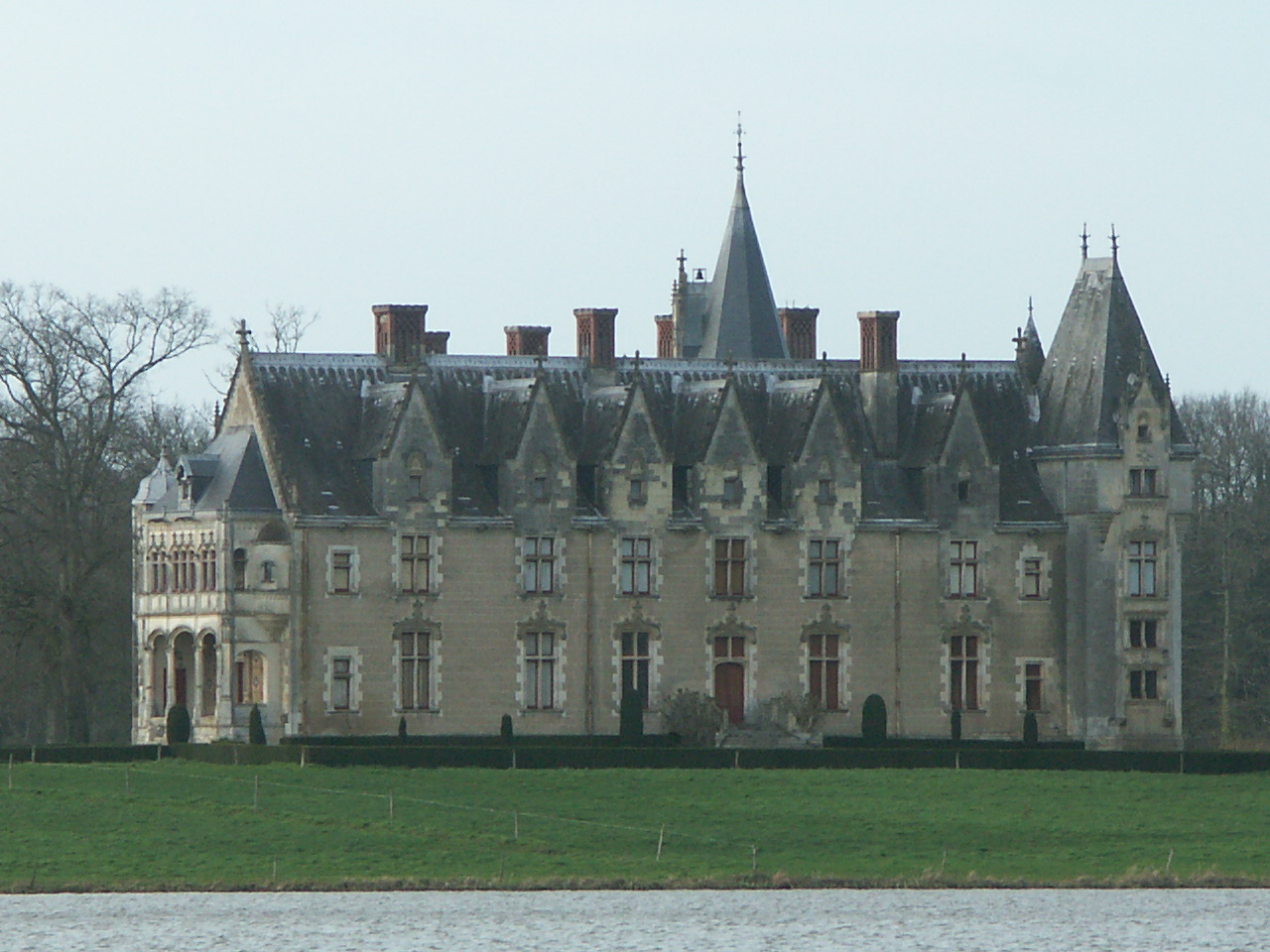
Gascherie Castle.

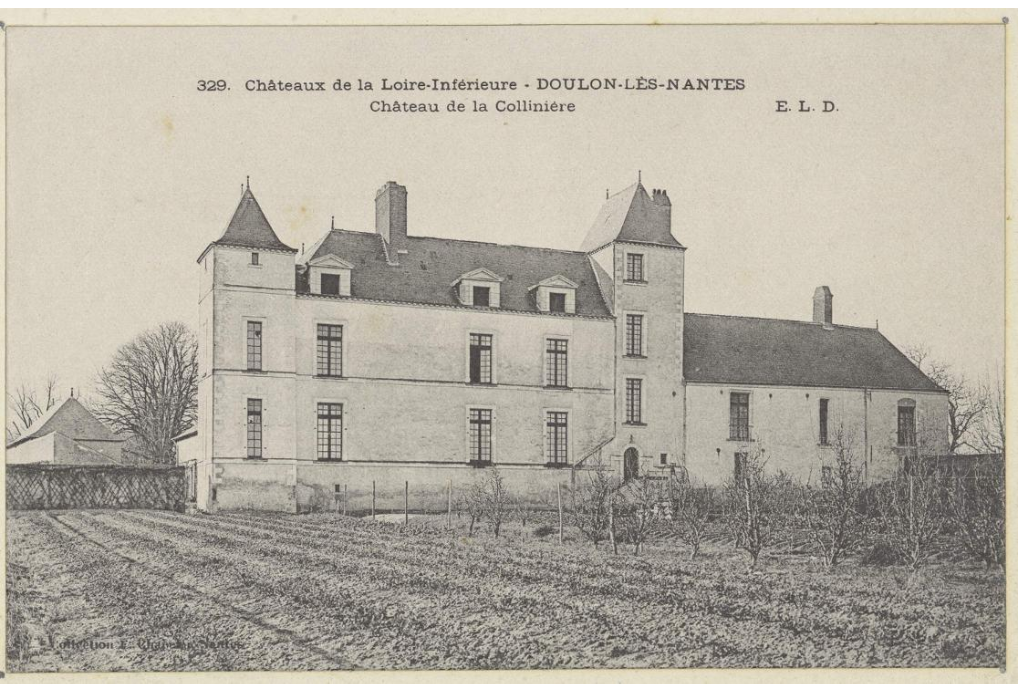
Collinière Castle.

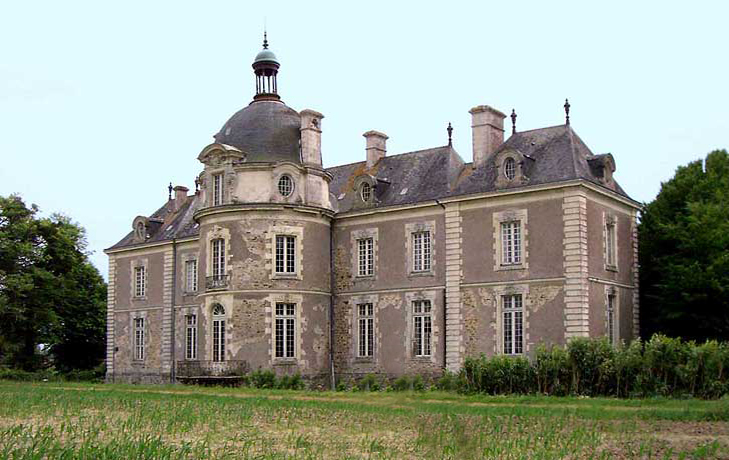
Briord Castle.

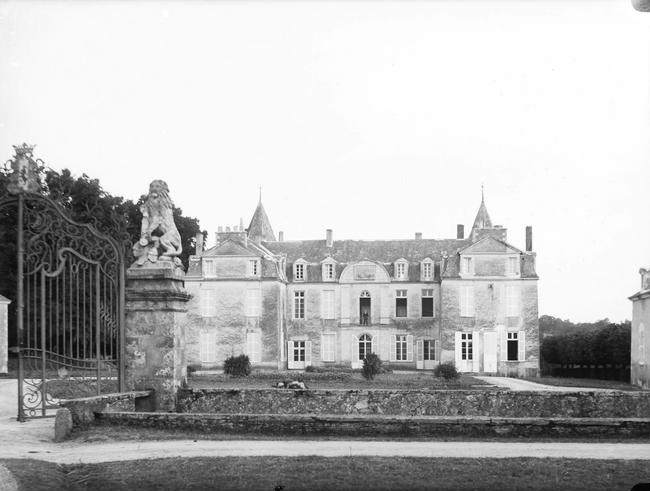
Chauvelière Castle.

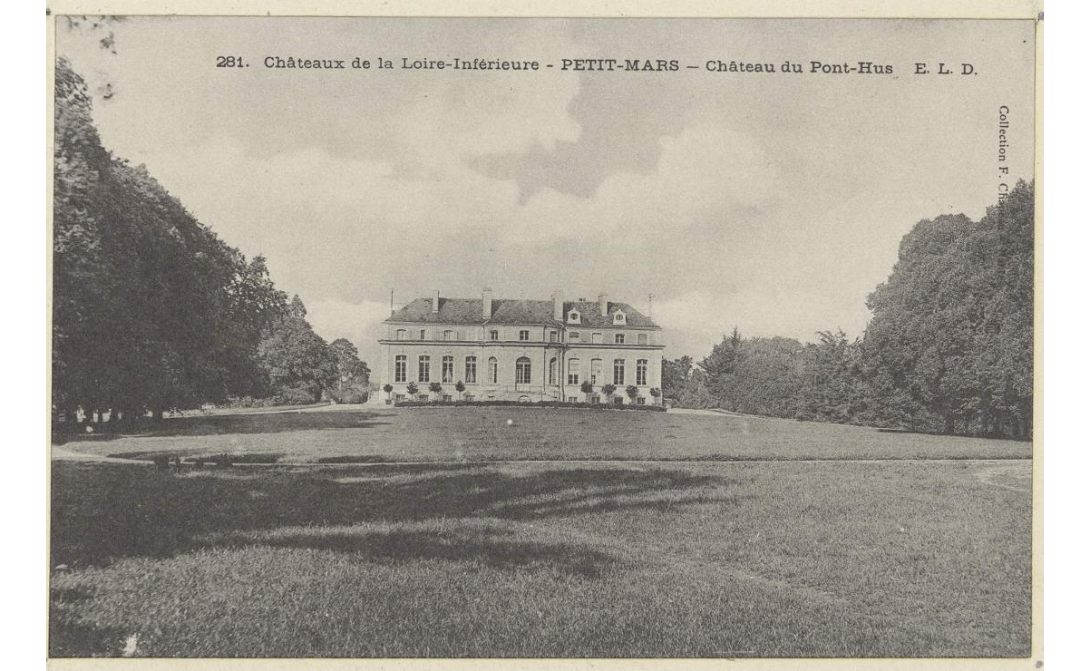
Pont-Hus Castle.

== Arms, Mottoes, and Titles ==
Arms

Blazon: Argent, a lion sable armed and langued gules, accompanied by three canettes (alternatively aiglettes or aigrettes) sable, beaked and membered gules, arranged 2 and 1 (or in point).

Support: Two crowned lions.

Title: Regular baron since 1823.

Ornament: The escutcheon is surrounded by a mantle of a Peer of France.

=== Armorial ===
The arms of this family vary according to branch and herald.

| Figure | Coat of arms |
|---|---|
| | Charette family Blazon: Argent, a lion cub sable in chief, accompanied in base by three merlettes sable arranged 2 and 1. Blazon: Argent, a lion sable armed and langued gules, accompanied in base by three canettes sable, beaked and membered gules. |
| | Charette de La Contrie Blazon: Argent, a lion sable supported by three canettes sable arranged 2 and 1. Other versions: Argent, a lion sable armed and langued gules, accompanied in base by three aiglettes sable, beaked and membered gules, arranged 2 and 1. Argent, a lion sable armed and langued gules, accompanied by three aiglettes sable, beaked and membered gules. The cadet branches bear a label gules. Argent, a lion sable armed and langued gules, accompanied by three merlettes sable arranged 2 and 1. |
| | Charette de La Gascherie Blazon: Argent, a lion sable accompanied by three canettes sable, two in chief and one in base. Ornament: Marquis crown and two lions as supporters. Other versions: Sometimes aiglettes are depicted as birds. |
| | Charette de Montbert Blazon: Argent, a lion sable supported by three displayed eagles sable arranged 2 and 1. Other versions: Argent, three eagles sable, beaked and membered gules, with a lion rampant sable in chief. The escutcheon azure. |
| | Charette de La Bretonnière Variations include: The escutcheon azure.; A "leopardized" lion.; The depiction of aigrettes as birds. |
| | Charette de La Colinière: Curious Case: François-Marie Charette de La Colinière, son of René Charette and Renée Le Brun, bore: Or a cart Gules. This canting arms (Charette ⇒ Charrette [French for "cart"]) prefigured the cart symbol used by the Vendée leader. |
| | Charette de La Joue: Louis Charette, Seigneur de La Joue, displayed three aigrettes aligned in a single row instead of the typical 2 and 1 arrangement. |

== Legacy ==
Recent works and the 2023 film Vaincre ou mourir commemorate François Athanase Charette de La Contrie.

== Bibliography ==
- Chaix d'Est-Ange, Gustave (1911). Dictionnaire des familles françaises anciennes ou notables à la fin du XIXe siècle [Dictionary of old or notable French families at the end of the 19th century] (in French). Vol. X. Evreux: Imprimerie Charles Herisseys. pp. 16–20.
- Chaix d'Est-Ange, Gustave (1903). Dictionnaire des familles françaises anciennes ou notables à la fin du XIXe siècle [Dictionary of old or notable French families at the end of the 19th century] (in French). Vol. X. Evreux: C. Hérissey. pp. 16–20.
- Valette, Régis (2007). Catalogue de la noblesse française [French nobility catalog] (in French). Paris: Éditions Robert Laffont. p. 60. ISBN 978-2-221-10875-8.
