= Ciocchi =

Ciocchi is an Italian surname. Notable people with the surname include:

- Giovanni Maria Ciocchi (1658–1725), Italian painter and art critic
- Ulisse Ciocchi (1570–1631), Italian painter

== See also ==
- Ciocci
- Ciocchi Del Monte
