= Vair-sur-Loire =

- Commune
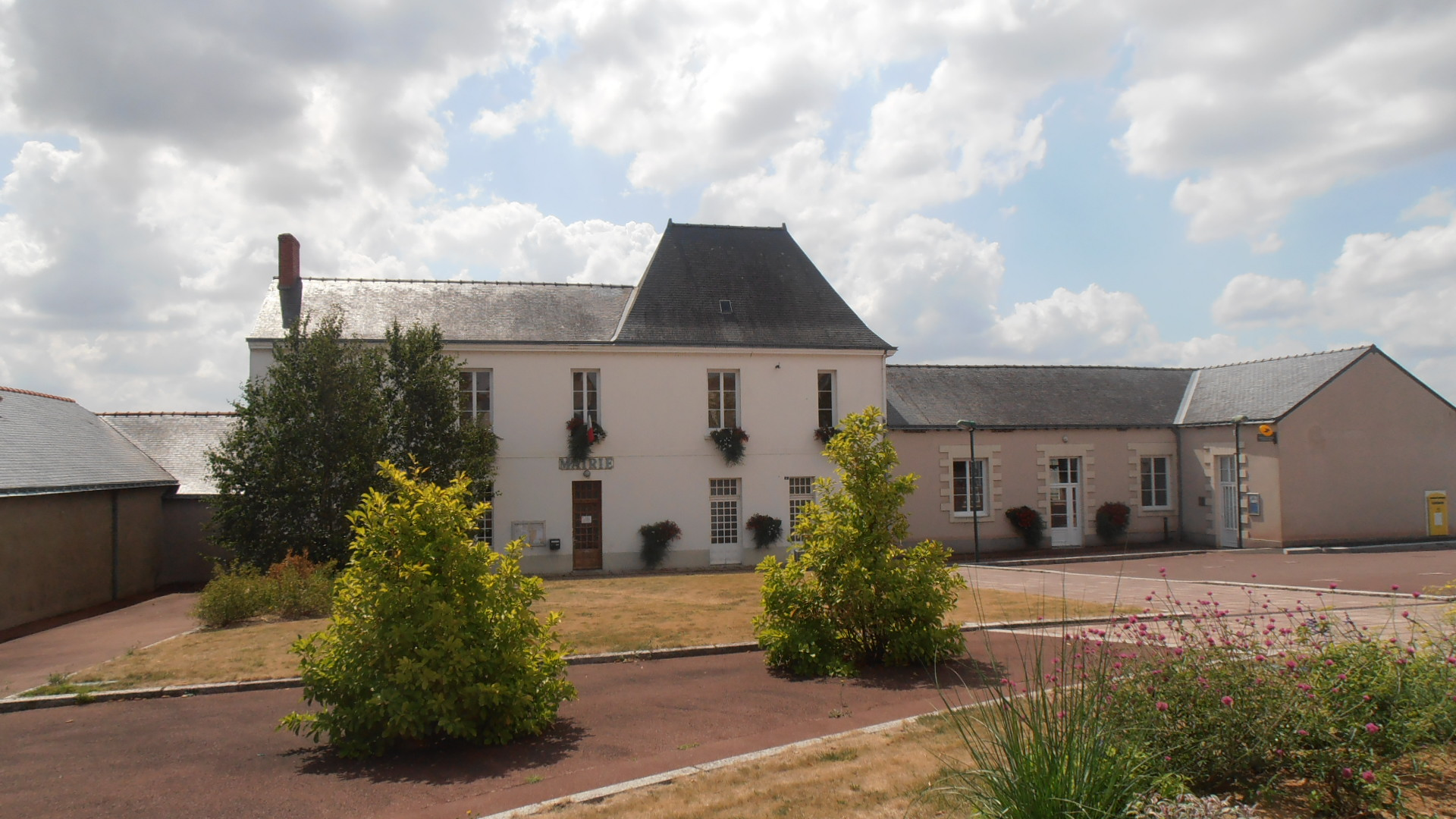
- The town hall of Saint-Herblon
- Location of Vair-sur-Loire
- Location within France Location within Pays de la Loire
- Coordinates: 47°24′25″N 1°05′42″W
- Country: France
- Region: Pays de la Loire
- Department: Loire-Atlantique
- Arrondissement: Châteaubriant-Ancenis
- Canton: Ancenis-Saint-Géréon

Government
  - Mayor (2024–2026): Amélie Cornilleau
- Area^{1}: 51.73 km^{2} (19.97 sq mi)
- Population (2023): 4,944
  - Density: 95.57/km^{2} (247.5/sq mi)
- Time zone: UTC+01:00 (CET)
  - Summer (DST): UTC+02:00 (CEST)
- INSEE/Postal code: 44163 /44150
- ^{1} French Land Register data, which excludes lakes, ponds, glaciers > 1 km^{2} (0.386 sq mi or 247 acres) and river estuaries.

Vair-sur-Loire (French pronunciation: [vɛʁ syʁ lwaʁ], literally Vair on Loire; Breton: Gwer-Liger) is a commune in the department of Loire-Atlantique, western France. The municipality was established on 1 January 2016 by merger of the former communes of Saint-Herblon and Anetz.

== Population ==
Population data refer to the commune in its geography as of January 2025.

Historical population
Year	Pop.	±% p.a.
1968	2,131	—
1975	2,568	+2.70%
1982	3,056	+2.52%
1990	3,206	+0.60%
1999	3,209	+0.01%
2007	3,840	+2.27%
2012	4,440	+2.95%
2017	4,671	+1.02%
2023	4,944	+0.95%
Source: INSEE

== See also ==
- Communes of the Loire-Atlantique department
