= Château de la Motte-Glain =

15th-century castle in Loire-Atlantique, France

Coordinates: 47°37′13″N 1°11′57″W

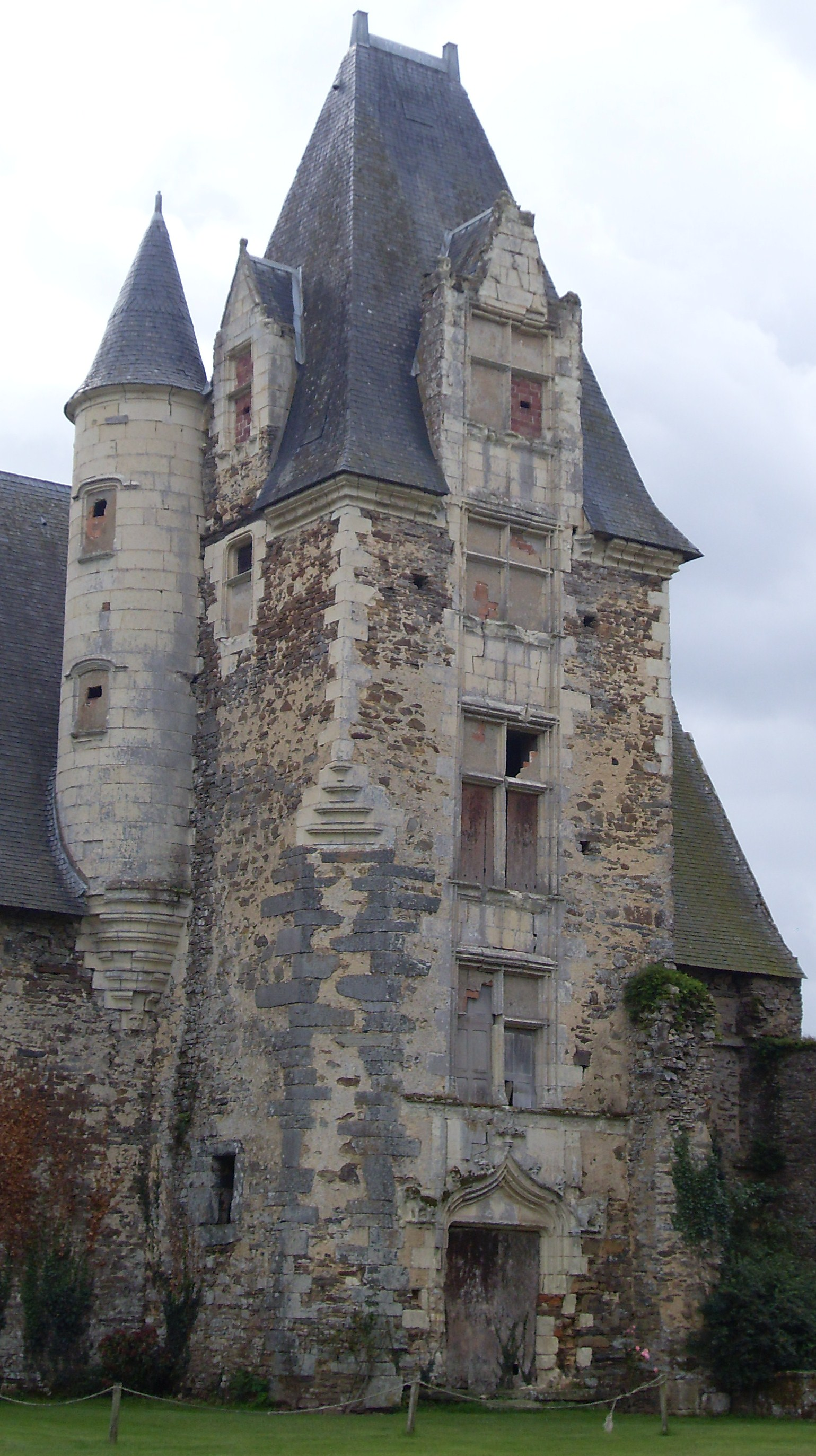

The Château de la Motte-Glain is a 15th-century castle in the commune of La Chapelle-Glain in the Loire-Atlantique département of France. It was modified by Pierre de Rohan-Gié in the 17th century.

== History ==
The castle was built by Pierre de Rohan-Gié in 1495 on the site of an older fortress belonging to the lords of Rougé.

Anne of Brittany and Charles VIII stayed there in 1497 and Charles IX and Catherine de' Medici in 1565. It was bought in 1635 by Michel Le Loup, counsellor to the Parlement of Rennes

== Architecture ==
The castle includes a gatehouse composed of a central pavilion flanked by two round towers, some ruined buildings (including a storeroom and a press), a residence decorated with Renaissance windows from the 15th century.

The chapel contains a fresco from the 16th century.

The castle is privately owned. Parts of it (gatehouse, storeroom, press, chapel, residence, bay, roof, wall) have been listed since 1926 and protected since 1929 as a monument historique by the French Ministry of Culture. It is open to the public in the summer months.

== See also ==
- List of castles in France
