= Nozay, Loire-Atlantique =

Nozay Nozàè/Nôzaï (Gallo) Nozieg (Breton)
- Commune
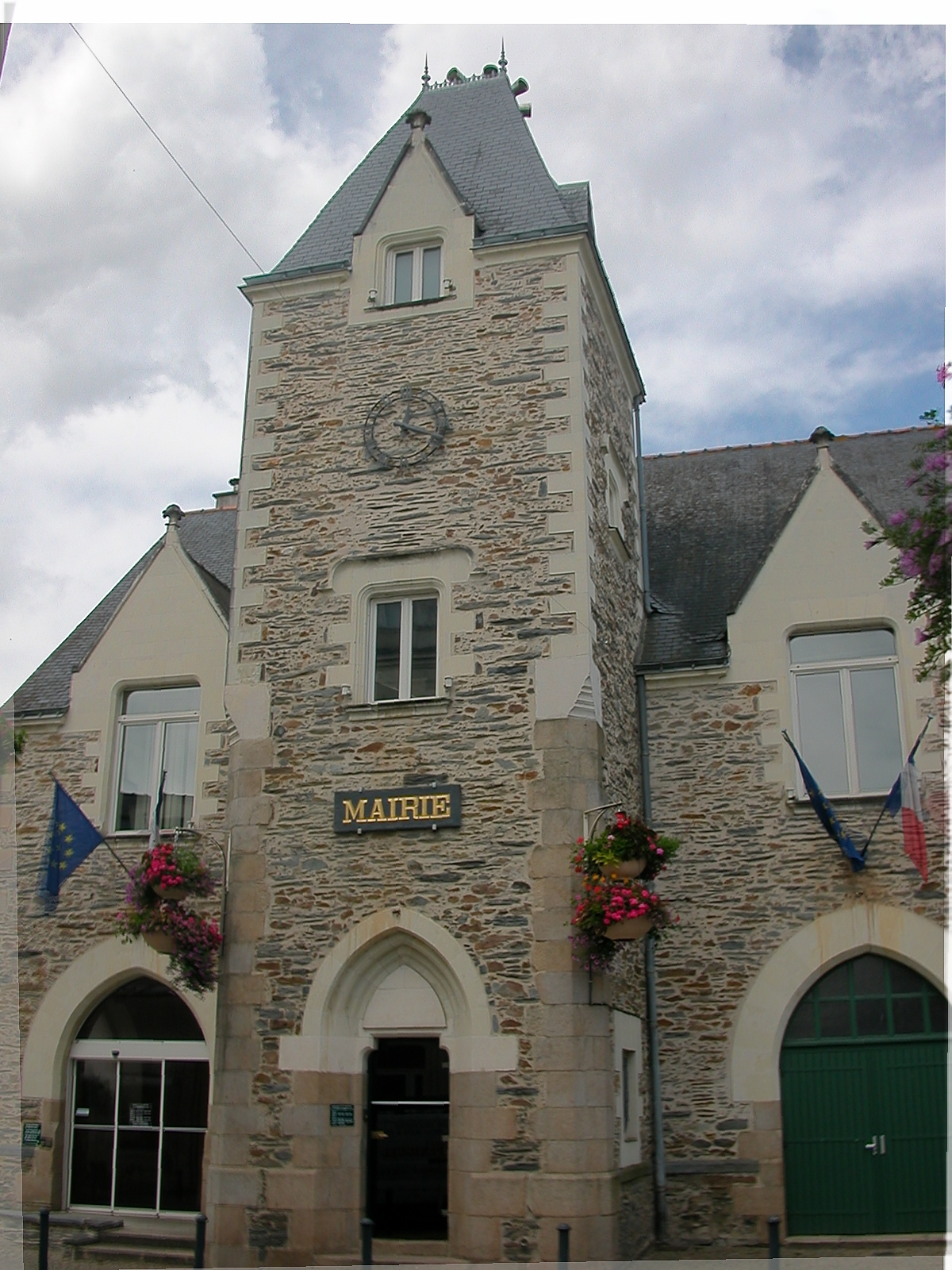
- Town hall

- Coat of arms
- Location of Nozay
- Location within France Location within Pays de la Loire
- Coordinates: 47°33′55″N 1°37′26″W
- Country: France
- Region: Pays de la Loire
- Department: Loire-Atlantique
- Arrondissement: Châteaubriant-Ancenis
- Canton: Guémené-Penfao
- Intercommunality: CC de Nozay

Government
  - Mayor (2020–2026): Jean-Claude Provost
- Area^{1}: 57.7 km^{2} (22.3 sq mi)
- Highest elevation: 96 m (315 ft)
- Lowest elevation: 13 m (43 ft)
- Population (2023): 4,292
  - Density: 74.4/km^{2} (193/sq mi)
- Time zone: UTC+01:00 (CET)
  - Summer (DST): UTC+02:00 (CEST)
- INSEE/Postal code: 44113 /44170
- Dialling codes: 02
- ^{1} French Land Register data, which excludes lakes, ponds, glaciers > 1 km^{2} (0.386 sq mi or 247 acres) and river estuaries.

Nozay (French pronunciation: [nɔzɛ]; Gallo: Nozàè or Nôzaï, Breton: Nozieg) is a commune in the Loire-Atlantique department in western France.

== Population ==
Historical population

Year	Pop.	±% p.a.
1793	2,051	—
1821	2,216	+0.28%
1846	3,037	+1.27%
1872	3,791	+0.86%
1901	3,966	+0.16%
1926	3,528	−0.47%
1946	3,382	−0.21%
1962	3,349	−0.06%
1968	3,242	−0.54%

Year	Pop.	±% p.a.
1975	3,237	−0.02%
1982	3,158	−0.35%
1990	3,050	−0.43%
1999	3,155	+0.38%
2007	3,696	+2.00%
2012	3,894	+1.05%
2017	4,150	+1.28%
2023	4,292	+0.56%

Source: EHESS and INSEE (1968-2023)

== See also ==
- Communes of the Loire-Atlantique department
- The works of Jean Fréour. Sculptor of Créviac calvary
