= Saint-Herblon =

- Part of Vair-sur-Loire
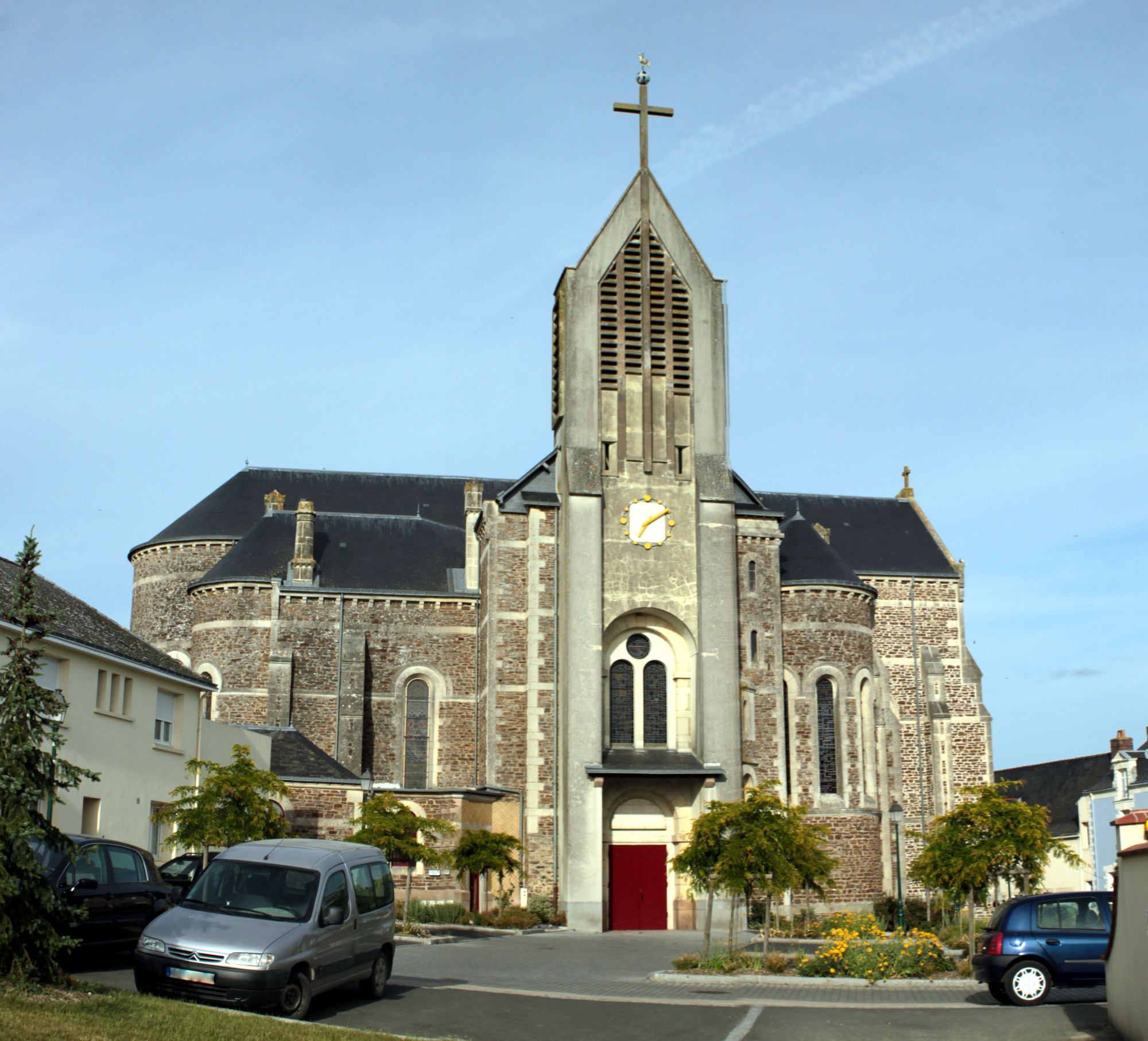
- The church of Saint-Hermeland, in Saint-Herblon

- Coat of arms
- Location of Saint-Herblon
- Location within France Location within Pays de la Loire
- Coordinates: 47°24′33″N 1°05′41″W
- Country: France
- Region: Pays de la Loire
- Department: Loire-Atlantique
- Arrondissement: Châteaubriant-Ancenis
- Canton: Ancenis-Saint-Géréon
- Commune: Vair-sur-Loire
- Area^{1}: 36.9 km^{2} (14.2 sq mi)
- Elevation: 91 m (299 ft)
- Highest elevation: 80 m (260 ft)
- Lowest elevation: 5 m (16 ft)
- Population (2022): 2,727
  - Density: 73.9/km^{2} (191/sq mi)
- Time zone: UTC+01:00 (CET)
  - Summer (DST): UTC+02:00 (CEST)
- Postal code: 44150
- ^{1} French Land Register data, which excludes lakes, ponds, glaciers > 1 km^{2} (0.386 sq mi or 247 acres) and river estuaries.

Saint-Herblon (French pronunciation: [sɛ̃.t‿ɛʁblɔ̃]; Breton: Sant-Ervlon-ar-Roz) is a former commune in the Loire-Atlantique department in western France. On 1 January 2016, it was merged into the new commune of Vair-sur-Loire.

== See also ==
- Communes of the Loire-Atlantique department
