= Ciocci =

Ciocci is an Italian surname. Notable people with the surname include:

- Giuseppe Ciocci (born 2002), Italian footballer
- Jacob Ciocci (born 1977), American artist, musician, and professor
- Jessica Ciocci (born 1976), American artist
- Massimo Ciocci (born 1968), Italian footballer and manager
