= Anetz =

- Part of Vair-sur-Loire
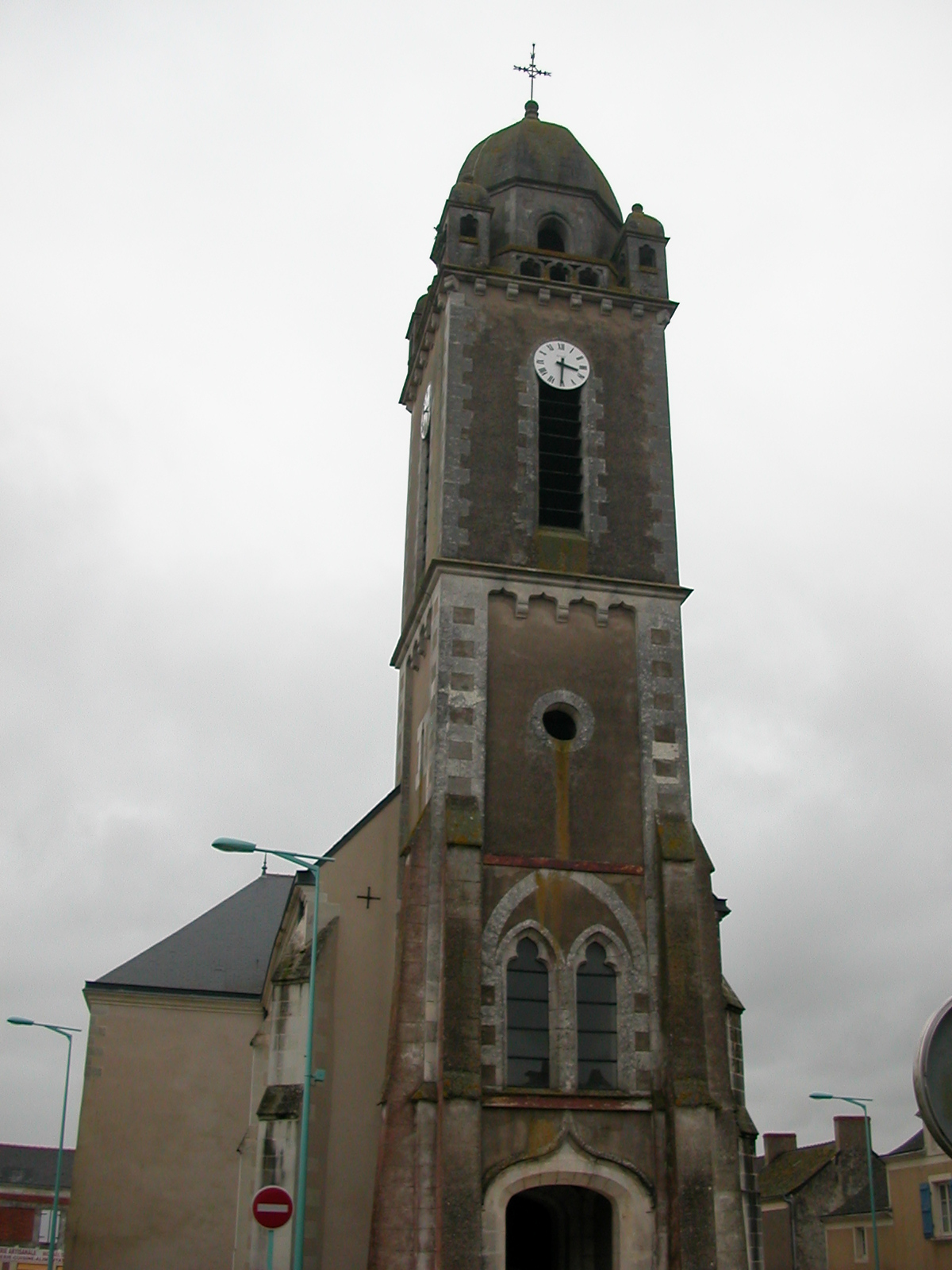
- The church in Anetz

- Coat of arms
- Location of Anetz
- Location within France Location within Pays de la Loire
- Coordinates: 47°22′59″N 1°06′06″W
- Country: France
- Region: Pays de la Loire
- Department: Loire-Atlantique
- Arrondissement: Châteaubriant-Ancenis
- Canton: Ancenis-Saint-Géréon
- Commune: Vair-sur-Loire
- Area^{1}: 14.83 km^{2} (5.73 sq mi)
- Highest elevation: 32 m (105 ft)
- Lowest elevation: 7 m (23 ft)
- Population (2022): 2,163
  - Density: 145.9/km^{2} (377.8/sq mi)
- Demonym(s): Anetziennes, Anetziens
- Time zone: UTC+01:00 (CET)
  - Summer (DST): UTC+02:00 (CEST)
- Postal code: 44150
- ^{1} French Land Register data, which excludes lakes, ponds, glaciers > 1 km^{2} (0.386 sq mi or 247 acres) and river estuaries.

Anetz (French pronunciation: [anɛ]; Breton: Arned) is a former commune in the Loire-Atlantique department in western France. On 1 January 2016, it was merged into the new commune of Vair-sur-Loire.

== Population ==
Historical population

Year	Pop.	±% p.a.
1793	908	—
1821	1,260	+1.18%
1846	1,157	−0.34%
1872	890	−1.00%
1901	786	−0.43%
1926	630	−0.88%
1946	654	+0.19%
1962	604	−0.50%

Year	Pop.	±% p.a.
1968	687	+2.17%
1975	955	+4.82%
1982	1,211	+3.45%
1990	1,285	+0.74%
1999	1,367	+0.69%
2006	1,449	+0.84%
2022	2,163	+2.54%

Source: EHESS and INSEE

== Sights ==
Le Château du Plessis de Vair

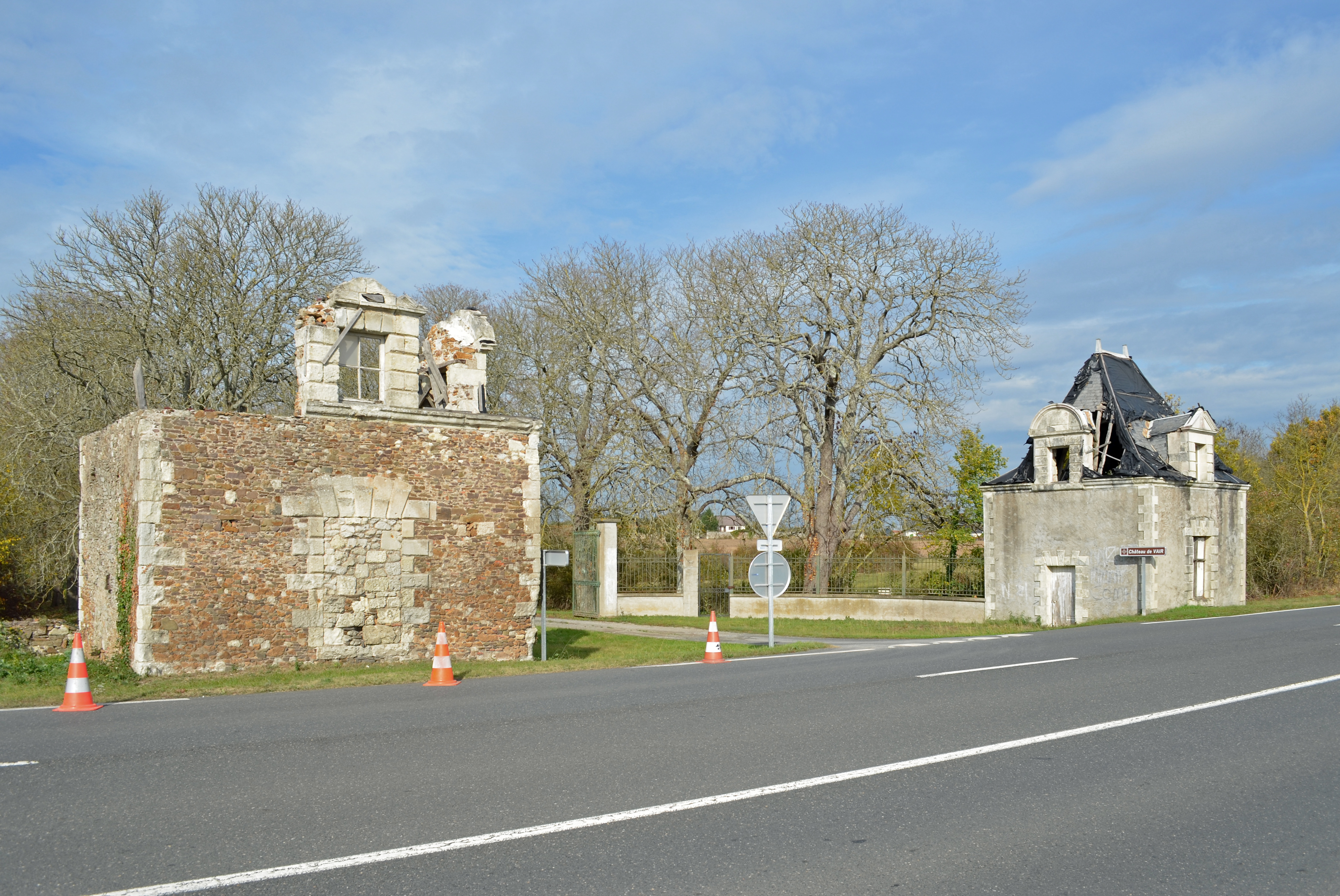

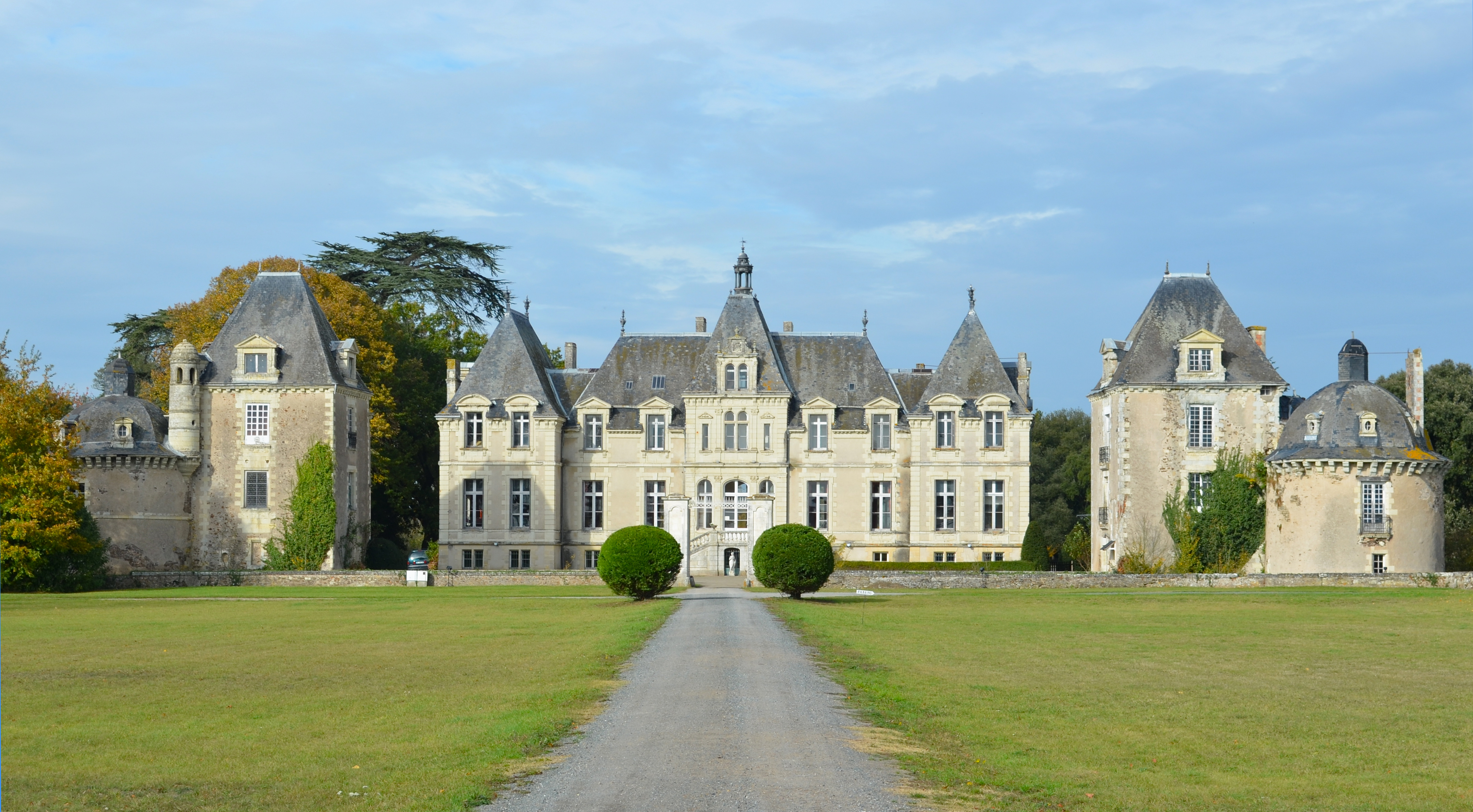

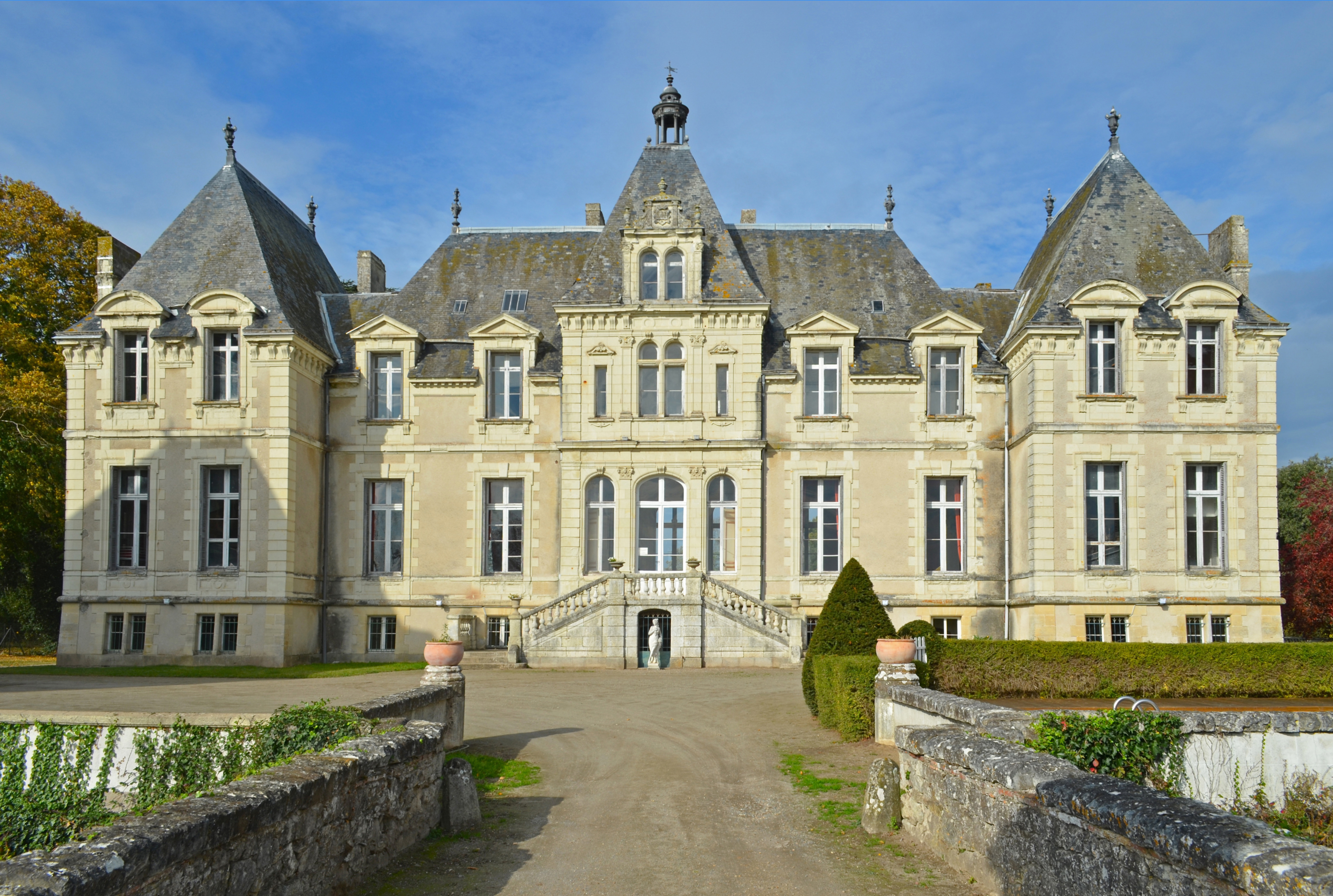

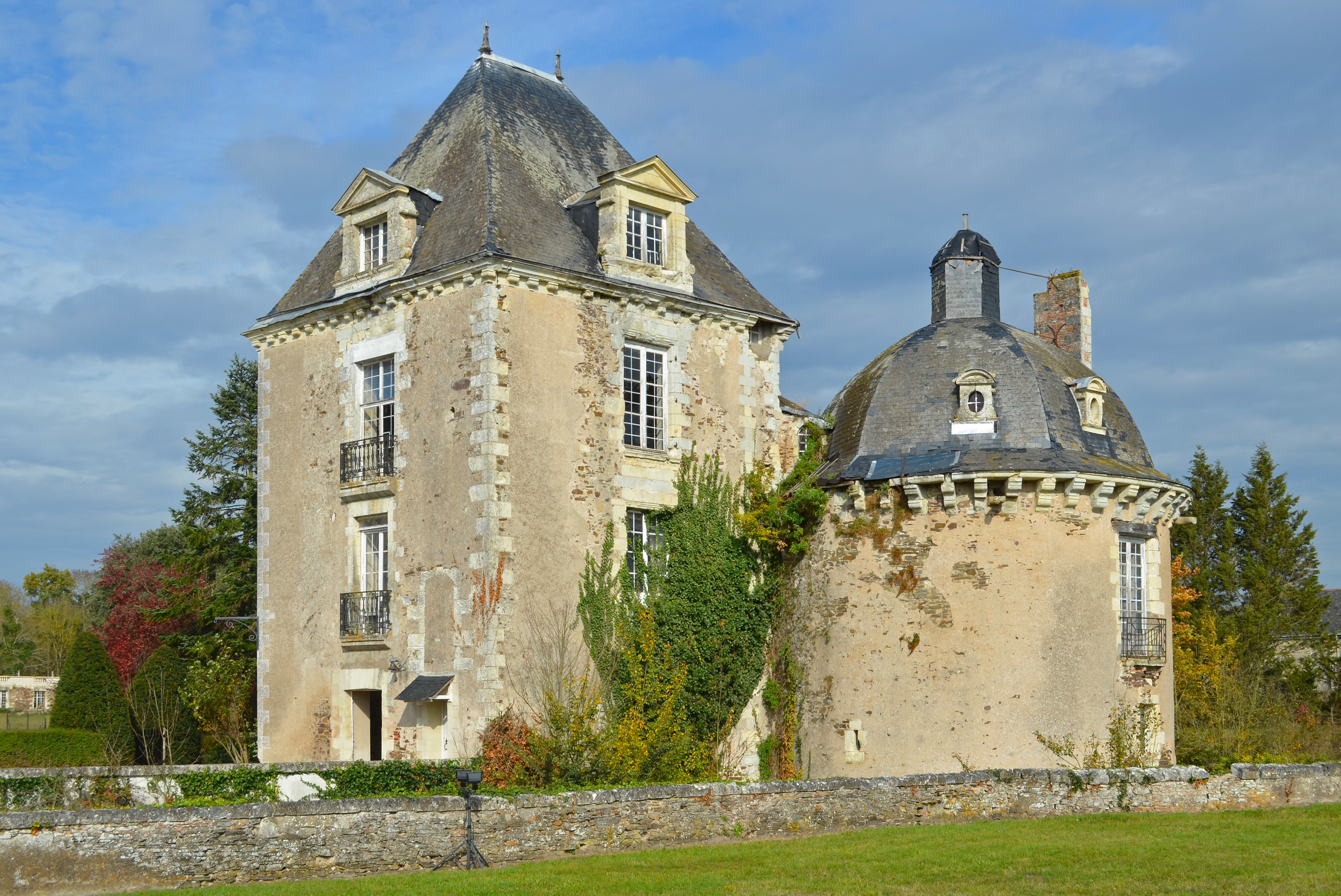

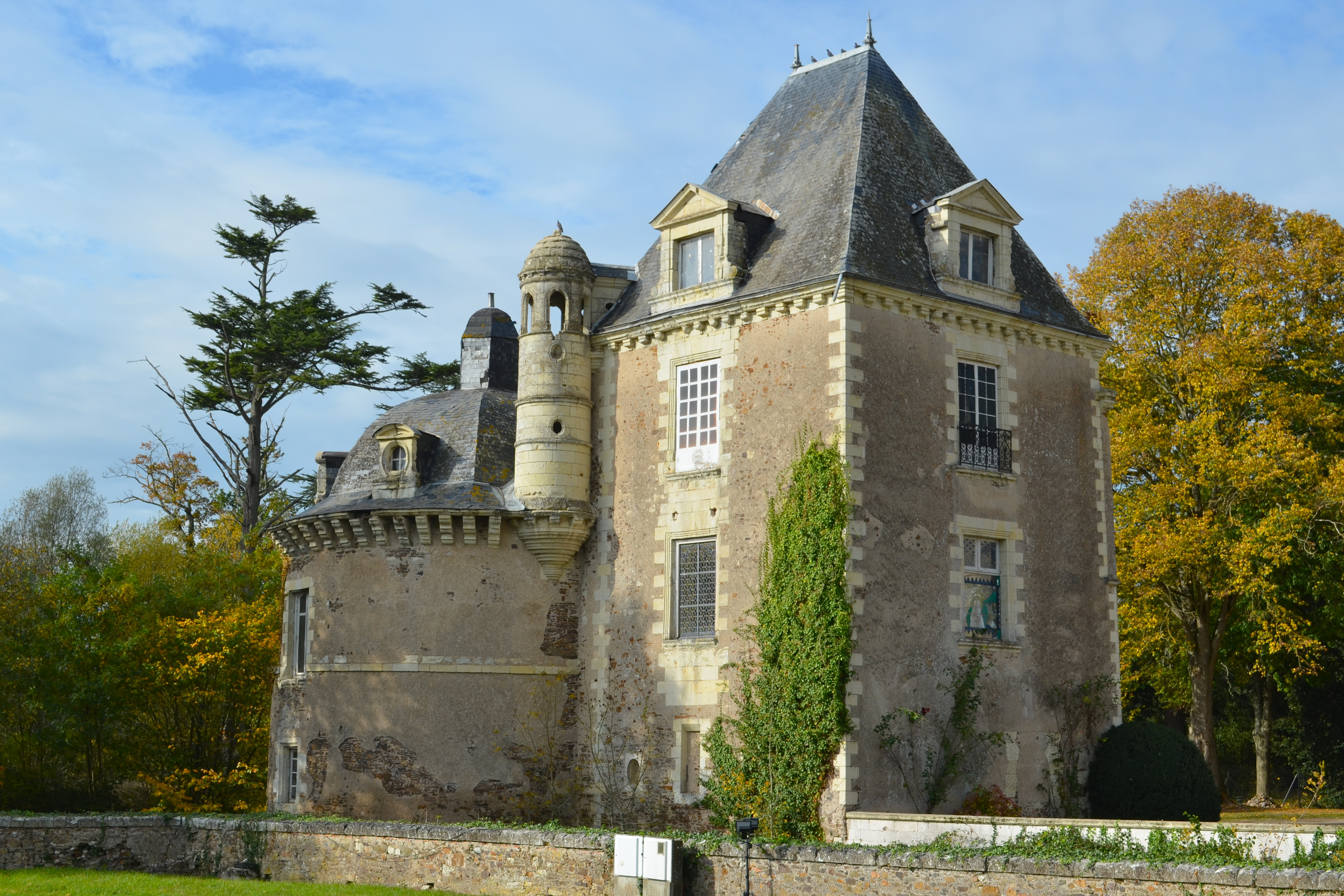

== See also ==
- Communes of the Loire-Atlantique department
