= Ciocchi Del Monte =

Ciocchi Del Monte is an Italian aristocratic family and Italian surname. Notable people with the surname include:

- Giovanni Maria Ciocchi del Monte - Pope Julius III
- Innocenzo Ciocchi Del Monte - a notorious cardinal

== See also ==
- Ciocchi
- del Monte (surname)
