= Parlement of Rennes =

Law building in western France

Coordinates: 48.1128°N 1.6778°W

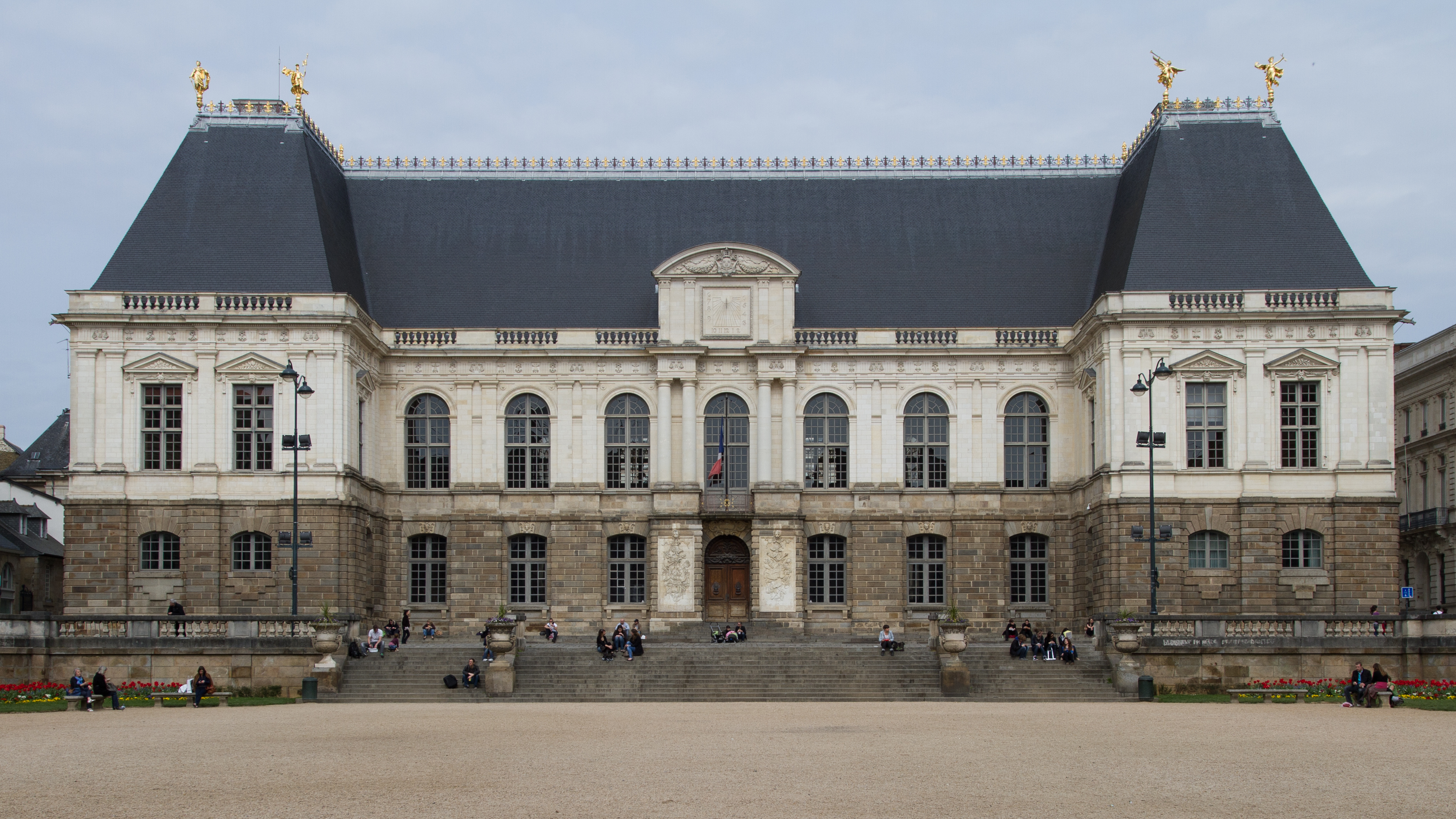
Façade of the palace of Parlement of Rennes

The Parlement of Rennes or Parlement of Brittany (Parlement de Bretagne, Breujoù Breizh) was one of the parlements, a court of justice under the French Ancien Régime, with its seat at Rennes. The last building to house the Parlement still stands and now houses the Rennes Court of Appeal, the natural successor of the Parlement.

== Parlements under the Ancien Régime ==
As with all the parlements before they were abolished in 1789, that of Brittany was a sovereign court of justice, principally listening to appeals of sentences issued by lower jurisdictions. The Parlements also possessed limited legislative powers and asserted some autonomy with respect to the royal prerogative.

The nobles of Brittany were keen to defend the rights of the province, known as the "Breton liberties", maintained under the treaty of union with France. They were determined to exercise these powers, and to play a big part in the life of the Parlement and consequently in the life of the whole province. This resistance to royal powers, involving the defending of its institutions and the privileges of the nobility, was widespread. Composed of similar members with many interests in common, the Estates of Brittany were invariably united with the Parlement of Brittany in defence of their rights.

== History ==
- 1485: Duke Francis II establishes a sovereign parlement at Vannes, first sitting in the autumn.
- 1532: The Parlement is cancelled by a special tribunal of Charles VIII, after which, all appeals are judged by the Parlement of Paris contributing to delays in the restoration of a sovereign court in the province.
- March 1553: Recreation of the Parlement of Brittany, sitting alternately at Rennes (August to October) and Nantes (February to April).
- August 2, 1554: First meeting at Rennes, followed by the second one at Nantes on February 4, 1555
- June 1557: Meeting twice a year, but only at Nantes. The meetings are divided between the Grand Chamber and the Inquiry Chamber. Sixty judges take part.
- 1561: Meeting solely at Rennes, at the convent of the Cordeliers.
- December 1575: Creation of the criminal room, the Tournelle
- September 1580: Creation of the Repeal Chamber, where appeals against sentences of the Parlement itself were heard.
- 1591: Beginning of extended meetings, but with no increase in payments.
- March 20, 1598: Duke Philippe-Emmanuel of Lorraine grants an amnesty for the judges of the Parlement who established a court at Nantes in 1589.
- 1599-1600: Ban on magistrates meeting in August
- 1578: Rennes is permitted to raise taxes for the construction of a new Parlement building - notably a tax on cider jars.
- July 1600: The meetings become twice-yearly again, February to July and August to January.
- September 15, 1618: First stone laid for the new building
- 1631: Conflict with Cardinal Richelieu after the restoration of mooring fees.
- January 16, 1655: The new building officially opened by the oldest of the presidents of the Parlement
- January 22, 1668: Creation of the Upper Chamber of the nobility of Brittany
- September 18, 1675: Louis XIV transfers the Parlement to Vannes to punish Rennes for participating in the Stamp Duty Revolt
- February 1, 1690: First meeting after the Parlement returns to Rennes
- February 1704: Creation of an Appeal Chamber for matters concerning water and forests.
- March 1724: A single annual meeting from November to August. Creation of a chamber to be assembled during the summer vacation. A second Inquiry Chamber was created, as well as a second Repeal Chamber.
- July 15, 1769: Parlement restored after three years' suspension by the military governor, Emmanuel Armand de Vignerot.
- September 1771: Parlement closed by Louis XV on the advice of René Nicolas de Maupeou
- December 1774: Parlement recalled on the accession of Louis XVI
- 1788: Strong opposition of the Parlement of Brittany to the edicts setting up the new large administrative areas of France. It refuses to name any representatives to the États Généraux.
- 1789: Last meeting.
- February 3, 1790: Legal existence ended, though the closure by the National Assembly was never ratified by the Parlement itself, which met on the same day to declare the decision “null and void forever” (Thesis Toublanc).
- 1804: The Parlement building began to house the Court of Appeals of Rennes
- February 4–5, 1994: The building was destroyed by fire during a fishermen's strike.
- 1999: After five years of restoration the building once again began to house the Court of Appeals

== Judicial competence ==
The foremost responsibilities of the Parlement of Brittany were the processing of appeals against judgements in civil matters rather than criminal matters. It had to instruct and to judge across wide-ranging areas of litigation, and question all that which may have escaped the attention, for various reasons, of the lower provincial jurisdictions.

=== Main responsibilities ===
- Matters relating to the "privileges, prerogatives and pre-eminences" of the barons of Brittany
- Matters concerning the bishops and the chapters of their cathedrals
- Matters concerning royal officers and the clergy
- Matters arising within the Parlement itself
- Abuse or embezzlement by clerks, ushers and prosecutors
- Privileges of cities, towns, communities and parishes
- Regulations for fairs and markets
- Questions of general policy
- Vested interest
- Disputes of judges relating to their workloads
- Conflicts of jurisdiction
- Taxation disputes
- Questions of choice of place of judgement where the matters may cover many jurisdictions.
- Questions regarding guardianship of children or the insane

=== Appeals ===
- Appeals as a result of "an incompetent judge"
- Appeals of royal jurisdictions (outside of tribunals) concerning ownership of land
- Appeals as a result of "denial of justice" and of "dismissal"
- Appeals against sentences passed by the Provost of the University of Nantes
- Appeals as a result of the jurisdiction of the chapter-house
- Appeals as a result of abuse
- Appeals as a result of legal confiscation or permission to confiscate
- Appeals against leases and auctions of buildings
- Appeals against judgments regarding the beneficiaries of wills
- Appeals against consular and arbitration sentences

=== Civil process ===
According to a sample of the Parlement's judgments compiled by Séverine Debordes-Lissillour, its judgments (excluding those in a few trials that lasted more than ten years) had an average delay between the initial sentence and the decision of two or three years at the beginning of the 18th century, but this increased steadily until it was more than five years at the end of the century. Within that same sample of judgments, the Parlement confirmed the judgment in 60 per cent of cases, but was divided in 30 per cent of cases, some being the object of an "evocation before the court," while the remaining 10 per cent of judgements were left unfinished as “having to be done right”). More than half of the procedures concerned questions of succession, of property and of obligations.

== Administrative competence ==
The Parlement of Brittany possessed many administrative prerogatives, such as guardianship of parishes and control of policing. The contentions and complaints that it processed allowed it to be fairly well informed about general difficulties justifying the sentences passed or overriding the strict judicial framework. All the same, royal orders and edicts could require implementation more or less immediately.

Parishes had to ask for the Parlement's agreement when they wanted to raise money for their own needs (repairs, for example). Forty parishes asked for such decisions during a single term in the year 1693. The parish rector had to publicise any judgments.

One of the innovations of the laws of August 16 and August 24, 1790, following the abolition of the Parlements, was the separation of the judicial and the administrative courts.

== The Parlement building ==
Plans were drawn by the city architect of Rennes, German Gaultier and reviewed by Salomon de Brosse (designer of the facades). The Parlement of Brittany decided to site the palace in the heart of the city, where it had sat ever since 1655.

The building was restored following severe fire damage on February 5, 1994, an event linked to violent demonstrations by local fishermen. The building was adapted to the requirements of the 21st century, and the Court of Appeal of Rennes was able to resume its activities there within five years.

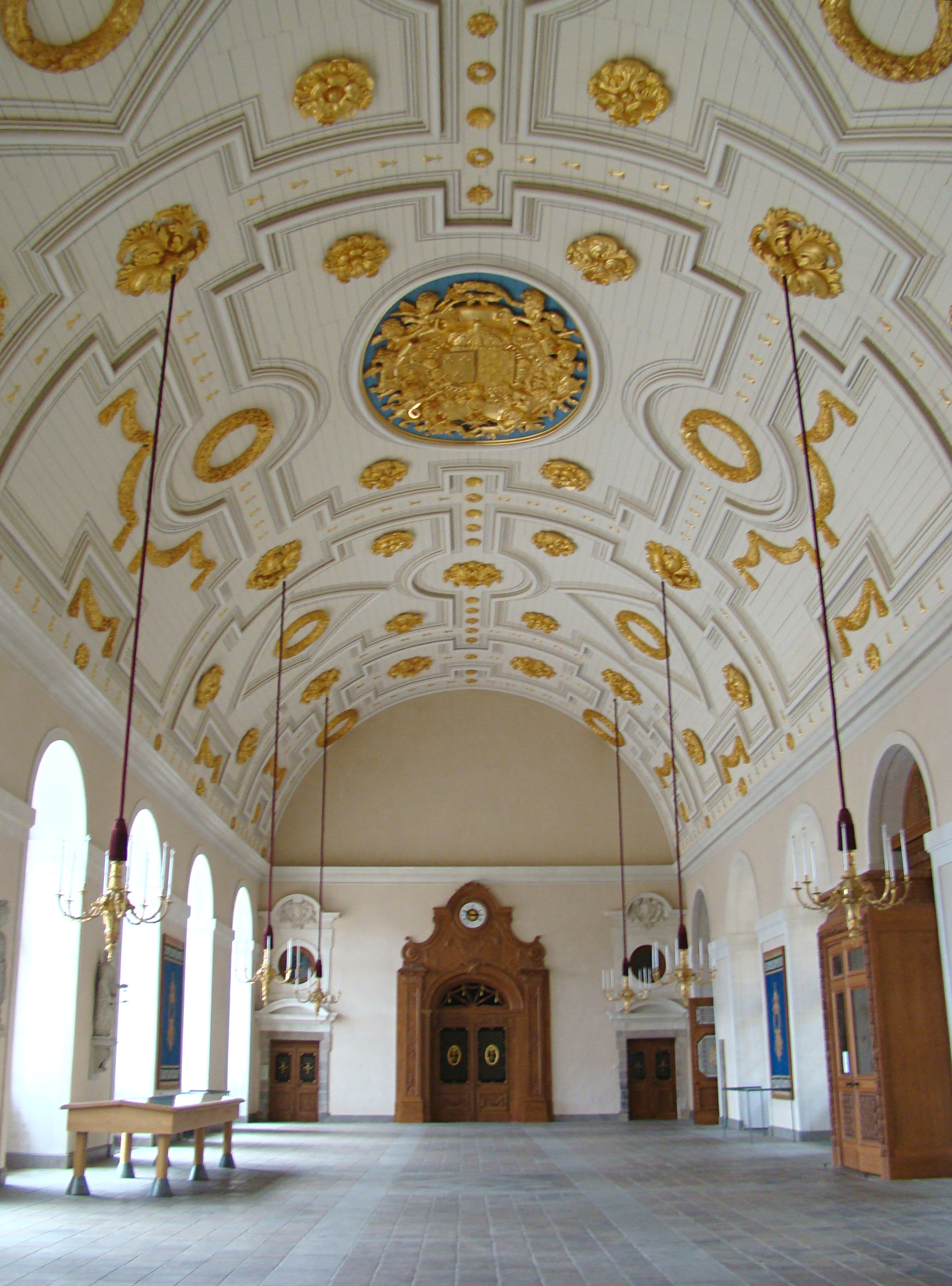
The waiting room

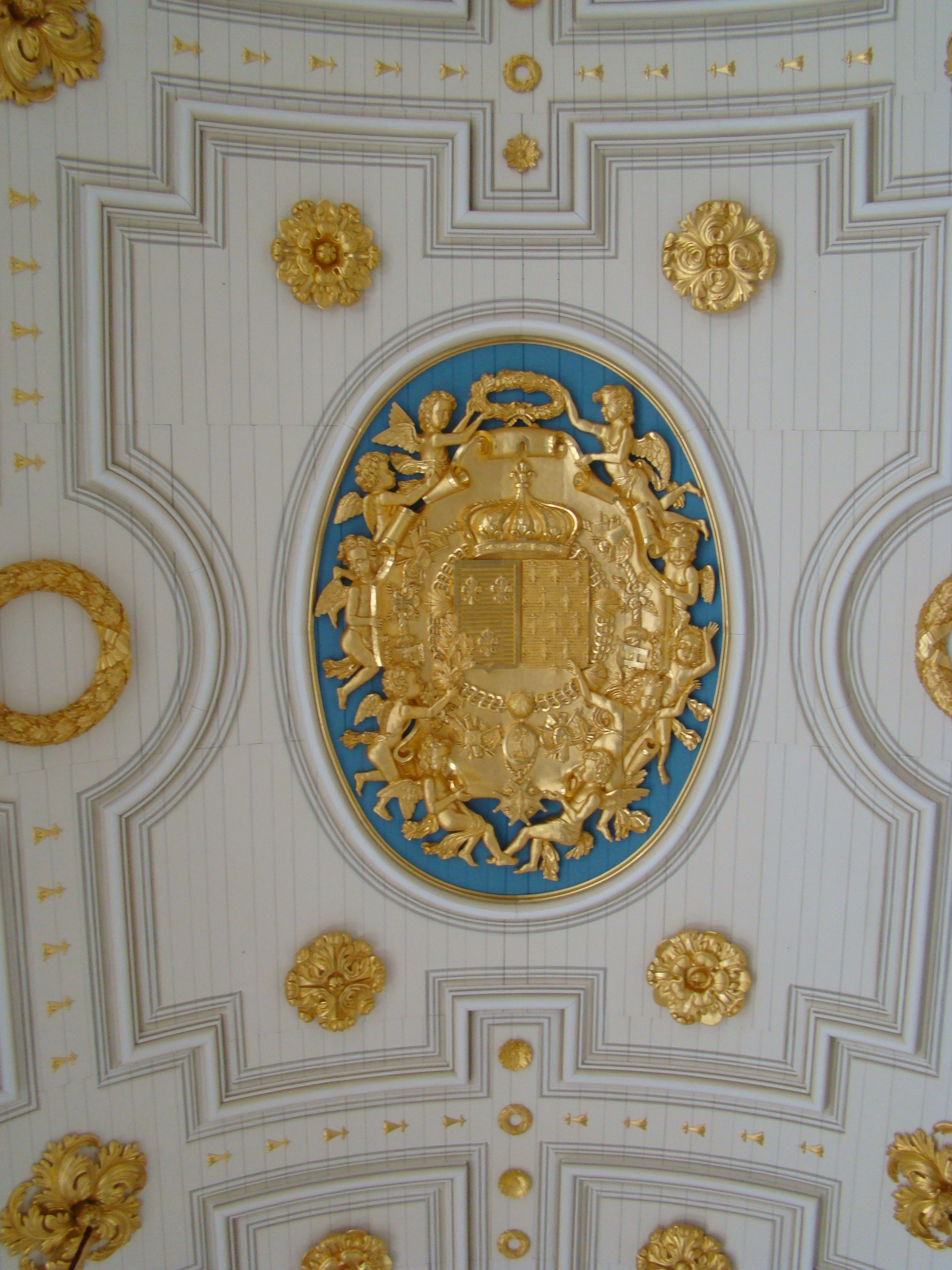
Ceiling of the waiting room

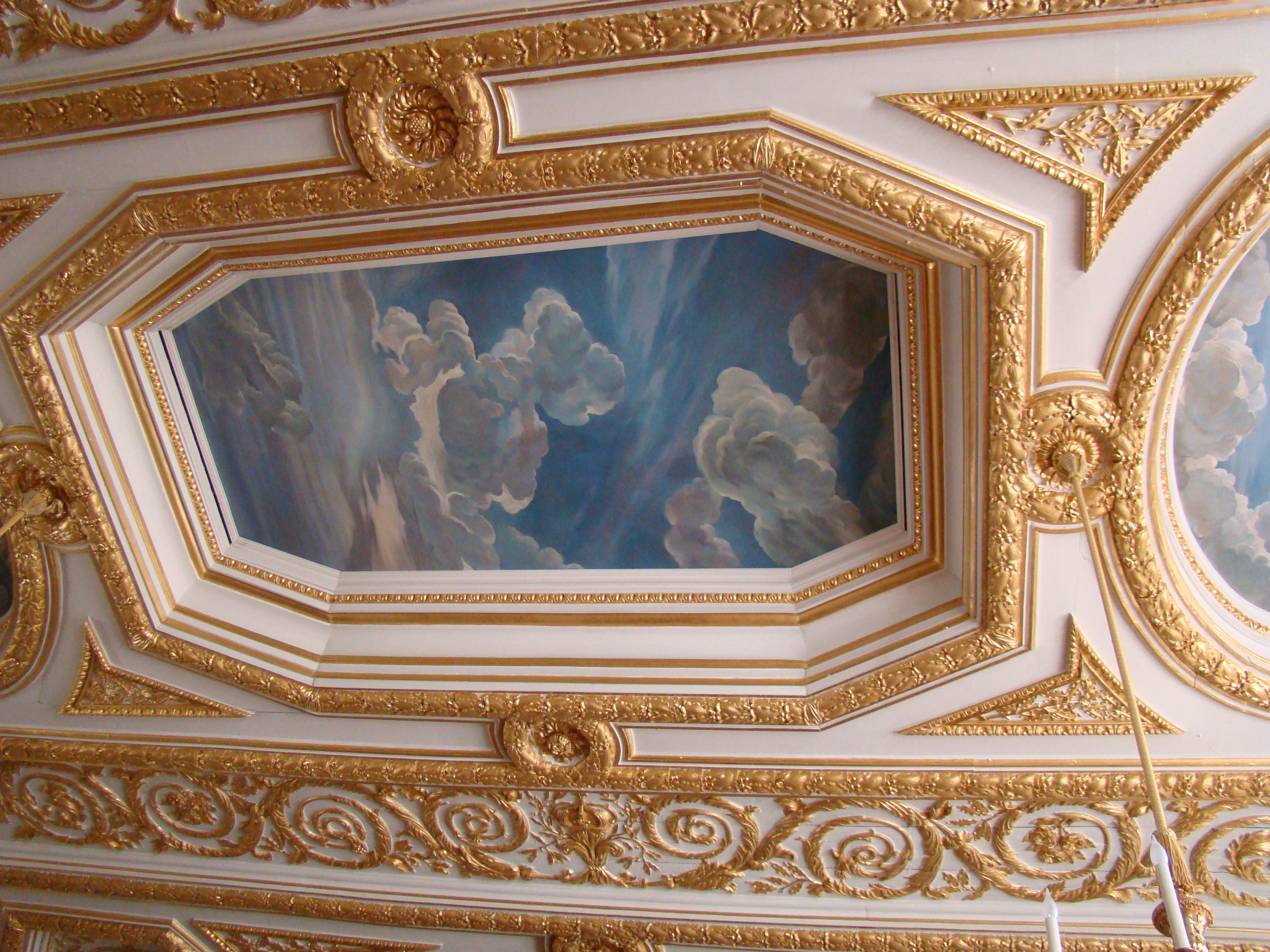
Detail of a painting in the Court of Assizes

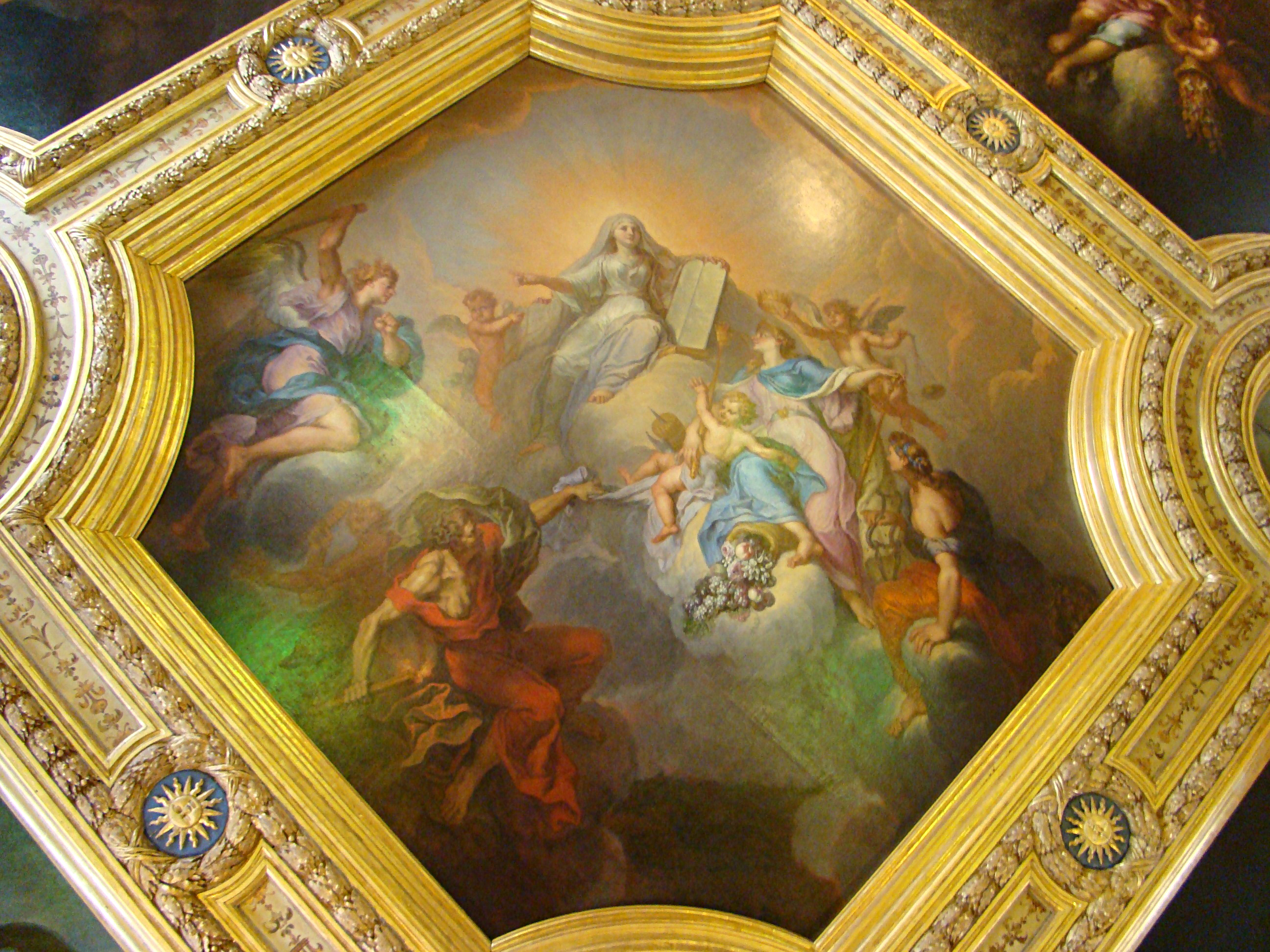
From the ceiling in the Court of Appeals - The Triumph of Justice

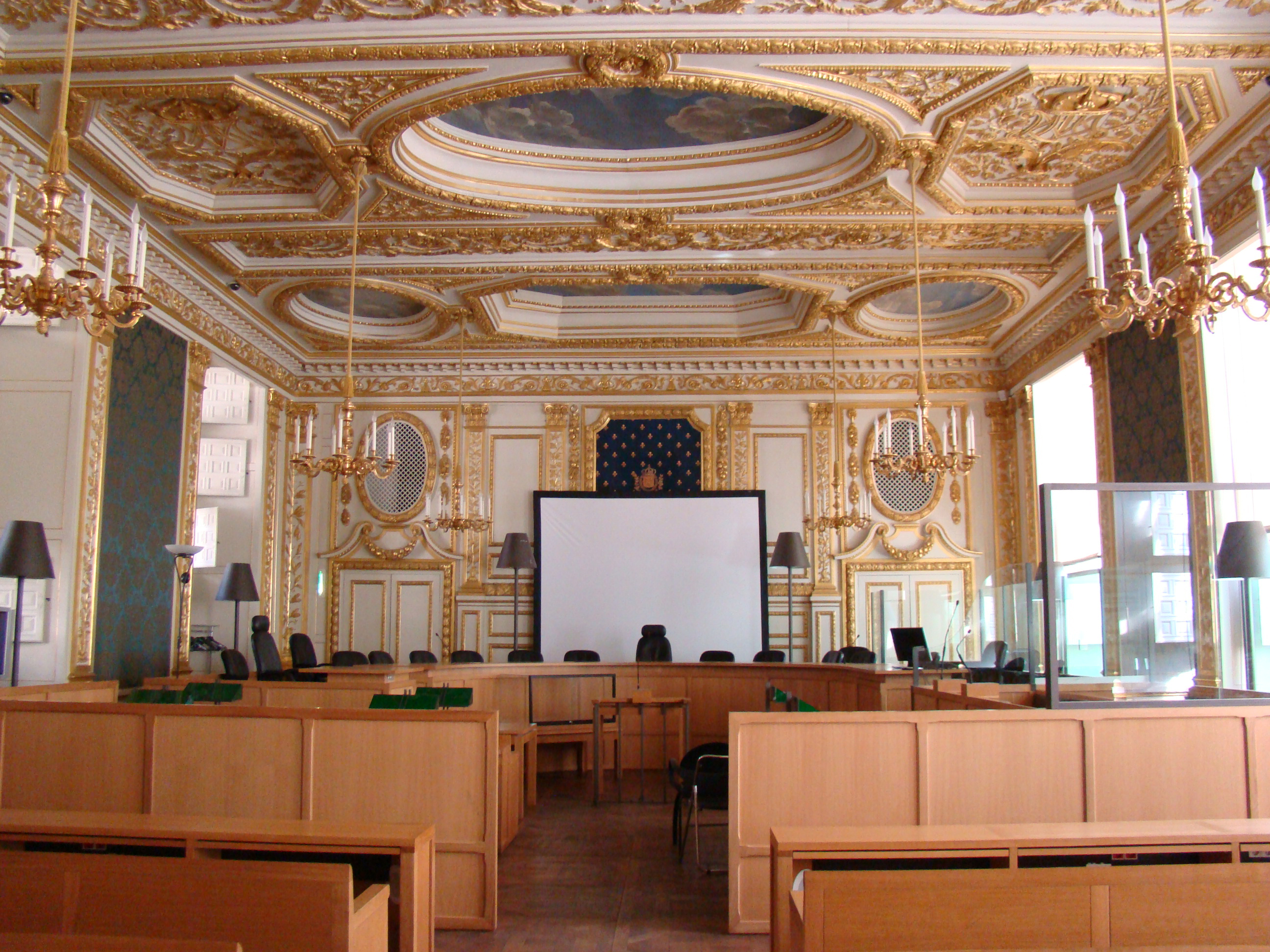
The Court of Assizes

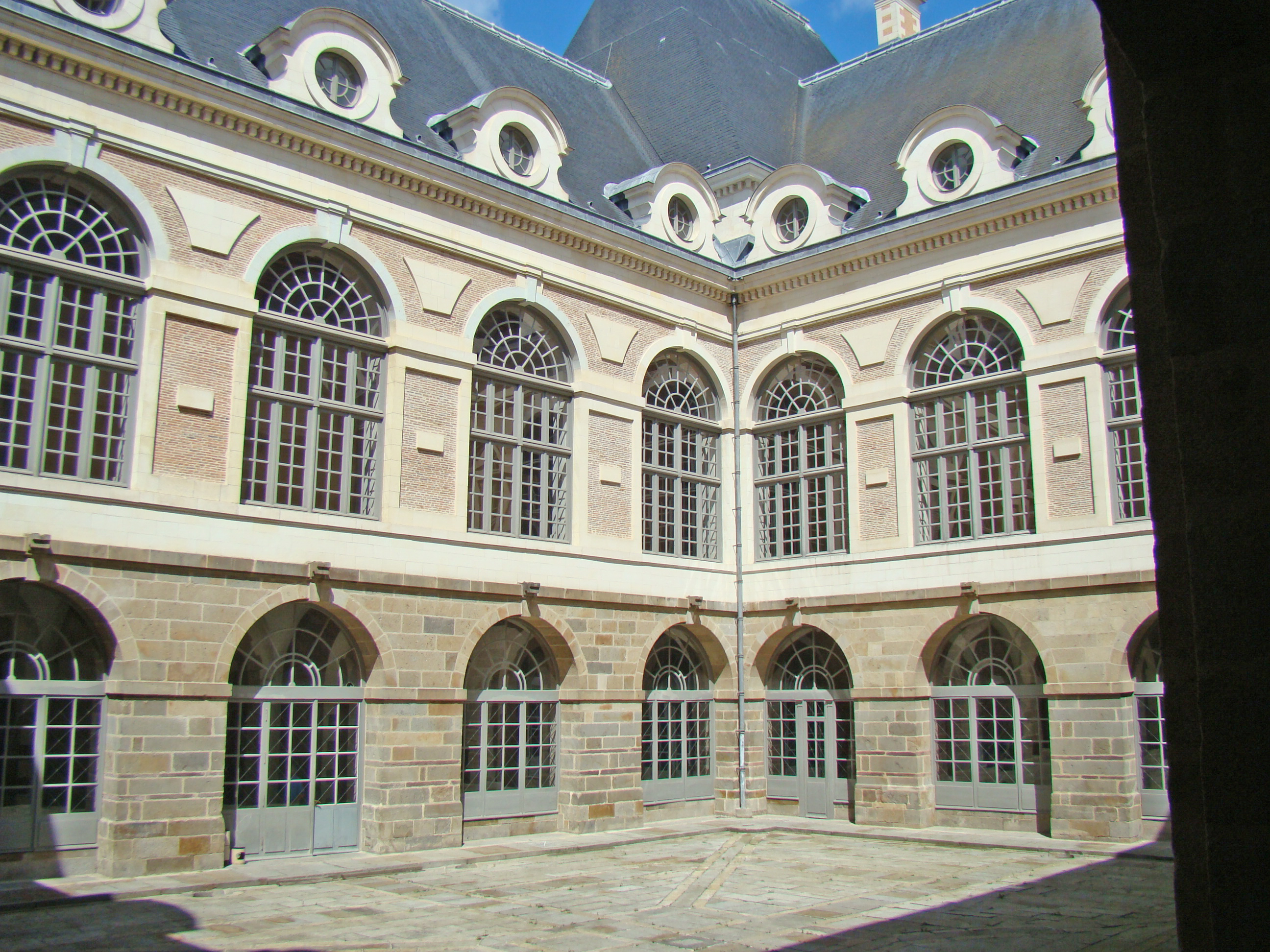
Interior courtyard

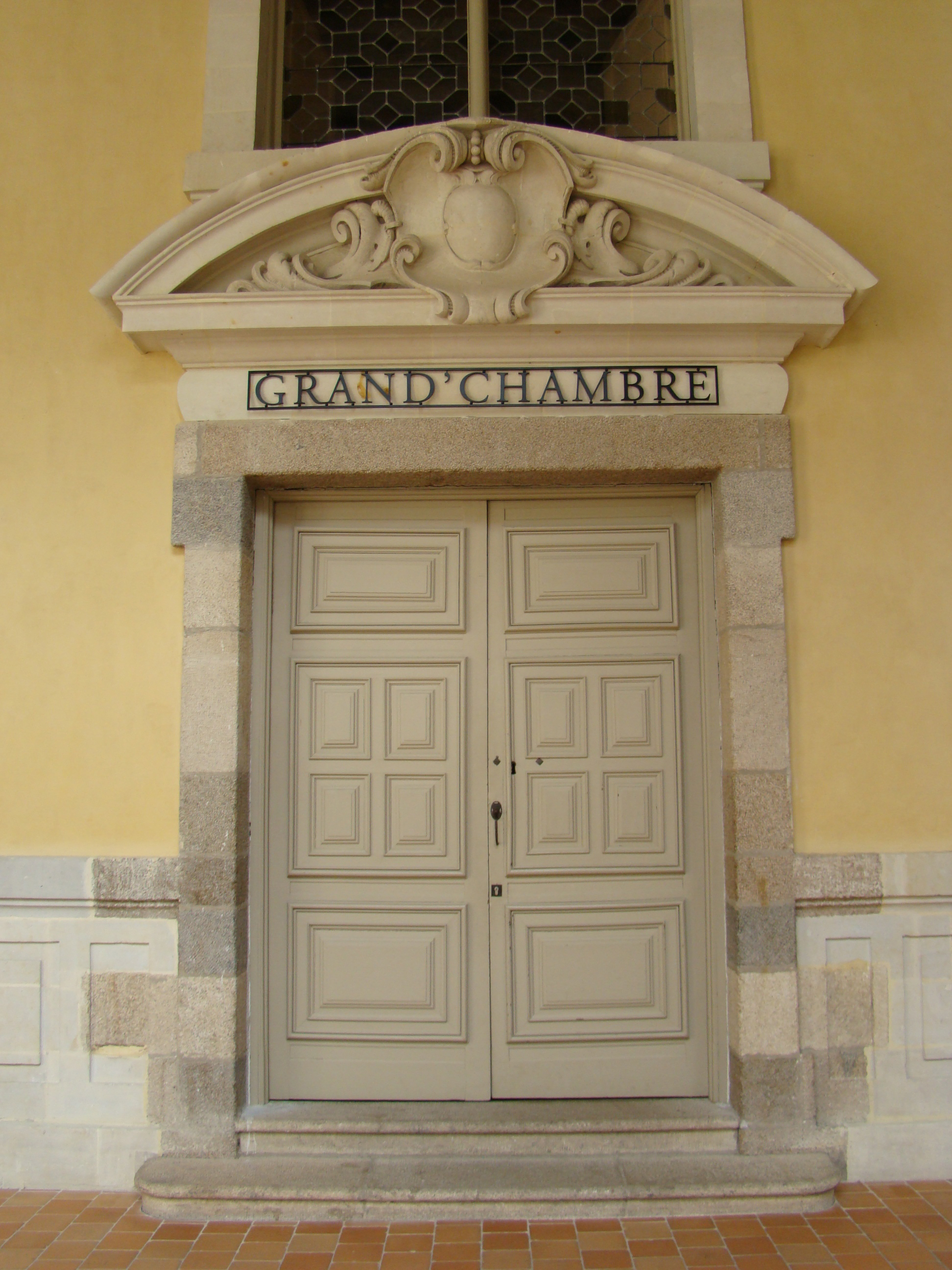
Entrance to the Grand Chamber

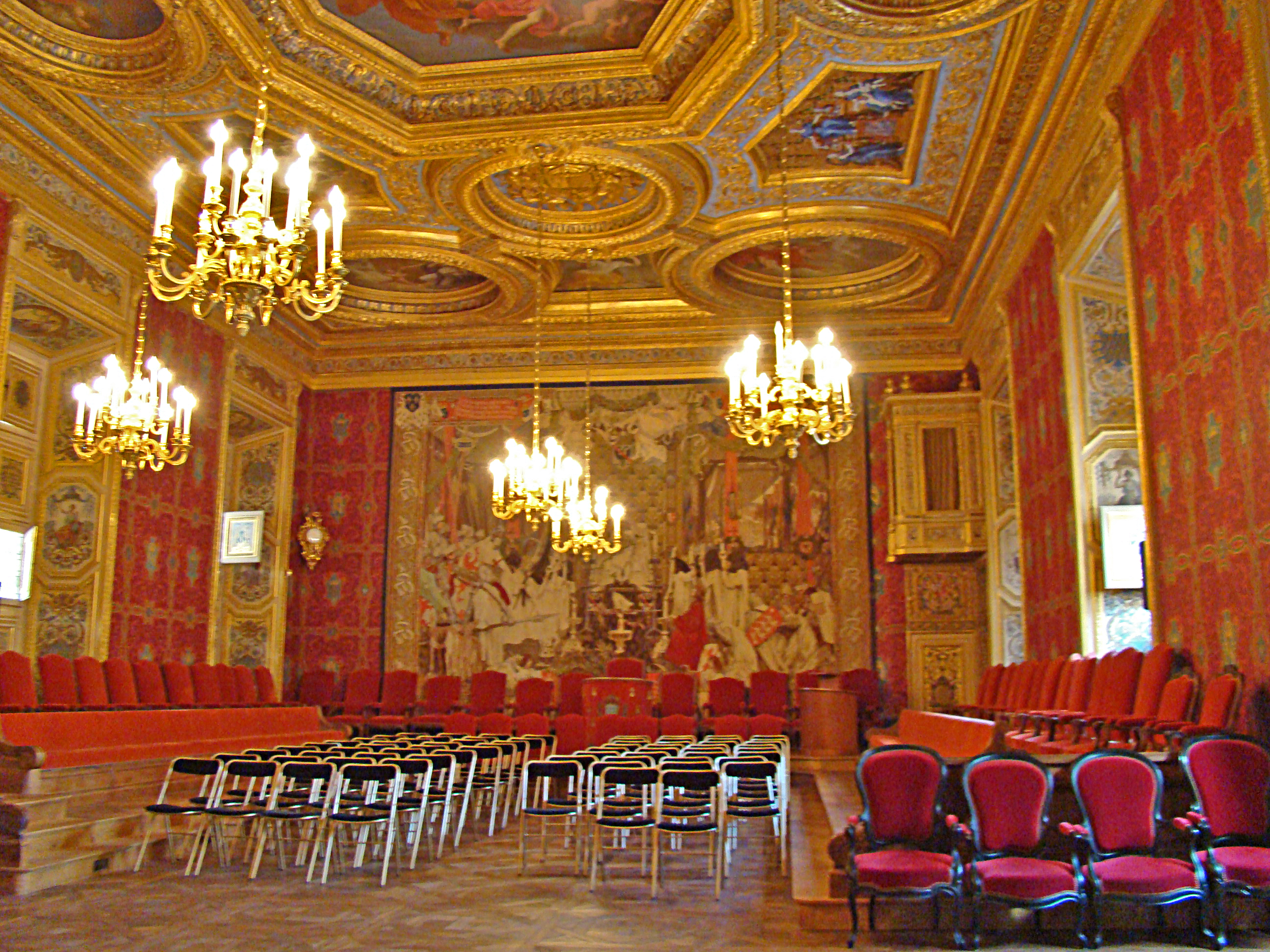
The Grand Chamber

== See also ==
- History of Brittany

== Bibliography ==
- Hurt, John J. "The Parlement of Brittany and the Crown: 1665-1675." French Historical Studies (1966): 411-433. in JSTOR

=== In French ===
- (in French) Henri Carré, Le Parlement de Bretagne après la ligue (1598-1610), Maison Quantin, Paris, 1888
- (in French) Ernest Texier, Des appels du parlement de Bretagne au parlement de Paris, 1906
- (in French) Arthur Le Moy, Le parlement de Bretagne et le pouvoir royal au XVIII siécle, Burdin, Angers, 1909
- (in French) J. de La Martinière, « Le parlement de Bretagne sous les rois de France », Annales de Bretagne et des pays de l'Ouest|Annales de Bretagne, 1930, p. 219
- (in French) Jean Egret, Louis XV et l'opposition parlementaire (1715-1774), Armand Colin, Paris, 1970
- (in French) Frédéric Saulnier, Le Parlement de Bretagne (1554-1790), Imprimerie de la Manutention, Mayenne, 1991
- (in French) Marie-Laure Legay, Les États provinciaux dans la construction de l'État moderne aux XVII siécle et XVIII siécle, Droz, Genève, 2001
- This article is based on the equivalent article from the French Wikipedia, consulted on November 28, 2007.
