= Joué-sur-Erdre =

Joué-sur-Erdre Jóae/Jouë/Joueu (Gallo) Yaoued (Breton)
- Commune
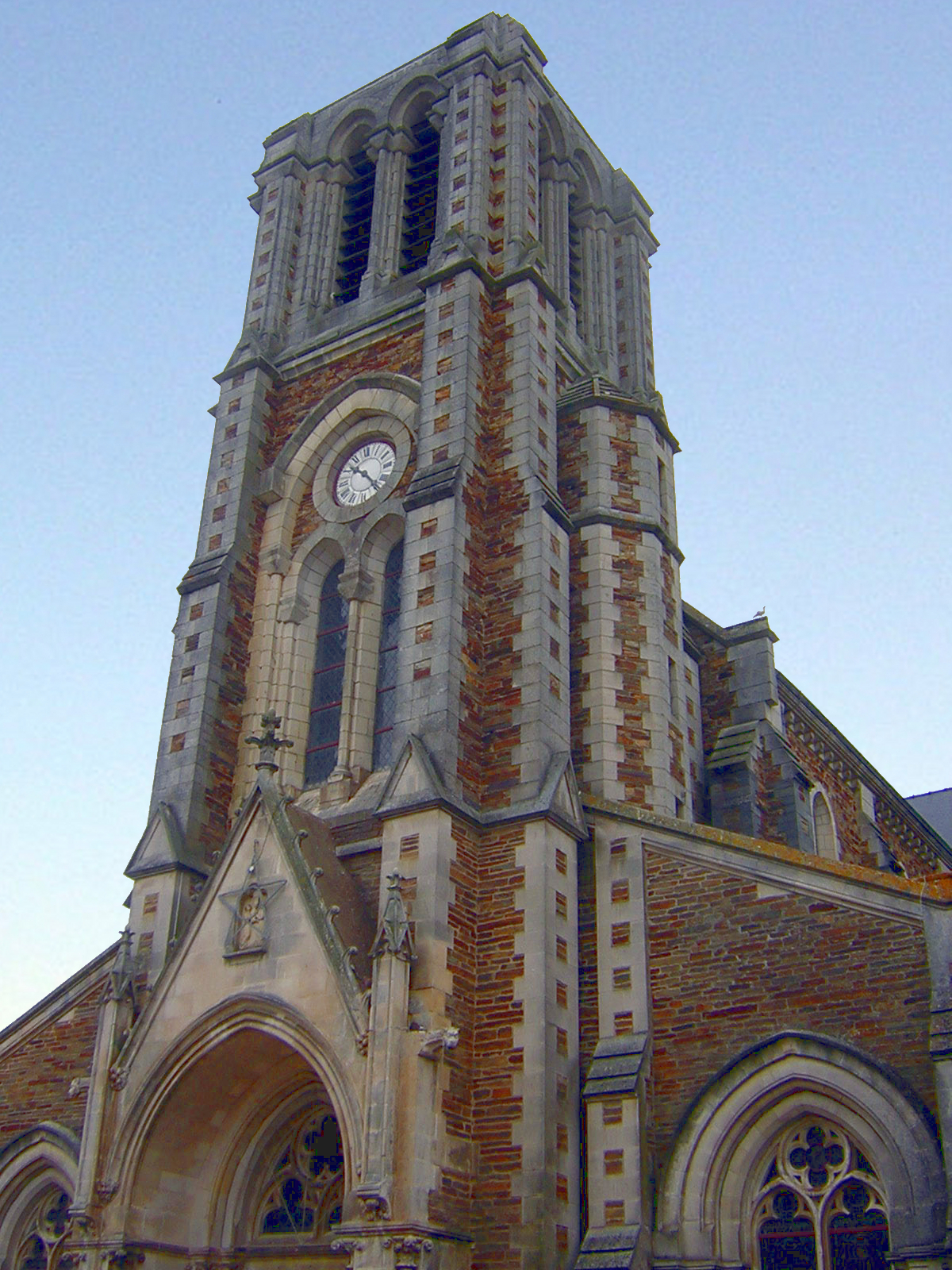

- Coat of arms
- Location of Joué-sur-Erdre
- Location within France Location within Pays de la Loire
- Coordinates: 47°29′47″N 1°25′08″W
- Country: France
- Region: Pays de la Loire
- Department: Loire-Atlantique
- Arrondissement: Châteaubriant-Ancenis
- Canton: Nort-sur-Erdre
- Intercommunality: Pays d'Ancenis

Government
  - Mayor (2020–2026): Jean-Pierre Belleil
- Area^{1}: 54.53 km^{2} (21.05 sq mi)
- Elevation: 37 m (121 ft)
- Highest elevation: 66 m (217 ft)
- Lowest elevation: 7 m (23 ft)
- Population (2023): 2,797
  - Density: 51.29/km^{2} (132.8/sq mi)
- Time zone: UTC+01:00 (CET)
  - Summer (DST): UTC+02:00 (CEST)
- INSEE/Postal code: 44077 /44440
- ^{1} French Land Register data, which excludes lakes, ponds, glaciers > 1 km^{2} (0.386 sq mi or 247 acres) and river estuaries.

Joué-sur-Erdre (French pronunciation: [ʒwe syʁ ɛʁdʁ], literally Joué on Erdre; Gallo: Jóae, Jouë or Joueu, Breton: Yaoued) is a commune in the Loire-Atlantique department in western France.

== Etymology ==
Joué is first mentioned as Joseio in 1186.

It belongs to the long list of Gallo-Romance toponyms such as Joué, Jouy, Gouy and Occitano-Catalan Gaujac having as origin Gaudiacu cf. Joué-en-Charnie (Sarthe, Gaudiaco 1186) or Joué-Étiau (Maine-et-Loire, Gaudiacus AB 7th, etc. It is a compound of Gaudi(us), a Christian name based on gaudius "joy" and the Gaulish (Celtic) suffix -acum "place, property" cf. Welsh -og.

Its Breton name is Yaoued. The Breton name of the people from Yaoued is Yaouedad (for men) and Yaouedadez (for women).

Sur-Erdre ("Upon-the-Erdre") was added in the 19th century and it refers to the river name Erdre, itself from a Celtic *ered "running stream". The river is mentioned as Erda in the 11th century.

== Geography ==
=== Situation ===
Joué-sur-Erdre is at 47°29′47″N 1°25′08″W, in western France in Loire-Atlantique. The commune is 29 km north-west of Ancenis and 30 km north-east of Nantes.

The commune is, as the crow flies, 318 km of Paris.

Joué-sur-Erdre in Loire-Atlantique.

==== Relief ====
The highest point in the city is 66 meters above the sea level, the deepest one is seven meters above. The mean elevation is 37 meters above the sea level.

==== Hydrology ====
The commune is crossed by the Erdre and the Isac rivers.

The lake Vioreau was extended in 1835 to reach 200 ha.

== Climate ==
=== Global warming ===
Although the highest point of the commune is 66 meters above the sea level, the mean level is 37 meters. That is to say that the commune is concerned by the global warming and the elevation of the sea level.

Joué-sur-Erdre is among the 69,68% communes concerned by this elevation.

== Town planning ==
=== Urban morphology ===
The commune is made up of the principal village and many other hamlets as Notre-Dame-des-Langueurs, la Demenure, la Mulonnière, Franchaud, la Cormerais, and la Gicquelière.

Map of Joué-sur-Erdre.

Map of la Demenure.

Map of la Mulonnière.

Map of la Gicquelière.

== Communications and transports ==
The RN 178, running from east/west, crosses Joué-sur-Erdre.

The hamlet of Gros Breil is crossed by the railroad.

The nearest airport is in Ancenis.

== Adjacent villages ==
Northwest: Abbaretz	North: La Meilleraye-de-Bretagne	Northeast: Riaillé
West: Saffré	Joué-sur-Erdre	East: Trans-sur-Erdre
Southwest: Nort-sur-Erdre	South: Les Touches	Southeast: Trans-sur-Erdre

== History ==
In the 9th century, to shield the country from Norman invasion waves, a fort called Alon was built on what is now known as Joué-sur-Erdre.

At the beginning of the 13th century, the castle of Vioreau and its neighbouring lands were called "Joué" referring to the lord who lived in, Hervé de Joué. In this time, Joué was the heart of the greatest seigniory near Nantes with a surface reaching twenty parishes in the 16th century. It was later assimilated in the Barony of Chateaubriant.

Two castles still exist in the parish, Lucinière and la Chauvelière. In the first one used to live the bishops of Nantes from the 15th to the 16th centuries. The castle of la Chauvelière used to belong to the Brittany chancellor.

On 13 August 1487, after the failure of the siege of Nantes (from 19 June to 6 August 1487) hold by the duc de Bretagne, King Charles VIII and Anne of Beaujeu encamped with their troops in Joué.

In 1592, during the Holy League, Joué-sur-Erdre and Nort-sur-Erdre hosted 12,000 French and Spanish troops headed by the Duke of Mercœur.

On 30 May 1847, the village took its current name of Joué-sur-Erdre.

== Economy ==
=== Employment ===
In 2017, the labor force reached 1,162 people. The unemployment rate of the village was 10.9%.

Distribution of jobs by domain of activity
	Farmers	Craftsmen, storekeepers, business managers	Cadre, Intellectual	Professions intermédiaires ('Intermediate occupations')	Employee	Blue-collar worker
Joué-sur-Erdre	2.7%	4.9%	11.4%	25.5%	28.1%	26.7%
National average	1.6%	6.7%	18.2%	26.0%	27.6%	19.9%

== Politics and administration ==
=== Political tendencies and results ===
==== French European Constitution referendum of 2005 ====
During the European Constitution referendum which took place on 29 May 2005, there were 40,39% voting "yes" and 59,61% voting "no". The abstention rate was 26,04%.

==== French presidential election of 2007 ====
During the first round Nicolas Sarkozy obtained 27.74% of the votes and Ségolène Royal obtained 25.12%. During the second round 53.06% of the votes were obtained by des voix furent remportées par Nicolas Sarkozy against 46.94% for Ségolène Royal. The participation rate was 86.48% (nationwide : 83.97%) and spoilt vote represented 3.75% of the electors (nationwide : 4.20%).

Detailed results

First round :

The first round was held on 22 April 2007:

	Party	Results	National average
Nicolas Sarkozy	Union pour un mouvement populaire	27.74%	31.18%
Ségolène Royal	Parti socialiste	25.12%	25.87%
François Bayrou	Union pour la démocratie française	19.97%	18.57%
Jean-Marie Le Pen	Front national	10.23%	10.44%
Olivier Besancenot	Ligue communiste révolutionnaire	4.91%	4.08%
Philippe de Villiers	Mouvement pour la France	3.44%	2.23%
Frédéric Nihous	Chasse, pêche, nature et traditions	2.21%	1.15%
José Bové	Independent	1.96%	1.32%
Dominique Voynet	Les Verts	1.88%	1.57%
Arlette Laguiller	Lutte ouvrière	1.72%	1.33%
Marie-George Buffet	Popular and antiliberal left	0.57%	1.93%
Gérard Schivardi	National committee for the reconquest of public utilities	0.25%	0.34%

The participation rate was 87.25% (national average 83.77%) and spoilt vote represented 1.37% of the votes (national average 1.44%).

Second round :

The second round was held on 6 May 2007:

	Party	Results	National average
Nicolas Sarkozy	Union pour un mouvement populaire	51.86%	53.06%
Ségolène Royal	Parti socialiste	48.14%	46.94%

==== French legislative election of 2007 ====
Joué-sur-Erdre is part of the Loire-Atlantique's 5th constituency.

During the second round Michel Ménard was elected.

2nd round
Candidate	Party	%	Votes
Michel Ménard	PS	51.11 %	36,891
Robert Diat	UMP	48.89 %	35,292

==== French municipal elections of 2008 ====
Joué-sur-Erdre's population is between 1500 and 2500 inhabitants, thus they elect 19 counsellors.

The new mayor is Jean-Pierre Belleil.

Detailed results

First round :

The first round was on 9 March 2008:

	List	Votes
Christian Jadeau		553
Isabelle Rigaud		537
Hervé Lubert	DVD	533

Second round :

The second round was held on 16 March 2008:

	List	Votes
Yves Boube		631
Christelle Fribourg		578
Jean-Pierre Belleil		566
Michel Jamet		559
Frédéric Simonneau		547
Yves Forget		542
Daniel Godard		538
Roselyne Voisin		536
Guy Petard		528
Hervé Ducleux		519
Sylvie Leray		512
Diana Praud		504
Vincent Martin		504
Olivier Blais		494
Yannick Rabin		489
Stanislas Hardy		479

=== List of mayors ===
Mayors
Term	Name	Political Party	Notes
1800 - 1809	Eugène François Roussel		
1810–1814	François Lecudon		Notary.
1815 - 13 December 1820	Aimé-Désiré Anneau		Notary. Died on 13 December 1820 at age 38.
1821 - January 1833	François Priou		Geometrician
February 1833 - August 1840	Jacques-Désiré Marbin		
August 1840 - June - 1844	Pierre Guillaume Louis Calice		Châtelain de l'Auvinière
November 1844 - September 1870	Marc Jacques Pierre Nouais		
May 1871 - 1878	Jean-Baptiste Nouais		
March 1878 - ?	Amaury de Goyon Matignon de Marcé		Marquis. Mayor during 1881, 1886 and 1891 censuses.
?	Mr Nouais		Mayor during 1896 and 1901 censuses.
?	Amaury de Goyon	?	Marquis. Mayor during 1906 census and in 1918.
?	?	?	?
? - March 2001	Isabelle Le Gualès de Mézaubran		
March 2001 - March 2008	Hervé Lubert	DVD	
March 2008 - in office	Jean-Pierre Belleil		Farmer

=== Environmental politics ===
The allée de Chênes ("alley of Oaks") of the château de Lucinière, also called "la Grande Avenue", is a classified environmental site since 9 February 1949. It shelters tercentenaries oaks.

== Population ==
Historical population

Year	Pop.	±% p.a.
1793	1,943	—
1806	2,109	+0.63%
1821	2,452	+1.01%
1831	2,709	+1.00%
1841	2,520	−0.72%
1851	2,580	+0.24%
1861	2,684	+0.40%
1872	2,664	−0.07%
1881	2,831	+0.68%
1891	2,901	+0.24%
1901	2,804	−0.34%
1911	2,806	+0.01%
1921	2,528	−1.04%

Year	Pop.	±% p.a.
1931	2,354	−0.71%
1946	2,112	−0.72%
1954	2,029	−0.50%
1962	2,009	−0.12%
1968	1,882	−1.08%
1975	1,724	−1.24%
1982	1,764	+0.33%
1990	1,740	−0.17%
1999	1,690	−0.32%
2007	1,934	+1.70%
2012	2,275	+3.30%
2017	2,482	+1.76%
2023	2,797	+2.01%

Source: EHESS and INSEE

As of 2017, there are 956 households in Joué-sur-Erdre. Of these, 25.5% consist of a single person, 26.3% of couples without children, 37.6% of couples with children and 9.0% of single parent households.

The median income was €19,930 in 2017, which is below the national average of €21,110.

== Education ==
There are two schools in Joué-sur-Erdre : the École primaire privée Saint Louis de Gonzague and the École Roger et Renée Jolivot.

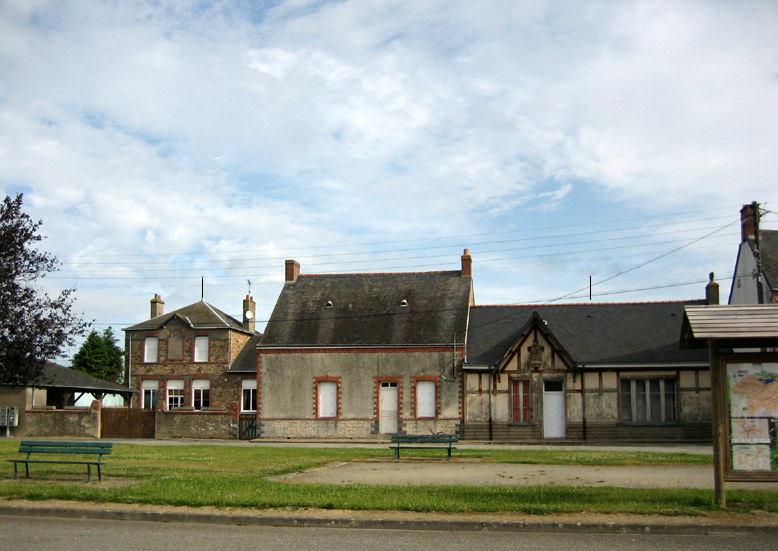
Schools of Joué-sur-Erdre.

=== Health ===
Joué-sur-Erdre is home to a Fire and Emergency Center.

=== Housing ===
As of 2017, there are 1,166 dwellings in Joué-sur-Erdre. Among these 80.7% are main residences, and only 2.7% are apartments. 81.0% of the main residences are owned by their occupant.

== Culture and heritage ==
=== Sights ===
==== Civil monuments ====
The castel of Vioreau; built in 1202. It remains only ruins.

The château de Lucinière built in the 14th and 19th centuries. Its chapel, its orangery, its dining room and its internal decoration are historic monuments since 9 December 1985.

The castel of la Chauvelière, 17th and 19th centuries, used to be own by the Brittany chancellor.

Vestiges of the fountain Saint-Léger from 17th-18th centuries

The houses of workers (1717) are in La Vallée.

The city hall is located in an old presbytery built by Father Tiger in 1784. It is the city hall since 1987.

The Hôtel des trois rois where Kings slept, including François Ier (May 1532), Henri II (on 12 July 1551), Charles IX and Catherine de Médicis (on 15 and 16 October 1565).

==== Churches ====
There are two churches in Joué-sur-Erdre :

- the église Saint-Léger of Joué built in 1883.
- the église de Notre-Dame-des-Langueurs, (also called Notre-Dame de la Pitié) built in the beginning of the 20th century. See The works of Jean Fréour. Sculptor of work in Notre-Dame-des-Langueurs church.
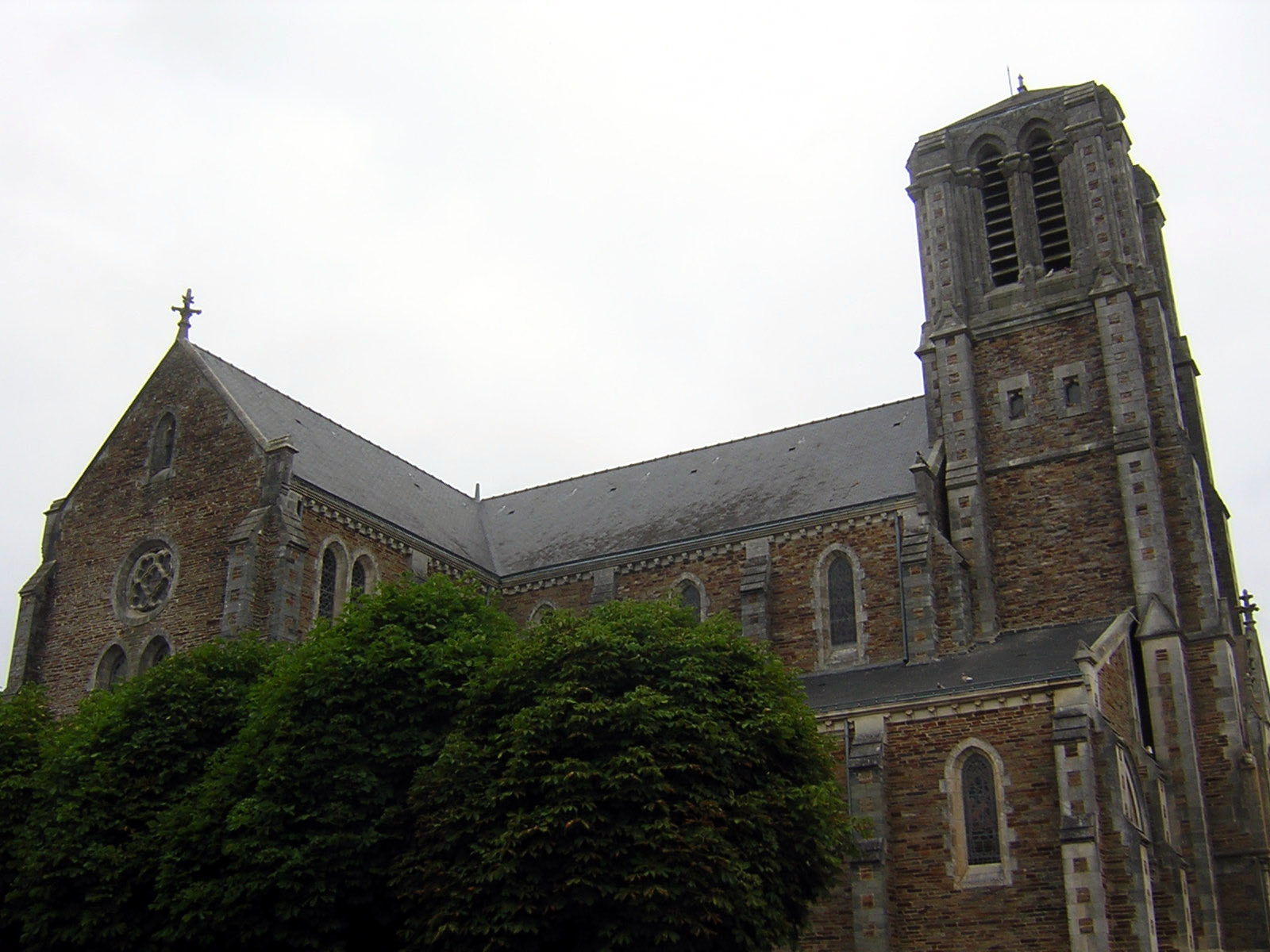
The église de Saint Léger

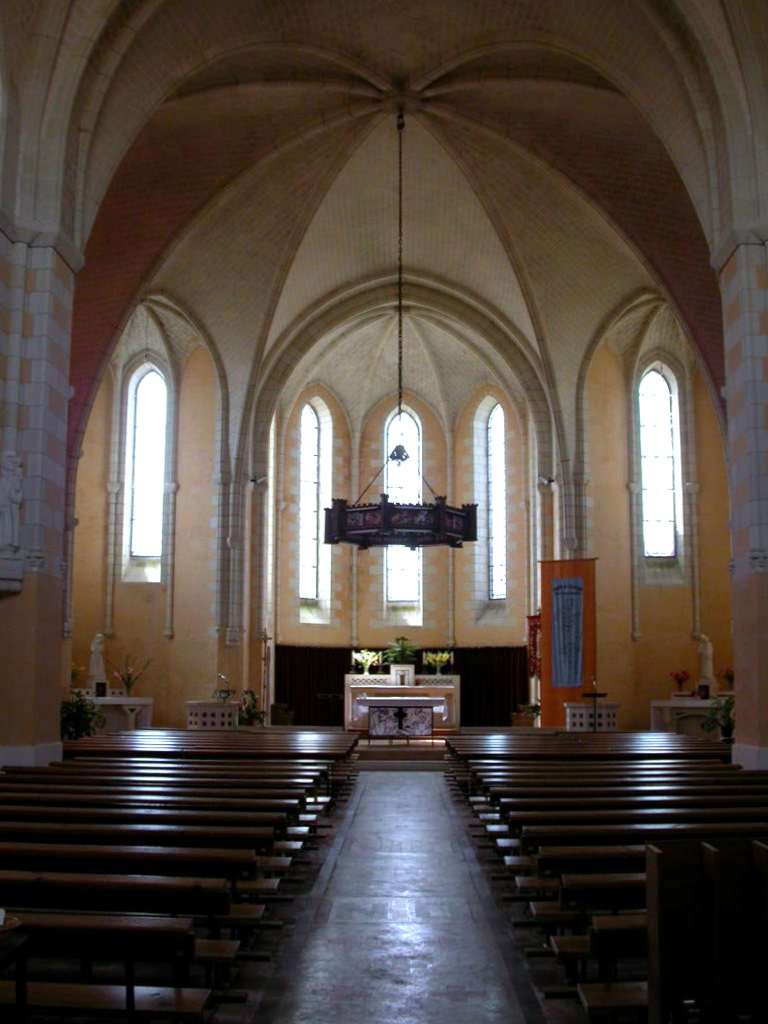
The église de Notre-Dame-des-Langueurs

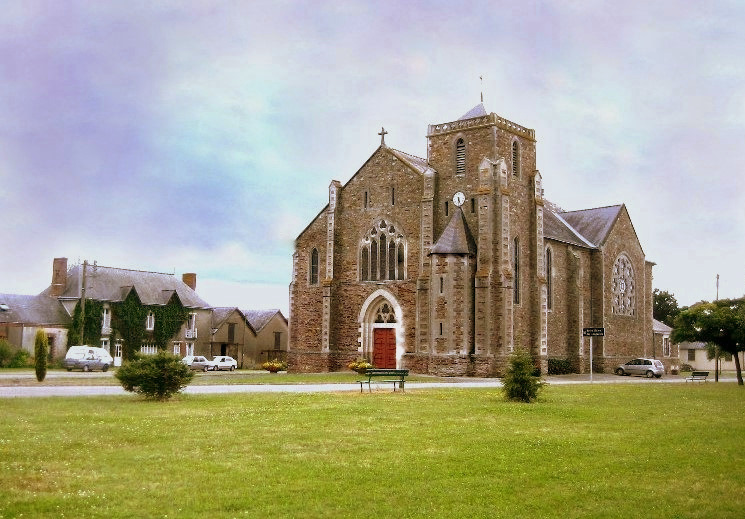
The église de Notre-Dame-des-Langueurs

=== Heraldry ===
blason	The coat of arms of Joué-sur-Erdre is blazonned : D'or à la bande ondée d'azur.

=== Parks ===
Joué-sur-Erdre hosts two lacs, the lake Vioreau, and the « Little Vioreau » which regularize the water level of the Canal de Nantes à Brest.

=== Cultural events ===
Each year the commune celebrate the "Pardon".

=== Sports and leisure activities ===
The lake Vioreau allows people to practice several sport activities such as water sports with the ASS Cercle de Voile de Vioreau.

== See also ==
- Communes of the Loire-Atlantique department
