= Mouzeil =

- Commune
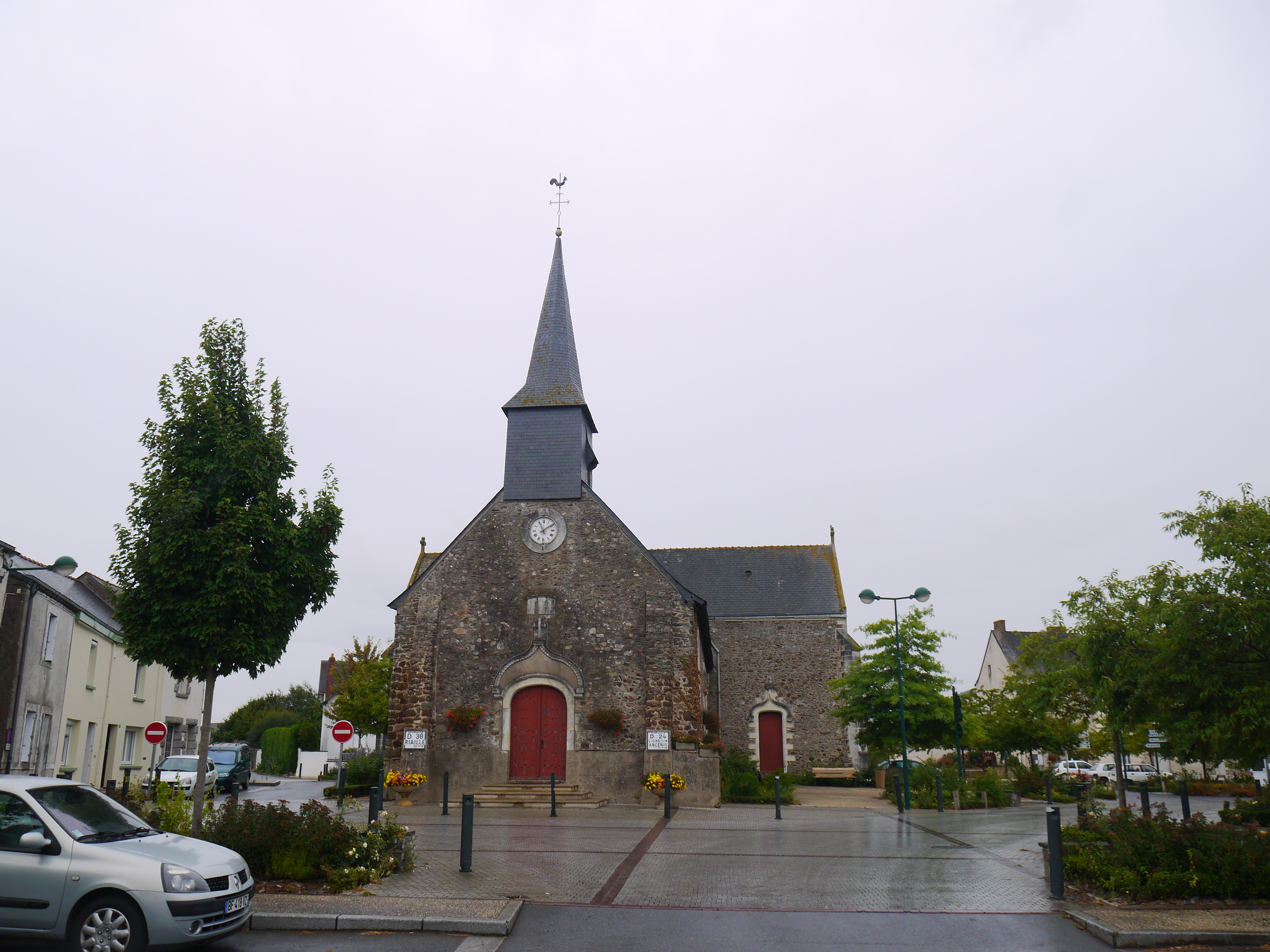
- Location of Mouzeil
- Location within France Location within Pays de la Loire
- Coordinates: 47°26′56″N 1°20′49″W
- Country: France
- Region: Pays de la Loire
- Department: Loire-Atlantique
- Arrondissement: Châteaubriant-Ancenis
- Canton: Nort-sur-Erdre
- Intercommunality: Pays d'Ancenis

Government
  - Mayor (2020–2026): Daniel Garnier
- Area^{1}: 18.87 km^{2} (7.29 sq mi)
- Highest elevation: 54 m (177 ft)
- Lowest elevation: 9 m (30 ft)
- Population (2023): 2,017
  - Density: 106.9/km^{2} (276.8/sq mi)
- Time zone: UTC+01:00 (CET)
  - Summer (DST): UTC+02:00 (CEST)
- INSEE/Postal code: 44107 /44850
- ^{1} French Land Register data, which excludes lakes, ponds, glaciers > 1 km^{2} (0.386 sq mi or 247 acres) and river estuaries.

Mouzeil (French pronunciation: [muzɛj]; Breton: Mouzel) is a commune in the Loire-Atlantique department in the Pays de la Loire in western France.

== Geography ==
Location of Mouzeil in the department of Loire-Atlantique.

=== Location ===
Mouzeil can be found in the countryside in the northern half of the department of Loire-Atlantique, about 30 kilometres (19 mi) northeast of Nantes, 10 kilometres (6.2 mi) east of Nort-sur-Erdre and 15 kilometres (9.3 mi) northwest of Ancenis. Its neighboring communities are (counter-clockwise) Ligné to the south-west, Couffé, Mésanger, Teillé, Trans-sur-Erdre and Les Touches.

=== Terrain and geology ===
The average elevation is 35 metres (0.022 mi) above sea level. The highest point is 53 metres (0.033 mi). The northern half of the commune is slightly more elevated than the south, with a depression found in the center.

Mouzeil is located on the eastern edge of the Armorican Massif. The north part of the commune sits on a formation of schist, sandstone, and volcanic rock (Upper Devonian-Ordovician). Further south, about 1 kilometre (0.62 mi) wide, there is another formation consisting of schist, psammite, greywacke, and conglomerates (Serpukhovian, early Bashkirian). In that area there are bituminous coal deposits. Even further south in the natural region of Mauges there is a sandstone horst. The southernmost zone consists of a Clum formation consisting of pelitic schist. About half of the northwest is covered in pliocene sand.

=== Hydrography ===
In the north, a creek serves as the boundary between Mouzeil and the neighboring community of Trans-sur-Erdre. In the east, the Donneau forms the border with Teillé. Three other creeks flow through the area.

=== Transportation ===
The town is crossed east to west by the D16 motorway and north to south by the D24.

Mouzeil was served by the Sergé to Nantes-Etat rail line from 1885 until 2011, when it was closed.

== History ==
=== Prehistory and antiquity ===
Due to polished stones discovered in Mouzeil, we know that people have been living there for around 6,000 years. Celtic and Gaelic tribes such as the Ligures, the Amoricans, and the Namnetes lived in the area before the arrival of the Romans. The commercial activities of the Romans necessitated the construction of roads. They colonized the area; exploiting its natural resources such as iron, limestone, and lime. Mouzeil has been part of a Parish since the fifth century.

=== Middle Ages ===
In the ninth century, the area suffered of constant raids by Vikings. They were driven away by Alan Wry-beard in 938. Mouzeil then passed into the control of Wry-beard's duchy, becoming part of the Marches of Brittany. Under the feudal system it was in the barony of Ancenis and the county of Nantes. The area around Mouzeil suffered damages due to attacks by Henry Plantagenet in 1175 and King John of England in 1214, and the war of Breton succession from 1341 to 1365. In 1488, Charles VIII of France and his armies besieged Ancenis and pillaged Mouzeil and the surrounding areas.

=== Early Modern Period ===
The region of Ancenis sits on a coal deposit which is shaped like a string and extends for hundreds of kilometers throughout the majority of the region. Mining had begun as early as the Roman period, but it expanded under the Ancien Régime. Mouzeil was home to several dozen miners until the 17th century.

=== Revolution ===
Mouzeil, unlike most communes in the region, supported Revolution. Although most of the municipalities in Ancenis did not send any volunteers to enlist in the Garde nationale Mouzeil sent five, the most out of any commune in the district. Mouzeil did not participate in the Chouan uprising, but the town was looted and there were killings.

=== 19th century ===
Coal mining became more important to the local economy due to new techniques such as mine shafts, and Underground mine ventilation. The allowed depth of mine shafts grew to 100 feet in 1791. Five mines were opened in Mouzeil between 1820 and 1826, the most notable among them being the mine installed in the southeast of the commune in 1825. A sixth mine was opened in 1838, near the village of Bourgonnière. Six Hundred people were employed in the sector in 1850.

In 1856 due to flooding Napoleon III made a detour through Mouzeil on his way to Nantes. The citizens of Mouzeil cheered when he passed by so the Emperor stopped and granted the requests of a widow, who petitioned him for the authorization to open an Inn. She called it l'Auberge de Cheval blanc (lit. Inn of the White Horse) because the Emperor had been riding a white horse that day.

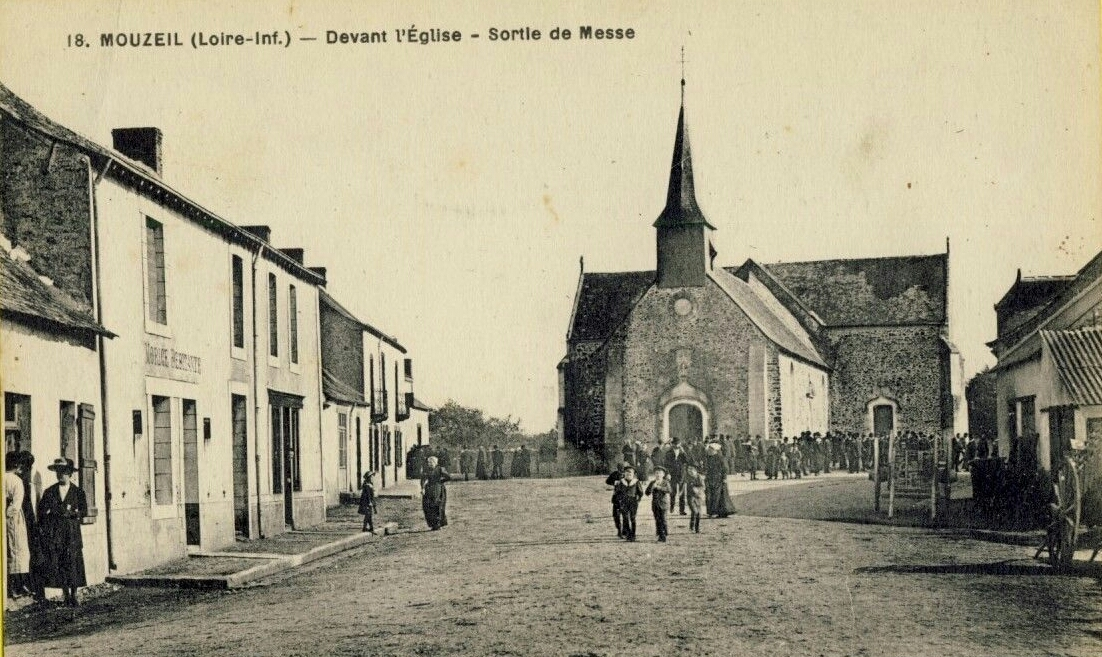
End of Mass in 1912

=== Since the 20th century ===
The mines closed in 1911, reopening from time to time during the world wars, before finally closing for good. 150 miners were laid off when they closed. Between 1819 and 1909 there were 79 accidental deaths in the mines in the area, the majority occurring in Mouzeil itself. Working conditions were poor and security precautions were lacking. Due to the closing of the mines, agriculture replaced mining as the commune's largest economic sector. A railway line from Segré to Nantes-État opened in 1885. There was a stop in Teillé, but it was actually closer to Mouzeil than Teillé. The rail line closed to passengers in 1939 and to freight in 1988. During the first world war 46 people, a quarter of those from Mouzeil who had enlisted, were killed.

== Politics and administration ==
Mouzeil is located in the canton of Nort-sur-Erdre, in the arrondissement of Châteaubriant-Ancenis in the Loire-Atlantique department, in the Pays de la Loire region. Like all French communes that have between 1,500 and 2,500 citizens, the municipal council has nineteen members (as of 2011).

=== Mayors of Mouzeil ===
List of mayors before 1944
| No. | Name | Term in office | |
| 1 | Louis Baudoin | 1790 | 1792 |
| 2 | René Jourdon | 1792 | 1793 |
| 3 | Jean Chapeau, Gabriel Baudoin, Adrien Gros (as a Commission) | 1793 | ? |
| 4 | Jean Chapeau, Jean Cruaud, Christophe Mercier (as a Commission) | ? | ? |
| 5 | Jean Cruaud | 1800 | 1807 |
| 6 | René Jourdon | 1807 | 1815 |
| 7 | Jean Amiot | 1815 | 1828 |
| 8 | Pierre Baudoin | 1828 | 1832 |
| 9 | Louis Corroyer | 1832 | 1843 |
| 10 | Pierre Godard | 1843 | 1846 |
| 11 | Jean Baudoin | 1846 | 1851 |
| 12 | Jean Leduc | 1851 | 1852 |
| 13 | Jean Baudoin | 1852 | 1855 |
| 14 | Jean Bossard | 1865 | 1870 |
| 15 | Félix Baudoin, Félix Rouxeau, Alexandre Cordeau, Eugène Bunel, Jean Chapeau (as a Commission) | 1870 | 1871 |
| 16 | Pierre Ouary | 1871 | 1878 |
| 17 | Félix Baudoin | 1878 | 1886 |
| 18 | Jean Chapeau-Bourgeois | 1886 | 1896 |
| 19 | Julien Cottineau | 1896 | 1919 |
| 20 | Alexandre Lermite | 1919 | 1943 |
| 21 | Jean Guérin | 1943 | 1944 |

List of mayors after 1944
| Term | Name |
|---|---|
| 1944–1951 | Alexandre Chauveau |
| 1951–1959 | Eugène Cruaud |
| 1959–1971 | Jean Jourdon |
| 1971–1983 | Louis Michaud |
| 1983–1995 | Jean Colas |
| 1995–2020 | Hervé Bréhier |
| 2020–incumbent | Daniel Garnier |

== Population ==
Historical population
| Year | Pop. | ±% p.a. |
|---|---|---|
| 1968 | 790 | — |
| 1975 | 720 | −1.32% |
| 1982 | 872 | +2.77% |
| 1990 | 1,190 | +3.96% |
| 1999 | 1,213 | +0.21% |
| 2007 | 1,658 | +3.98% |
| 2012 | 1,857 | +2.29% |
| 2017 | 1,889 | +0.34% |
| 2023 | 2,017 | +1.10% |
Source: INSEE

== Personalities ==
- Henri-Alphonse Deckherr (1842-1933), general during the Franco-Prussian War.

== See also ==
- Communes of the Loire-Atlantique department
