= Teillé =

Teillé may refer to the following places in France:

- Teillé, Loire-Atlantique, a commune in the Loire-Atlantique department
- Teillé, Sarthe, a commune in the Sarthe department
