= Nantes–Brest canal =

Canal in France

Nantes–Brest Canal
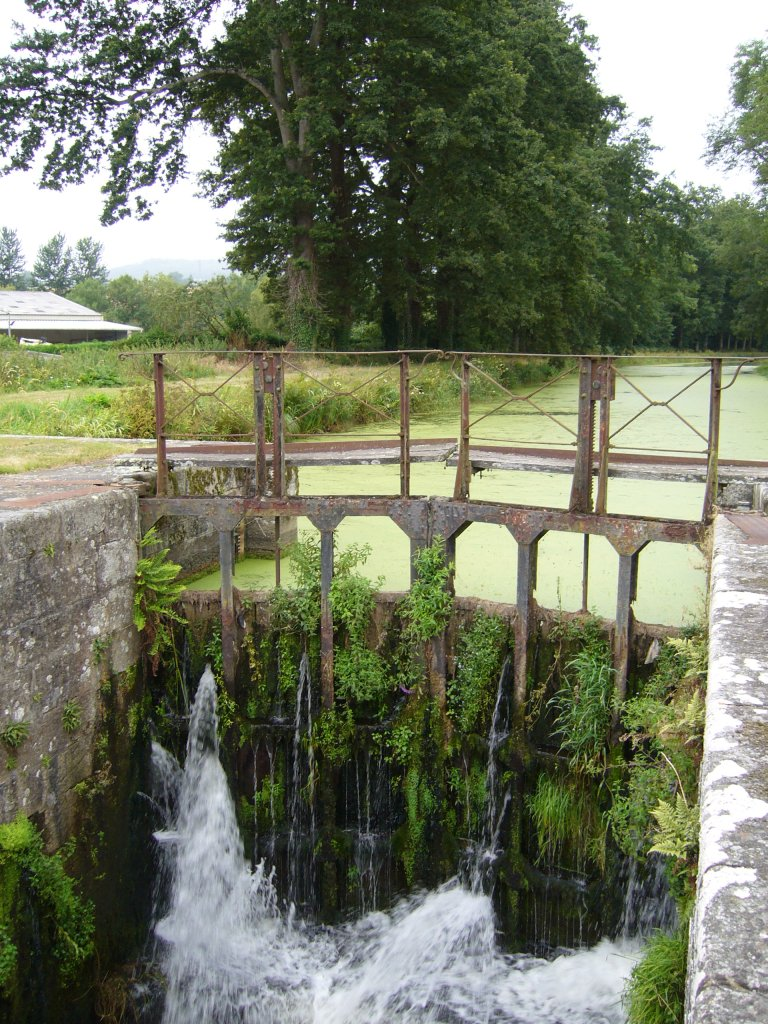
- Lock in the disused part of the Nantes–Brest Canal
- Interactive map of Nantes–Brest Canal

Specifications
- Length: 385 km (239 mi)
- Maximum boat length: 25.70 m
- Maximum boat beam: 4.65 m
- Locks: 107 (+ 45 in Finistère section) (originally 238)
- Total rise: 555 m (1,821 ft)
- Status: Open except for two breaks; Goariva to La Pitié, Guerlédan Dam to Pontivy

History
- Original owner: State in 1811. Canal Company of Brittany in 1822
- Date approved: 1802
- Construction began: 1811 start failed and began again in 1822
- Date completed: 1836

Geography
- Start point: Brest, France
- End point: Nantes
- Connects to: Loire Maritime Vilaine Blavet

The Nantes–Brest canal (French: Canal de Nantes à Brest, pronounced [kanal də nɑ̃t a bʁɛst]; Breton: Kanol Naoned-Brest) is a canal linking the two seaports of Nantes and Brest through inland Brittany. It was built in the early 19th century, with a total length of 385 km with 238 locks.

== History ==
Brittany started to develop its waterway network in 1538 when it decided to improve navigation on the River Vilaine. The project for a canal throughout the province was conceived by an 'inland navigation commission' convened in 1783. When Brest was blockaded by the English fleet, Napoleon decided to build the canal to provide a safe inland link between the two largest military ports of the French Atlantic. Building started in 1811, and Napoleon III presided over the canal's opening in 1858.

This was the most ambitious canal project ever completed in France, 360 km long with 238 locks. The canal was closed as a through route in 1920, when a section was submerged by the Guerlédan dam (PK 227), a short distance west of the junction with the canalised river Blavet at Pontivy. The dam was supposed to be equipped with a ladder of locks, receiving a significant subsidy from the state, but this was never done. The entire length of the canal west of Guerlédan was officially closed in 1957, and the 21 km length from Pontivy to Guerlédan also subsequently fell into disuse. The disappearance of all commercial traffic (in 26 m long barges carrying up to 140 tonnes) then resulted in the gradual silting up of the canal section between Rohan and Pontivy.

The canal has been revived, and ownership has been transferred from the State to Brittany Region, except for the short length in Pays de la Loire region.

== Navigation ==
Navigation is no longer possible between Pontivy and Goariva. Guerlédan reservoir flooded the canal over a length of 10 km including 17 locks. However, a length of 15 km with 10 locks has been restored upstream of Guerlédan reservoir to the heritage site of La Pitié Chapel, creating a section 25 km long. A public consultation was held in 2017 with a view to lifting the ban on thermal engines on this section.

Three separate navigable sections are thus presented in the route below.

== The Nantes-Brest cycle path ==
Though the break in the canal around Glomel has closed it for commercial navigation, the canal towpath has seen a dramatic increase in its use by cyclists. The path has now been surfaced to a good standard – some tarmac but mostly crushed stone – so that all but racing bikes can use it with ease. It is used not just for day rides, but also by an ever increasing number of people on cycling holidays on the whole Nantes-Brest section.

Fuelled by the creation of long-distance cycle routes throughout Europe, the canal forms the beginning of the EuroVelo (EV) EV1 Atlantic Coast route which runs to Spain and Portugal. The French section is known as La Vélodyssée, and it is now the most popular of all the French long-distance cycle paths. It also links with the EV6 Atlantic to Black Sea cycle route. This increase in tourism has been important for central Brittany, which has less tourism than the Brittany coast. The influx of cyclists has increased the income and the numbers of shops, restaurants, hotels and campsites in the area on or near the canal after many years of slow decline.

== Routes ==
=== Canal de Nantes à Brest (East) ===
Pontivy to Nantes 206 km via 107 locks (using successively the rivers Erdre, Isac, Vilaine and Oust)

- PK 2 Nantes
- PK 15 Sucé-sur-Erdre
- PK 21 Left turn onto the Erdre River at Nort-sur-Erdre
- PK 42.5 La Chevallerais
- PK 50 Blain
- PK 95 Redon
- PK 132 Malestroit
- PK 157.5 Josselin
- PK 182 Rohan
- PK 191.3 Saint-Gonnery begins the 5 km summit level
- PK 205.9 Pontivy, junction with the river Blavet.

Navigation interrupted from Pontivy to Guerlédan dam

=== Guerlédan–La Pitié section ===
- PK 226.8 Guerlédan dam
- PK 252.4 La Pitié

=== Finistère or western section ===
- PK 81 Goariva
- PK 73 Port-de-Carhaix, end of canal section, navigation enters canalized river Hyères
- PK 63 Maison du Canal at confluence of Hyères and Aulne rivers
- PK 43.5 Châteauneuf-du-Faou
- PK 0 Châteaulin

=== Tidal river Aulne and roadstead of port of Brest ===
- PK 0 Châteaulin
- PK 29 Landévennec.
- PK 32.5 Mouth of Aulne River
- PK 51 Roadstead of Brest Brest Harbor, Brest Bay

== See also ==
- List of canals in France
