= Le Cellier =

Le Cellier L'Çelier (Gallo) Keller (Breton)
- Commune
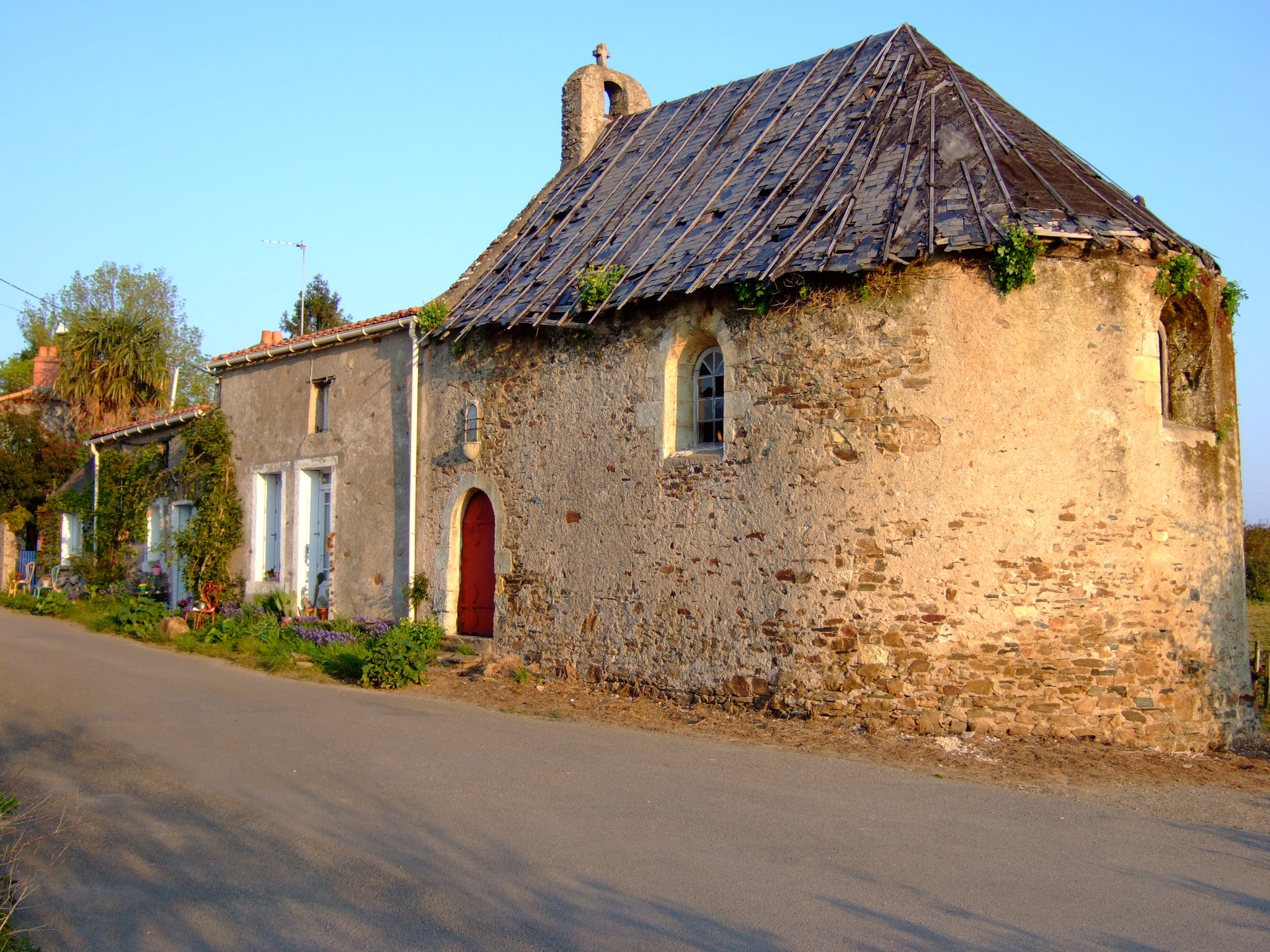

- Coat of arms
- Location of Le Cellier
- Location within France Location within Pays de la Loire
- Coordinates: 47°19′13″N 1°20′43″W
- Country: France
- Region: Pays de la Loire
- Department: Loire-Atlantique
- Arrondissement: Châteaubriant-Ancenis
- Canton: Nort-sur-Erdre

Government
  - Mayor (2020–2026): Philippe Morel
- Area^{1}: 35.99 km^{2} (13.90 sq mi)
- Population (2023): 4,051
  - Density: 112.6/km^{2} (291.5/sq mi)
- Time zone: UTC+01:00 (CET)
  - Summer (DST): UTC+02:00 (CEST)
- INSEE/Postal code: 44028 /44850
- Dialling codes: 0240
- ^{1} French Land Register data, which excludes lakes, ponds, glaciers > 1 km^{2} (0.386 sq mi or 247 acres) and river estuaries.

Le Cellier (French pronunciation: [lə sɛlje]; Gallo: L'Çelier, Breton: Keller) is a commune in the Loire-Atlantique department in western France.

== Population ==
Historical population

| Year | Pop. | ±% p.a. |
|---|---|---|
| 1793 | 1,496 | — |
| 1821 | 2,220 | +1.42% |
| 1846 | 2,311 | +0.16% |
| 1872 | 2,304 | −0.01% |
| 1901 | 2,532 | +0.33% |
| 1926 | 1,907 | −1.13% |
| 1946 | 1,898 | −0.02% |
| 1962 | 1,836 | −0.21% |
| 1968 | 1,844 | +0.07% |

| Year | Pop. | ±% p.a. |
|---|---|---|
| 1975 | 2,035 | +1.42% |
| 1982 | 2,681 | +4.02% |
| 1990 | 3,139 | +1.99% |
| 1999 | 3,448 | +1.05% |
| 2007 | 3,589 | +0.50% |
| 2012 | 3,726 | +0.75% |
| 2017 | 3,793 | +0.36% |
| 2023 | 4,051 | +1.10% |

Source: EHESS and INSEE (1968-2023)

== Sights ==
The commune lies on the north bank of the river Loire; this spot offers magnificent views.

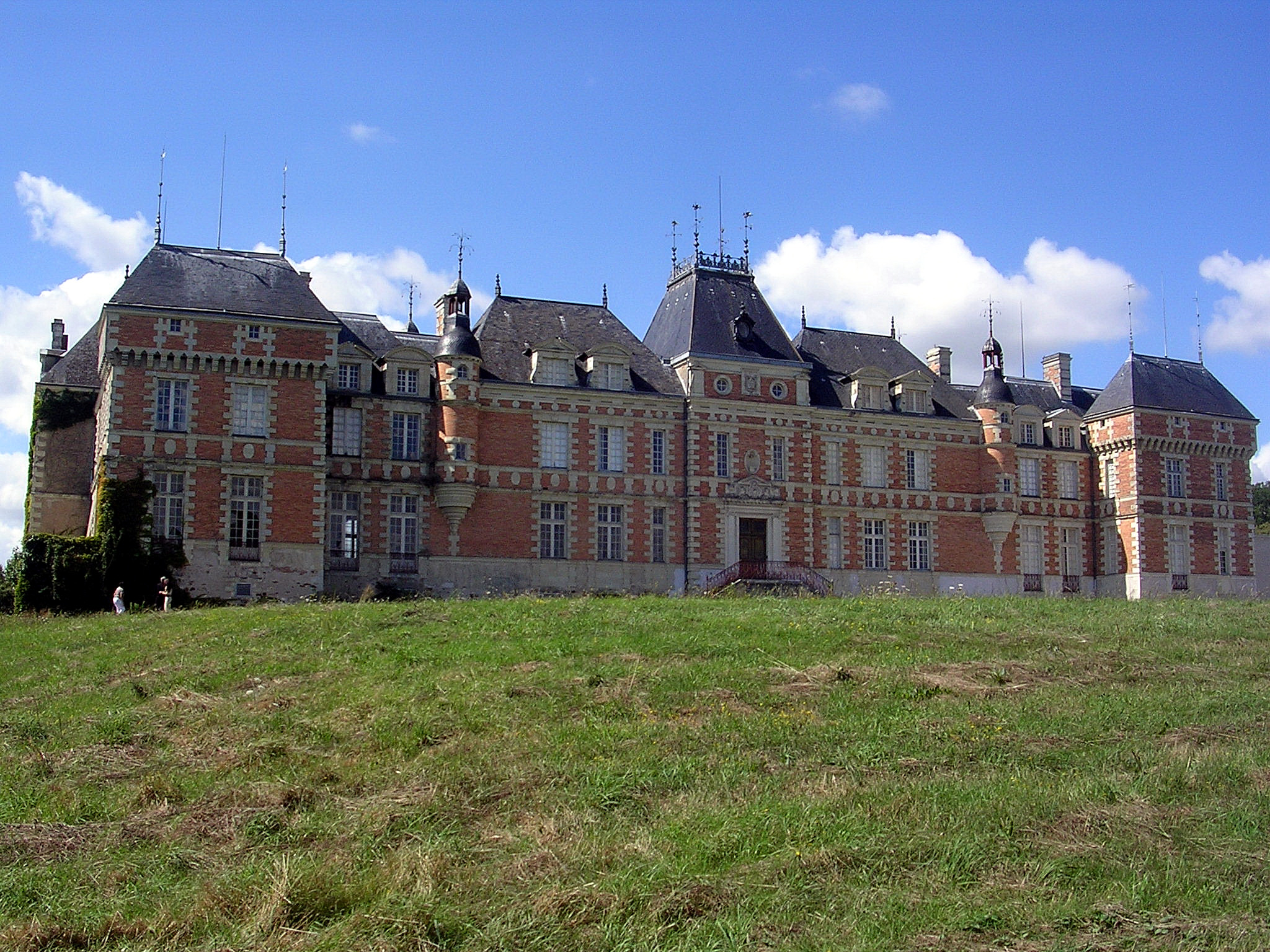
Château de Clermont

The Château de Clermont, built between 1643 and 1649 by the Chenu, an old French family, was acquired by the Maupassant family. At the end of his life, the actor Louis de Funès came to live in the castle, which had been inherited by his wife, a descendant of the Maupassants.

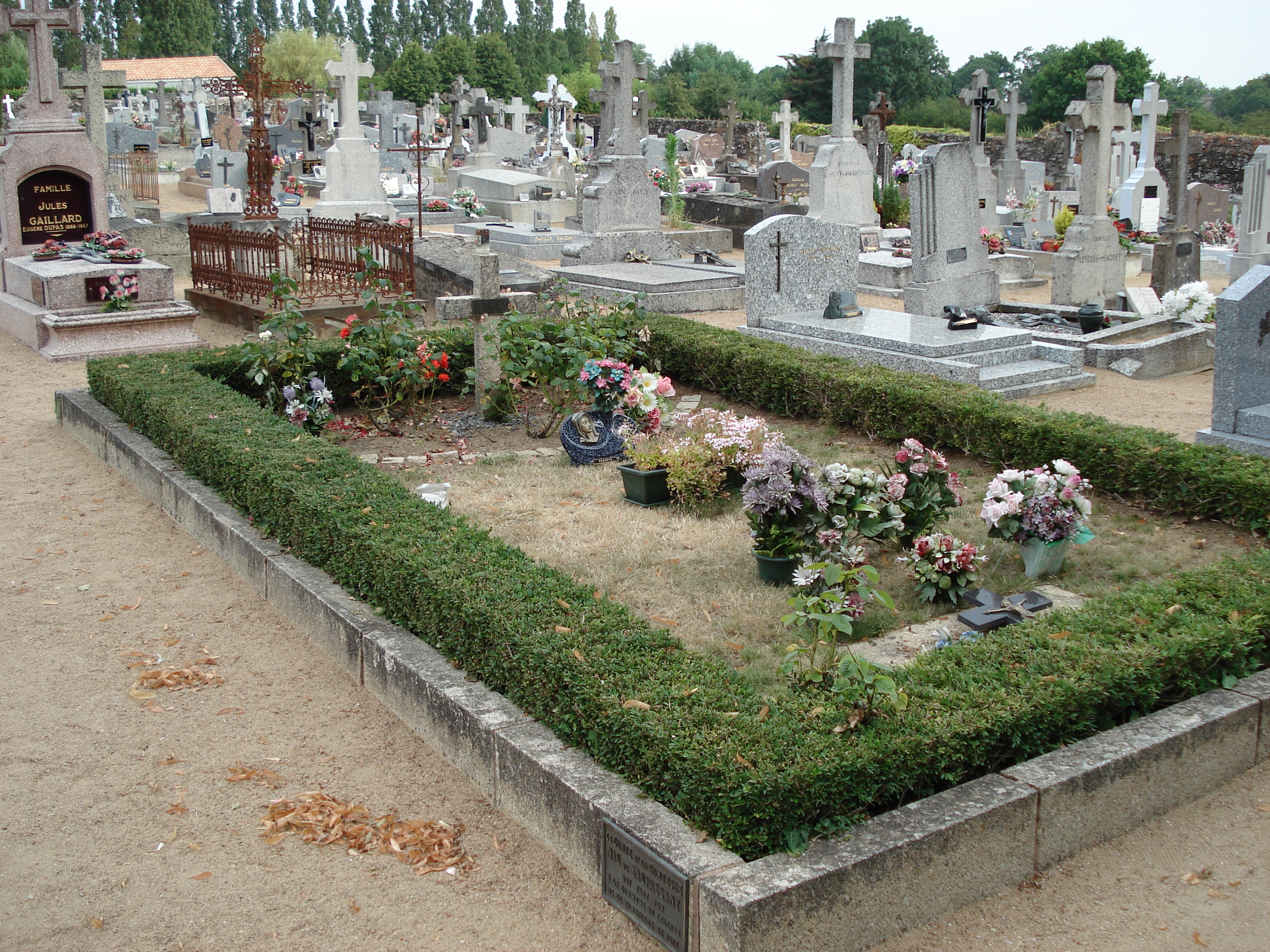
Tomb of Louis de Funès

In 2013 the mansion became a museum dedicated to Funes. The banks of the Loire were also visited by the poet René-Guy Cadou or the painter William Turner.

The Folies-Siffait are strange vestiges of architecture from the nineteenth century, hanging gardens overlooking the Loire River.

== See also ==
- Communes of the Loire-Atlantique department
