= Ligné, Loire-Atlantique =

Ligné Lignë (Gallo) Legneg (Breton)
- Commune
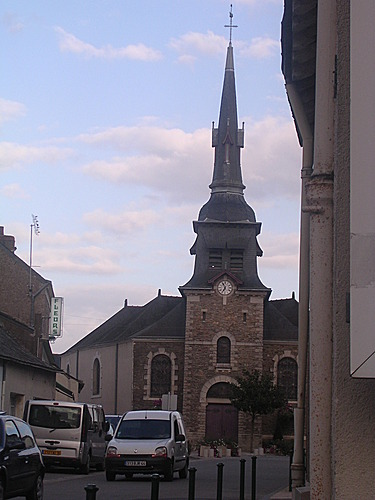

- Coat of arms
- Location of Ligné
- Location within France Location within Pays de la Loire
- Coordinates: 47°24′45″N 1°22′33″W
- Country: France
- Region: Pays de la Loire
- Department: Loire-Atlantique
- Arrondissement: Châteaubriant-Ancenis
- Canton: Nort-sur-Erdre
- Intercommunality: Pays d'Ancenis

Government
  - Mayor (2025–2026): Maurice Perrion
- Area^{1}: 45.41 km^{2} (17.53 sq mi)
- Highest elevation: 72 m (236 ft)
- Lowest elevation: 12 m (39 ft)
- Population (2023): 5,693
  - Density: 125.4/km^{2} (324.7/sq mi)
- Demonym(s): Lignéens, Lignéennes
- Time zone: UTC+01:00 (CET)
  - Summer (DST): UTC+02:00 (CEST)
- INSEE/Postal code: 44082 /44850
- ^{1} French Land Register data, which excludes lakes, ponds, glaciers > 1 km^{2} (0.386 sq mi or 247 acres) and river estuaries.

Ligné (French pronunciation: [liɲe]; Gallo: Lignë, Breton: Legneg) is a commune in the Loire-Atlantique department in western France.

== Location ==
Communes of Loire-Atlantique, with Ligné in red.

The commune of Ligné is located 25 km nord-east of Nantes, 17 km north-west of Ancenis and 10 km east of Nort-sur-Erdre. The bordering communes are Les Touches, Mouzeil, Couffé, Le Cellier, Saint-Mars-du-Désert and Petit-Mars.

Before 2015, Ligné was the capital of a canton that also included Couffé, Mouzeil and Le Cellier. The canton was split in 2015 and the commune joined the canton of Nort-sur-Erdre.

== Etymology ==
The name of the locality was attested in the Latin form Lingiacum in 11231, Ligiacum in 1128 and Ligneium in 1277. In Breton, she was called Polinieg by the Office of the Breton Language, name without historical value.

== History ==
Ligné extends over a height commonly referred to as "Ligné Plateau". This plateau forms the watershed between the Erdre and the Loire.

In the heart of the village, the chapel Saint-Mathurin (13th century) was the place of a great pilgrimage. After several damages throughout years, the chapel was renovated and transformed into a small exhibition center in 2012.

== Governance, culture, and education ==
=== List of successive mayors ===
Period	Name	Political party	Occupation
1834-1843	Jean Ouairy		
1843-1848	Julien David		
16 April 1848 – 5 November 1848	Louis Ouairy "father"		
5 November 1848 – 14 June 1855	Emmanuel Botte		
14 June 1855 – 12 October 1861	Louis Ouairy "son"		
12 October 1861 – 1870	Nicolas Kerbarh		
1870-1884	Jean Rabu		
1884-1908	Auguste du Ponceau		
1908-1922	Gilbert de Ponsay		
1922-1925	Gabriel de la Rochefordière		
1925-1954	François du Rusquec		
1954-1965	Gilbert Moinard		
1965-1969	Louis Jourdon		
1969-1995	Jean Robin	Miscellaneous right (DVD)	carpenter
1995-current	Maurice Perrion	UDF, then MoDem, then AC, then UDI	Business Manager, Regional Councilor (7th Vice-President) President of the Association of Mayors of Loire-Atlantique

== Population ==
Historical population
Year	Pop.	±% p.a.
1968	1,664	—
1975	1,662	−0.02%
1982	2,211	+4.16%
1990	2,730	+2.67%
1999	2,948	+0.86%
2007	3,943	+3.70%
2012	4,713	+3.63%
2017	5,174	+1.88%
2023	5,693	+1.61%
Source: INSEE

=== Twinning ===
Lignée is twinned with Presteigne, Wales since 2004. Cultural exchanges and trips are regularly organized between the two cities.

=== Culture ===
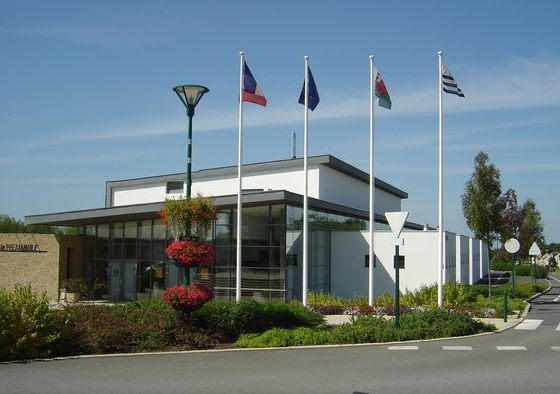
Centre Le Préambule

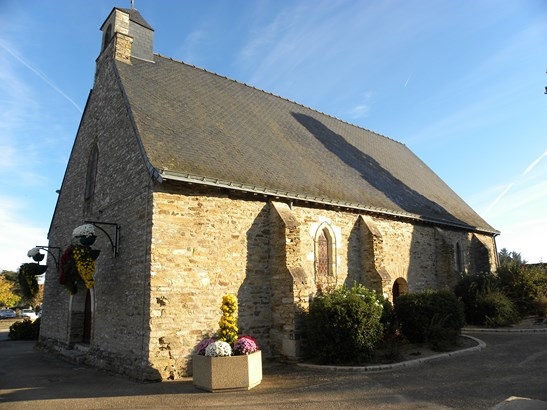
The chapel

Ligné has a few cultural centers. "Le Préambule" is a multipurpose room opened since 2003 that is reconfigurable to host different types of events. Cultural programming is offered every year from September to May. Both rooms are also used to teach artistic practices. The Saint-Mathurin chaptel is since 2012 a small exhibition center dedicated to visual arts. The city also has a municipal library, as well as two sports complexes.

=== Education ===
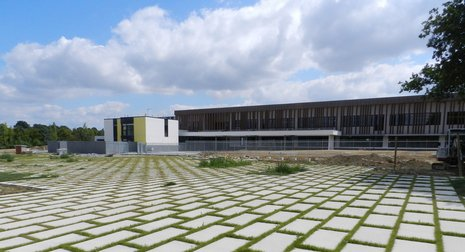
Agnès Varda High School

With a young and growing population, Ligné offers a broad educational offer to its inhabitants. The city has two schools, one public and the other private and two high schools that follow the same principle. Private schools are Notre-Dame primary school and Saint-Joseph High School, while public schools are Jules Verne primary school and Agnès Varda High School. Agnès Varda College was inaugurated in 2011 and named in honor of the director of the same name. It welcomes more than 750 students.

== See also ==
- Communes of the Loire-Atlantique department
