= Rohan, Morbihan =

Rohan Roc'han
- Commune
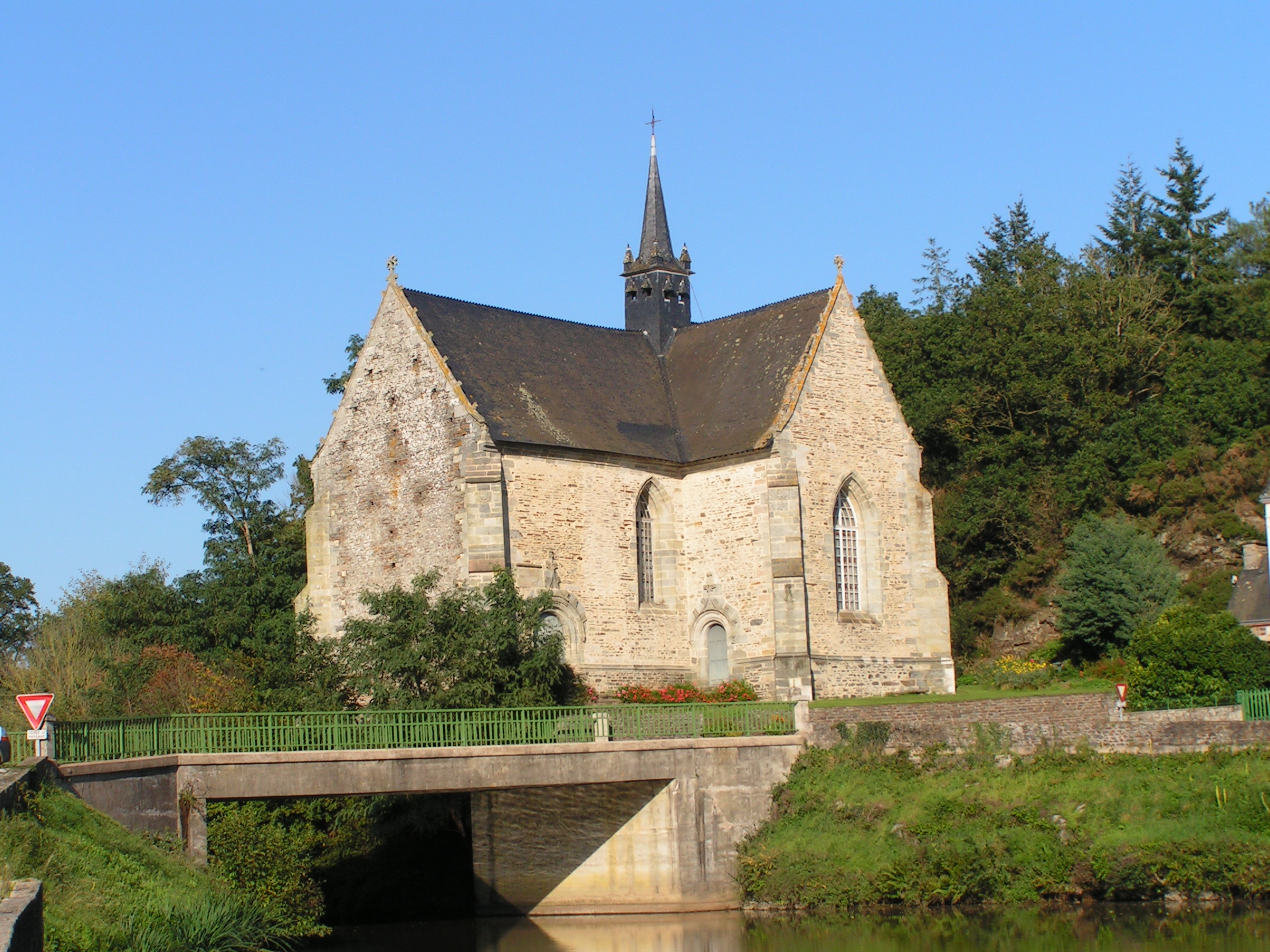
- The Chapel of Our Lady of Good Encounter, with the Nantes-Brest canal in the foreground

- Coat of arms
- Location of Rohan
- Location within France Location within Brittany
- Coordinates: 48°04′09″N 2°45′06″W
- Country: France
- Region: Brittany
- Department: Morbihan
- Arrondissement: Pontivy
- Canton: Grand-Champ
- Intercommunality: Pontivy

Government
  - Mayor (2026–32): Christophe Jouanno
- Area^{1}: 23.43 km^{2} (9.05 sq mi)
- Elevation: 110 m (360 ft)
- Highest elevation: 150 m (490 ft)
- Lowest elevation: 60 m (200 ft)
- Population (2023): 1,526
  - Density: 65.13/km^{2} (168.7/sq mi)
- Time zone: UTC+01:00 (CET)
  - Summer (DST): UTC+02:00 (CEST)
- INSEE/Postal code: 56198 /56580
- ^{1} French Land Register data, which excludes lakes, ponds, glaciers > 1 km^{2} (0.386 sq mi or 247 acres) and river estuaries.

Rohan (French pronunciation: [ʁɔɑ̃]; Breton: Roc'han) is a commune in the Morbihan department in Brittany in north-western France. Inhabitants of Rohan are called Rohannais.

It is the home to the House of Rohan, members of which included viscounts, dukes and princes and has had a prominent role in French history. The commune's coat of arms is identical to that of the family.

== Geography ==
Rohan is situated on the banks of the river Oust and the Canal from Nantes to Brest (which merge for a part of their journey), upstream of Josselin and at the edge of a plateau.

== See also ==
- Communes of the Morbihan department
