= Erdre =

River in France

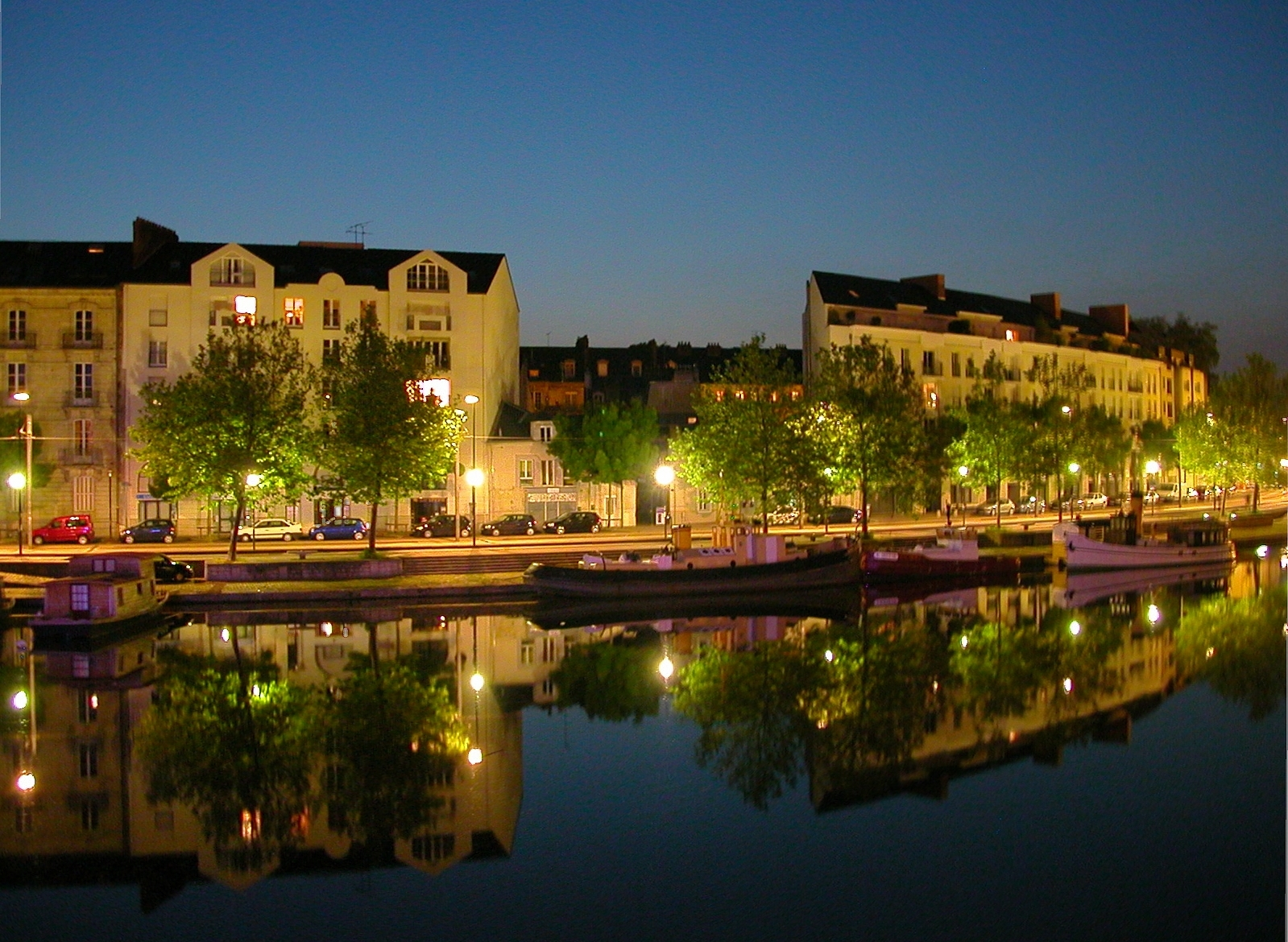
- The quai de Versailles in Nantes

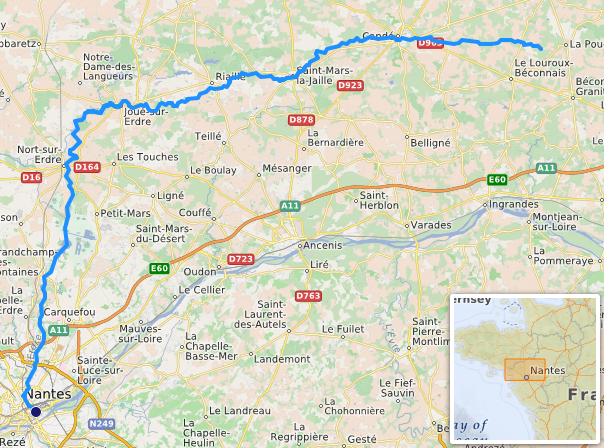
- Native name: Erdre (French); L'Edre (French)

Location
- Country: France

Physical characteristics
- Source
  - location: Maine-et-Loire
- Mouth
  - location: Loire
  - coordinates: 47°12′42″N 1°32′22″W
- Length: 97.4 km (60.5 mi)
- Basin size: 936 km^{2} (361 sq mi)
- Discharge
  - average: 2.5 m^{3}/s (88 cu ft/s)

Basin features
- Progression: Loire→ Atlantic Ocean

The Erdre (French pronunciation: [ɛʁdʁ]; Breton: Erzh) is a 97.4 km (60.5 mi) long river in western France, right tributary to the Loire. Its source is in the Maine-et-Loire department, near La Pouëze. It flows through the departments Maine-et-Loire and Loire-Atlantique. The Erdre meets the Loire in the city of Nantes. Other towns on the Erdre, going downstream, are Candé, Riaillé, Nort-sur-Erdre and Sucé-sur-Erdre.

South of Nort-sur-Erdre, the river flows through reclaimed marshland, and is up to a kilometer wide at the Plaine de Mazerolles near Sucé-sur-Erdre. At the Plaine de la Poupiniere, the Nantes-Brest canal joins the Erdre.

The Erdre flows into the Loire via the St Felix canal tunnel under Rue Henri IV, emerging near the main railway station. Its former course is a main road and shopping area, the Cours des Cinquante Otages.
