= Mellionnec =

Mellionnec Melioneg
- Commune
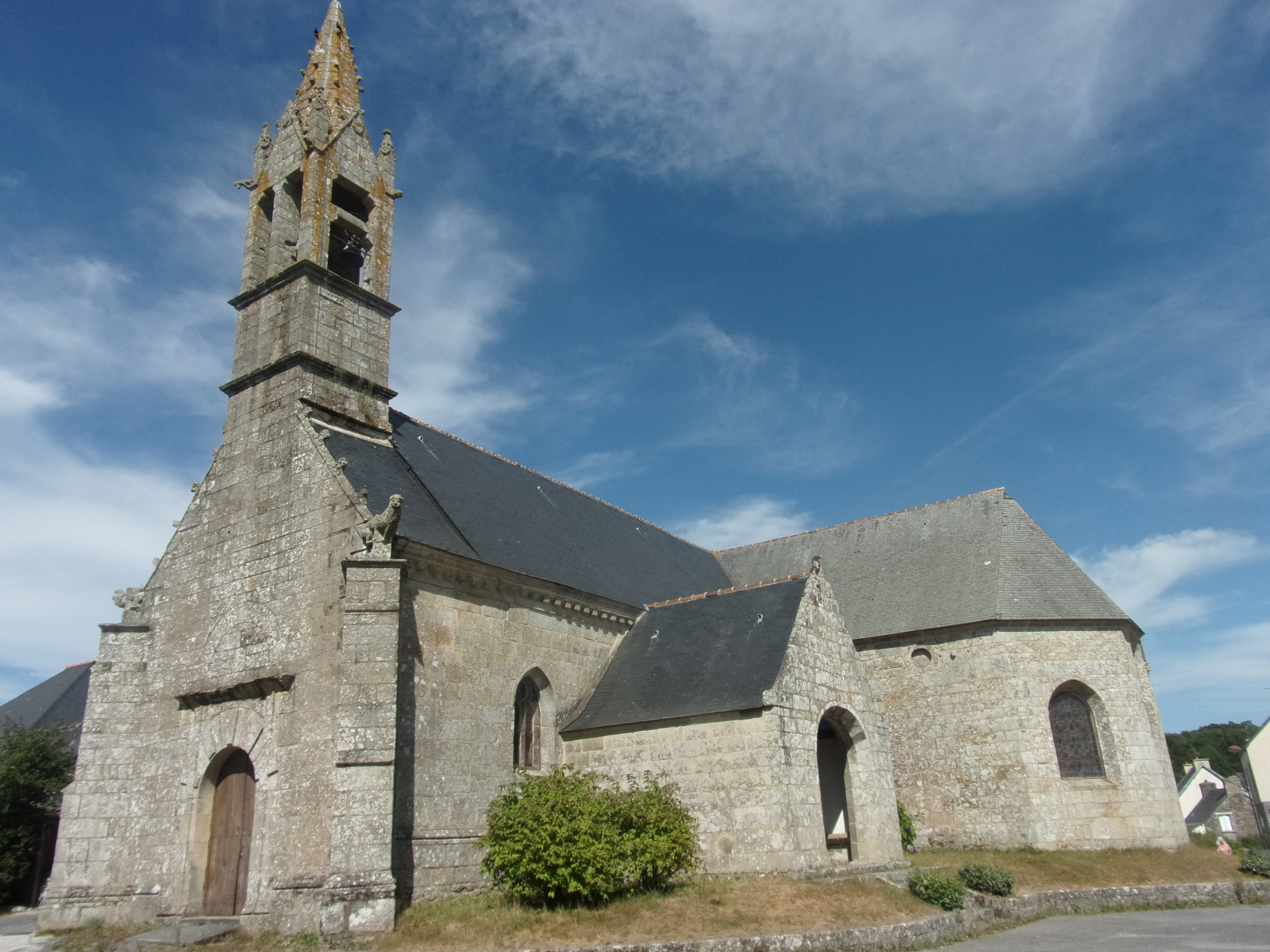
- The parish church
- Location of Mellionnec
- Location within France Location within Brittany
- Coordinates: 48°10′32″N 3°17′43″W
- Country: France
- Region: Brittany
- Department: Côtes-d'Armor
- Arrondissement: Guingamp
- Canton: Rostrenen
- Intercommunality: Kreiz-Breizh

Government
  - Mayor (2024–2026): Pierre-Yves Daniel
- Area^{1}: 24.22 km^{2} (9.35 sq mi)
- Highest elevation: 281 m (922 ft)
- Lowest elevation: 143 m (469 ft)
- Population (2023): 443
  - Density: 18.3/km^{2} (47.4/sq mi)
- Time zone: UTC+01:00 (CET)
  - Summer (DST): UTC+02:00 (CEST)
- INSEE/Postal code: 22146 /22110
- ^{1} French Land Register data, which excludes lakes, ponds, glaciers > 1 km^{2} (0.386 sq mi or 247 acres) and river estuaries.

Mellionnec (French pronunciation: [mɛljɔnɛk]; Breton: Melioneg) is a commune in the Côtes-d'Armor department in Brittany in northwestern France. The chapel of La Pitié is situated in the commune.

== Population ==
Historical population
Year	Pop.	±% p.a.
1968	749	—
1975	628	−2.49%
1982	567	−1.45%
1990	420	−3.68%
1999	440	+0.52%
2007	409	−0.91%
2012	413	+0.19%
2017	399	−0.69%
2023	443	+1.76%
Source: INSEE

Inhabitants of Mellionnec are called mellionnecais in French.

== Map ==
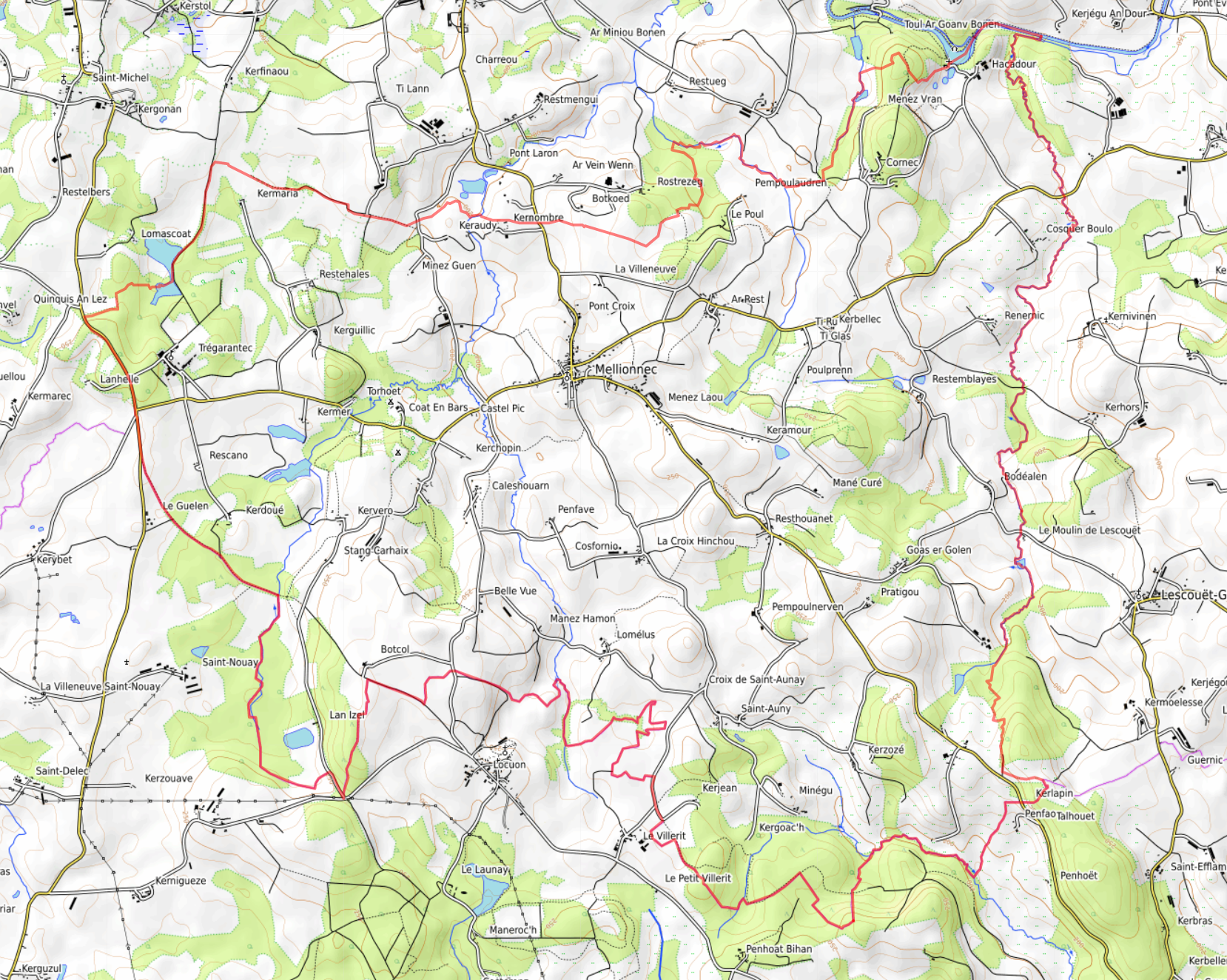
Topographic map

== Civil heritage ==
- Trégarantec castle

== See also ==
- Communes of the Côtes-d'Armor department
