= Goariva =

Coordinates: 48.26074°N 3.52695°W

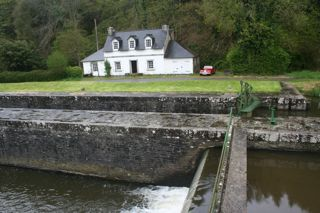
Goariva, May 2013, Lock 192 Nantes-Brest Canal

Goariva is a village in the Carhaix-Plouguer commune in the Finistère department in north-western France.

== Overview ==
Goariva is also the name assigned to Lock 192 on the Nantes-Brest canal. This is the last lock on the currently navigable western section of the canal and it is located close to the old town of Carhaix-Plouguer. As well as being on the Nantes-Brest Blueway, the lock is on the V6 Greenway (close to the intersections with the V1 and V7).

== See also ==
- Communes of the Finistère department
