= Henri-Alphonse Deckherr =

French soldier (1842–1933)

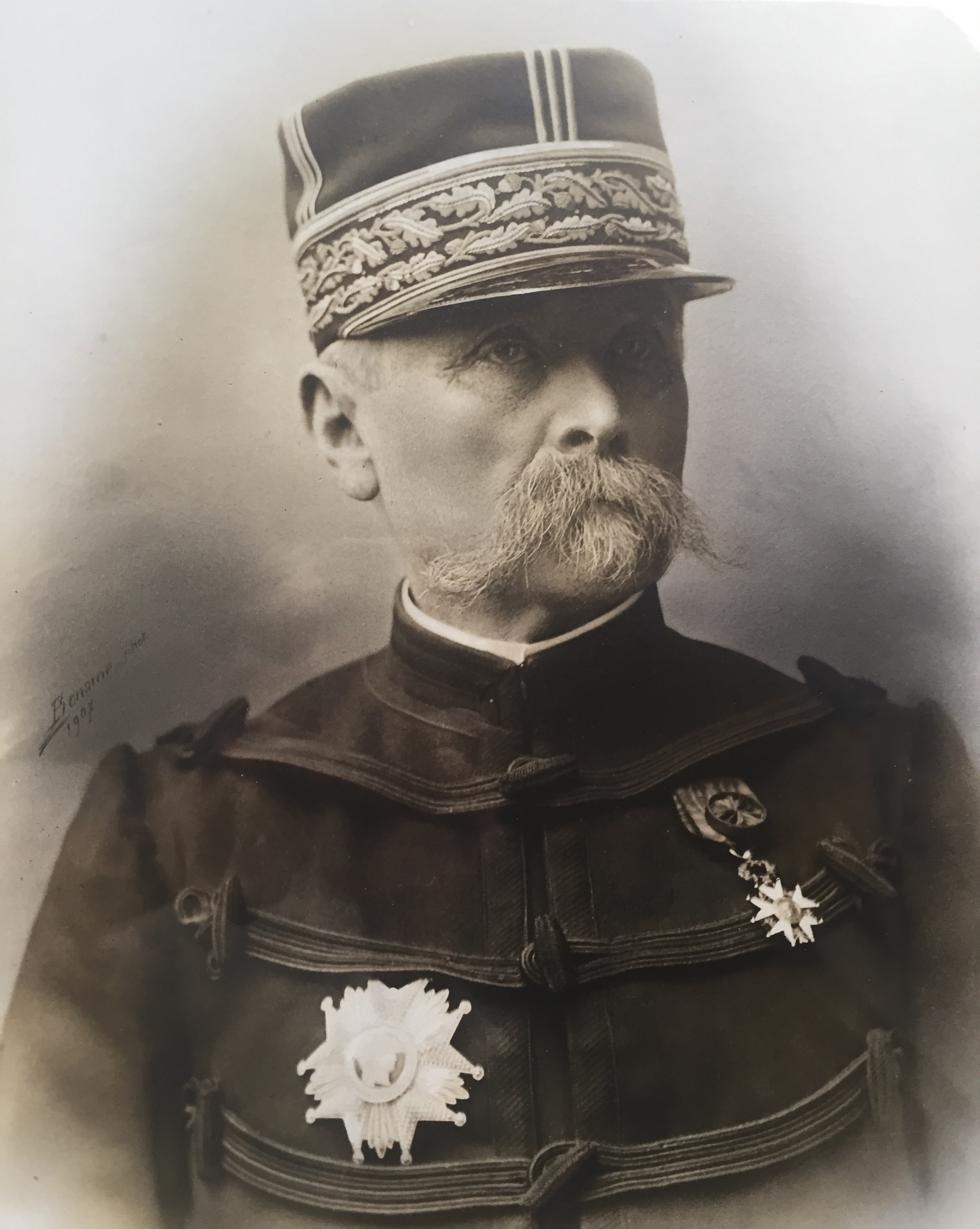
- General Deckherr
- Born: March 27, 1842; Mouzeil, France
- Died: February 2, 1933 (aged 90)
- Military career
- Allegiance: Second French Empire; French Third Republic
- Branch: French Army
- Service years: 1862–1907
- Rank: Division General
- Commands: 41st Infantry Division
- Awards: Legion of Honour

Henri-Alphonse Deckherr (1842–1933) was a French Division General. Early in his career, he fought in the Franco-Prussian War.

== Career ==
Having studied at the École spéciale militaire de Saint-Cyr in 1860, he reached the rank of second lieutenant on October 1, 1862. He became the lieutenant of the 36th infantry regiment in Algeria in August, 1868. During the Franco-Prussian war (1870-1871) he took part in the Battle of Wörth. He was made Captain at the Battle of Sedan, and then taken prisoner along with the rest of the army. He became the Major of the 110th infantry regiment in June 1879 then Battalion Commander in April 1880. In March 1889 he was named lieutenant-colonel of the 58th infantry division, and then in September 1892, the Colonel of the 153rd. He was promoted to Division General in 1901. He continued to serve until his retirement in 1907. He was presented with the Legion of Honour that same year in recognition of his service.

== Ranks ==
- 19/07/1892: Colonel
- 01/09/1897: Brigade Commander
- 30/12/1901: Division General
