= La Pitié =

Coordinates: 48°11′36.73″N 3°15′38.40″W

La Pitié is a chapel in the commune of Mellionnec in the Côtes-d'Armor department in Brittany in north-western France. It is on the shore of Canal de Nantes à Brest between locks 146 and 147.

== Photos ==
- Chapelle N-D de Pitié (Mellionnec)
- Mellionnec - La Pitié
- Le canal de Nantes à Brest à Mellionnec
- Ecluse 147 Restouel été 2006
- Ecluse 146 Coatnatous été 2006

== See also ==
- Pitié-Salpêtrière Hospital
- La Pitié suprême
