= Gaujac =

Gaujac is the name of several communes in the south of France:

- Gaujac, Gard
- Gaujac, Gers
- Gaujac, Lot-et-Garonne

== See also ==
- Gaugeac, in the Dordogne department
- Gaujacq, in the Landes department
