= Canton of Nort-sur-Erdre =

Coordinates: 47.44°N 1.50°W

The canton of Nort-sur-Erdre is an administrative division of the Loire-Atlantique department, western France. Its borders were modified at the French canton reorganisation which came into effect in March 2015. Its seat is in Nort-sur-Erdre.

It consists of the following communes:

1. Casson
2. Le Cellier
3. Héric
4. Joué-sur-Erdre
5. Ligné
6. Mouzeil
7. Nort-sur-Erdre
8. Notre-Dame-des-Landes
9. Petit-Mars
10. Riaillé
11. Saint-Mars-du-Désert
12. Teillé
13. Les Touches
14. Trans-sur-Erdre
