= Gaugeac =

- Commune
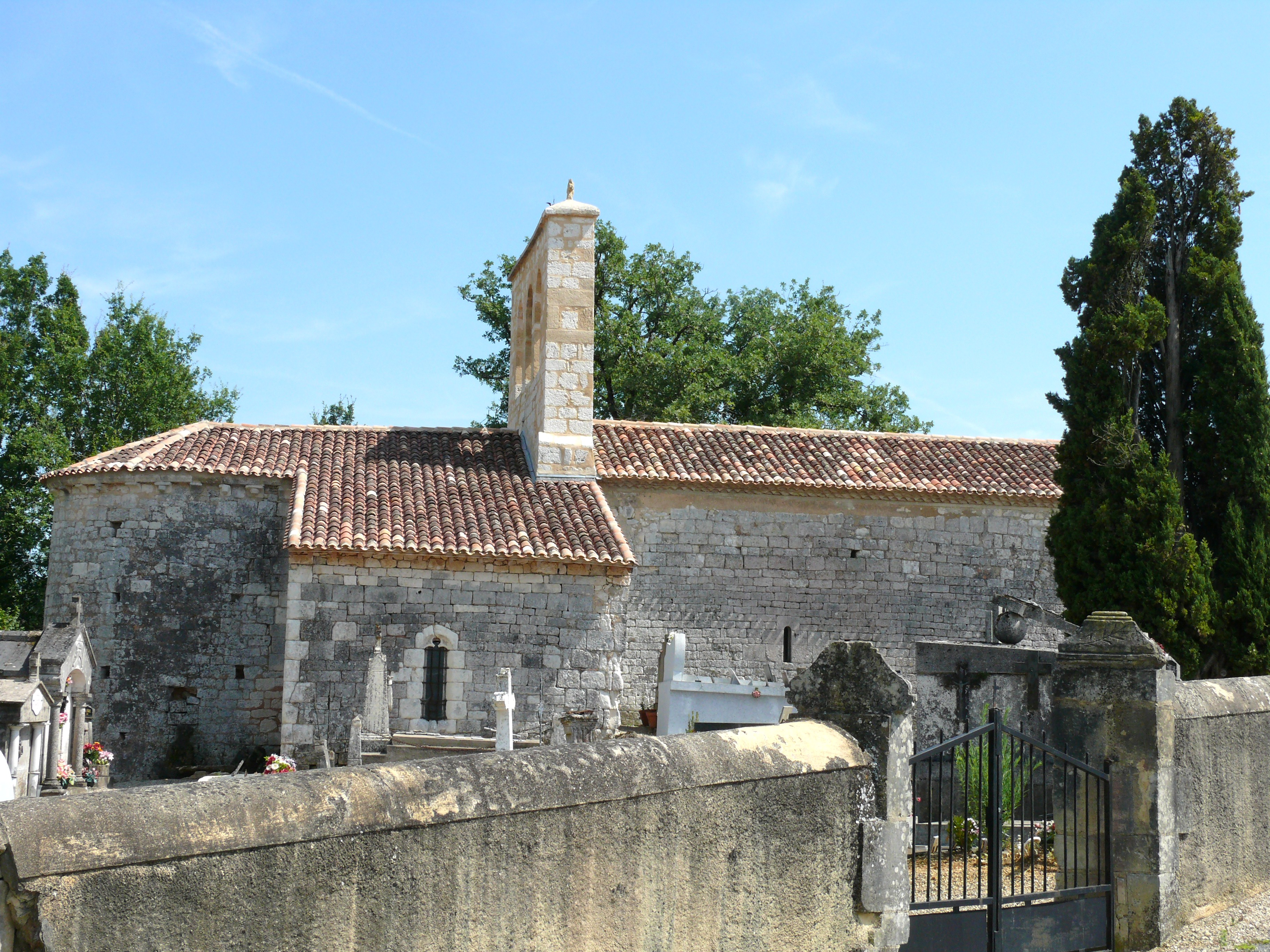
- The church in Gaugeac
- Location of Gaugeac
- Location within France Location within Nouvelle-Aquitaine
- Coordinates: 44°39′36″N 0°52′54″E
- Country: France
- Region: Nouvelle-Aquitaine
- Department: Dordogne
- Arrondissement: Bergerac
- Canton: Lalinde

Government
  - Mayor (2020–2026): Robert Rougier
- Area^{1}: 10.17 km^{2} (3.93 sq mi)
- Elevation: 200 m (660 ft)
- Highest elevation: 231 m (758 ft)
- Lowest elevation: 120 m (390 ft)
- Population (2023): 106
  - Density: 10.4/km^{2} (27.0/sq mi)
- Time zone: UTC+01:00 (CET)
  - Summer (DST): UTC+02:00 (CEST)
- INSEE/Postal code: 24195 /24540
- ^{1} French Land Register data, which excludes lakes, ponds, glaciers > 1 km^{2} (0.386 sq mi or 247 acres) and river estuaries.

Gaugeac (French pronunciation: [ɡoʒak]; Occitan: Gaujac) is a commune in the Dordogne department in Nouvelle-Aquitaine in southwestern France.

== Population ==
Historical population
Year	Pop.	±% p.a.
1968	125	—
1975	122	−0.35%
1982	121	−0.12%
1990	123	+0.21%
1999	118	−0.46%
2007	115	−0.32%
2012	116	+0.17%
2017	112	−0.70%
2023	106	−0.91%
Source: INSEE

== Geography ==
Gaugeac borders eight other communes including one, Parranquet, in the department of Lot-et-Garonne. To the north, the communal territory is about fifty meters from that of Lavalade.

== See also ==
- Communes of the Dordogne department
