= Sucé-sur-Erdre =

- Commune
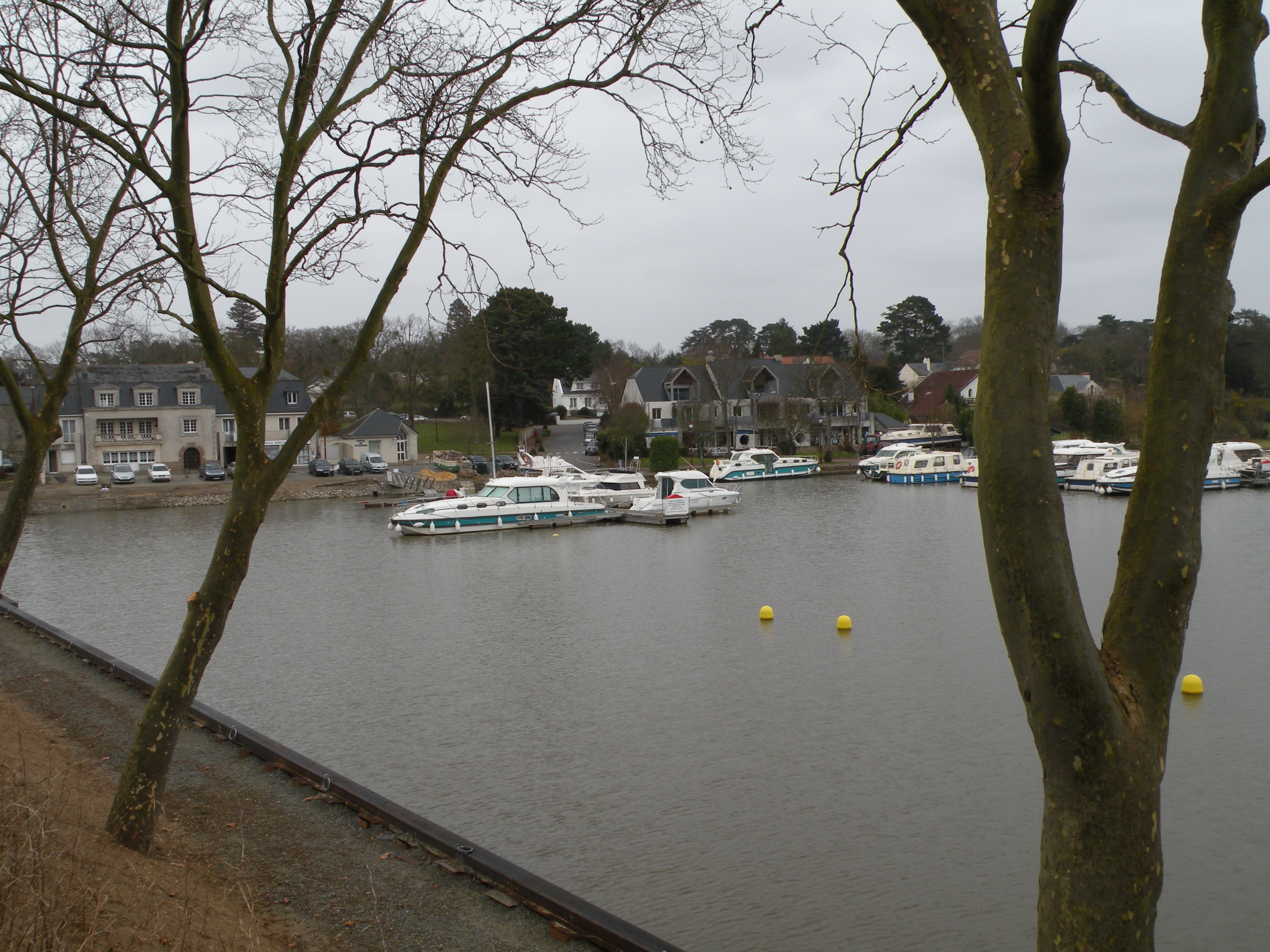
- The marina on the Erdre

- Coat of arms
- Location of Sucé-sur-Erdre
- Location within France Location within Pays de la Loire
- Coordinates: 47°20′44″N 1°31′42″W
- Country: France
- Region: Pays de la Loire
- Department: Loire-Atlantique
- Arrondissement: Châteaubriant-Ancenis
- Canton: La Chapelle-sur-Erdre
- Intercommunality: Erdre et Gesvres

Government
  - Mayor (2023–2026): Julien Le Métayer
- Area^{1}: 41.33 km^{2} (15.96 sq mi)
- Elevation: 14 m (46 ft)
- Highest elevation: 47 m (154 ft)
- Lowest elevation: 2 m (6.6 ft)
- Population (2023): 7,539
  - Density: 182.4/km^{2} (472.4/sq mi)
- Time zone: UTC+01:00 (CET)
  - Summer (DST): UTC+02:00 (CEST)
- INSEE/Postal code: 44201 /44240
- ^{1} French Land Register data, which excludes lakes, ponds, glaciers > 1 km^{2} (0.386 sq mi or 247 acres) and river estuaries.

Sucé-sur-Erdre (French pronunciation: [syse syʁ ɛʁdʁ], literally Sucé on Erdre; Breton: Sulieg) is a commune in the Loire-Atlantique department in western France.

Its name comes from the Latin sulcus, meaning "furrow", and the Celtic erdam, meaning "small river".

Sucé-sur-Erdre, as its name indicates, is located on the river Erdre, which at this point is near its confluence with the Loire. The town was fairly small (2,000 or so) for quite some time until it began to be absorbed into the greater suburbia of Nantes. As of 2023, it has about 7,500 inhabitants, a significant portion of which commute to Nantes. In general, the area is middle-class with a good portion of upper-middle class and upper-class homes, especially on the river banks.

Sucé-sur-Erdre is relatively well known in the area for its scenic river landscapes, and its many water sports opportunities, including fishing, sailing, windsurfing in Mazerolles (Funboard44), kayaking, and water skiing. It has essentially no industry, the main employer is a large convalescence home. There are many shops (butcher, baker, etc...) and one small supermarket.

Sucé-sur-Erdre has had few encounters with history, its greatest claim to fame being that the famous philosopher René Descartes spent some time there (although this is not very well documented). It has a few old houses, but the church is modern (late nineteenth century. There are many picturesque farm houses in the area, although they are disappearing quickly due to the accelerated modernization brought by the expansion of Nantes.

== Population ==
The inhabitants of Sucé-sur-Erdre are called Sucéens in French.

Historical population
| Year | Pop. | ±% p.a. |
|---|---|---|
| 1968 | 1,696 | — |
| 1975 | 2,346 | +4.74% |
| 1982 | 4,135 | +8.43% |
| 1990 | 4,806 | +1.90% |
| 1999 | 5,868 | +2.24% |
| 2007 | 6,141 | +0.57% |
| 2012 | 6,473 | +1.06% |
| 2017 | 7,023 | +1.64% |
| 2023 | 7,539 | +1.19% |
Source: INSEE

== Facts and statistics ==
- Sister cities: Cricklade (United Kingdom), Kleinblittersdorf (Germany)
- Climate: mild, often wet

== See also ==
- Communes of the Loire-Atlantique department
- Official site of Sucé sur Erdre (in French)
- Official site of Sucé sur Erdre (in English via Google Translate)
