= Les Touches =

- Commune
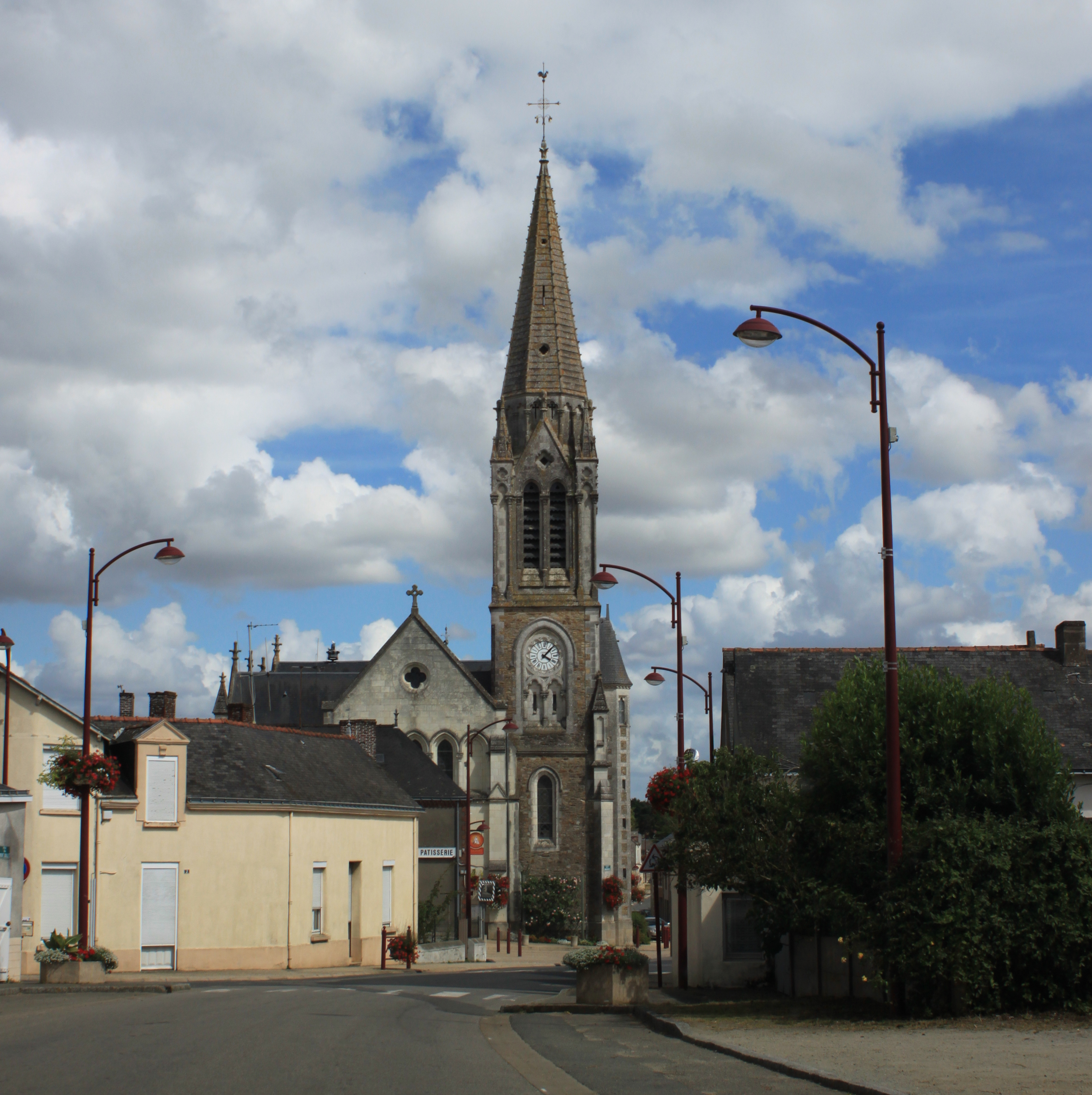
- The church of Sainte-Melaine, in Les Touches

- Coat of arms
- Location of Les Touches
- Location within France Location within Pays de la Loire
- Coordinates: 47°26′34″N 1°25′46″W
- Country: France
- Region: Pays de la Loire
- Department: Loire-Atlantique
- Arrondissement: Châteaubriant-Ancenis
- Canton: Nort-sur-Erdre
- Intercommunality: Erdre et Gesvres

Government
  - Mayor (2020–2026): Laurence Guillemine
- Area^{1}: 35.15 km^{2} (13.57 sq mi)
- Highest elevation: 52 m (171 ft)
- Lowest elevation: 3 m (9.8 ft)
- Population (2023): 2,638
  - Density: 75.05/km^{2} (194.4/sq mi)
- Demonym: Touchois
- Time zone: UTC+01:00 (CET)
  - Summer (DST): UTC+02:00 (CEST)
- INSEE/Postal code: 44205 /44390
- Website: www.lestouches.fr
- ^{1} French Land Register data, which excludes lakes, ponds, glaciers > 1 km^{2} (0.386 sq mi or 247 acres) and river estuaries.

Les Touches (French pronunciation: [le tuʃ]; Breton: An Dosenneg) is a commune in the Loire-Atlantique department in western France.

== Population ==
Historical population
Year	Pop.	±% p.a.
1968	1,326	—
1975	1,359	+0.35%
1982	1,633	+2.66%
1990	1,935	+2.14%
1999	1,950	+0.09%
2007	2,105	+0.96%
2012	2,415	+2.79%
2017	2,474	+0.48%
2023	2,638	+1.08%
Source: INSEE

== See also ==
- Communes of the Loire-Atlantique department
