= Trans-sur-Erdre =

- Commune
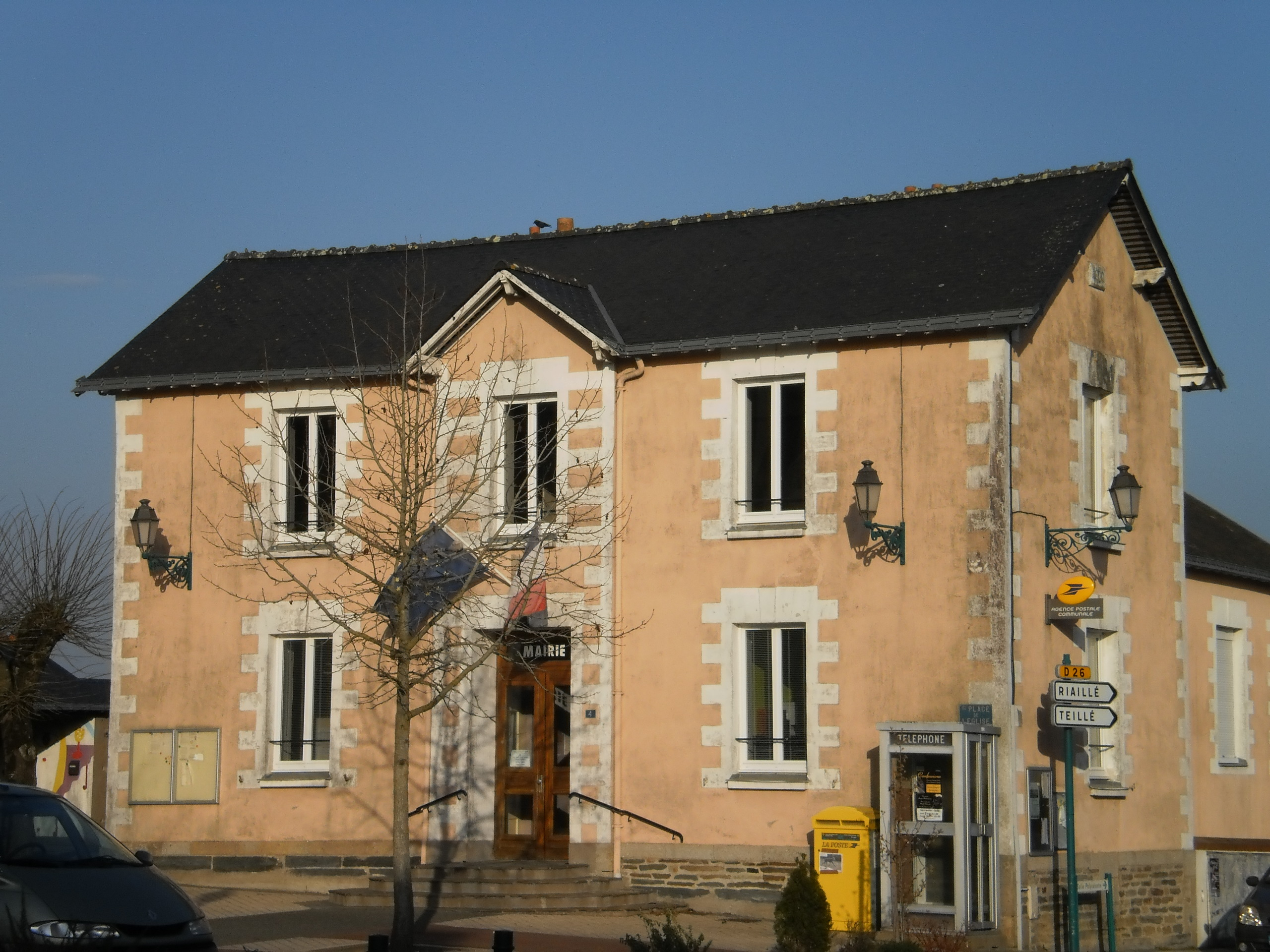
- The town hall in Trans-sur-Erdre

- Coat of arms
- Location of Trans-sur-Erdre
- Location within France Location within Pays de la Loire
- Coordinates: 47°28′38″N 1°22′20″W
- Country: France
- Region: Pays de la Loire
- Department: Loire-Atlantique
- Arrondissement: Châteaubriant-Ancenis
- Canton: Nort-sur-Erdre
- Intercommunality: Pays d'Ancenis

Government
  - Mayor (2021–2026): Xavier Loubert-Davaine
- Area^{1}: 22.56 km^{2} (8.71 sq mi)
- Highest elevation: 57 m (187 ft)
- Lowest elevation: 17 m (56 ft)
- Population (2023): 1,156
  - Density: 51.24/km^{2} (132.7/sq mi)
- Demonym(s): Transéennes, Transéens
- Time zone: UTC+01:00 (CET)
  - Summer (DST): UTC+02:00 (CEST)
- INSEE/Postal code: 44207 /44440
- Website: http://www.pays-ancenis.fr/
- ^{1} French Land Register data, which excludes lakes, ponds, glaciers > 1 km^{2} (0.386 sq mi or 247 acres) and river estuaries.

Trans-sur-Erdre (Breton: Treuz war an Kantren) is a commune in the Loire-Atlantique department in western France.

== See also ==
- Communes of the Loire-Atlantique department
