= Teillé, Loire-Atlantique =

Teillé Teilhaé (Gallo) Tilhieg (Breton)
- Commune
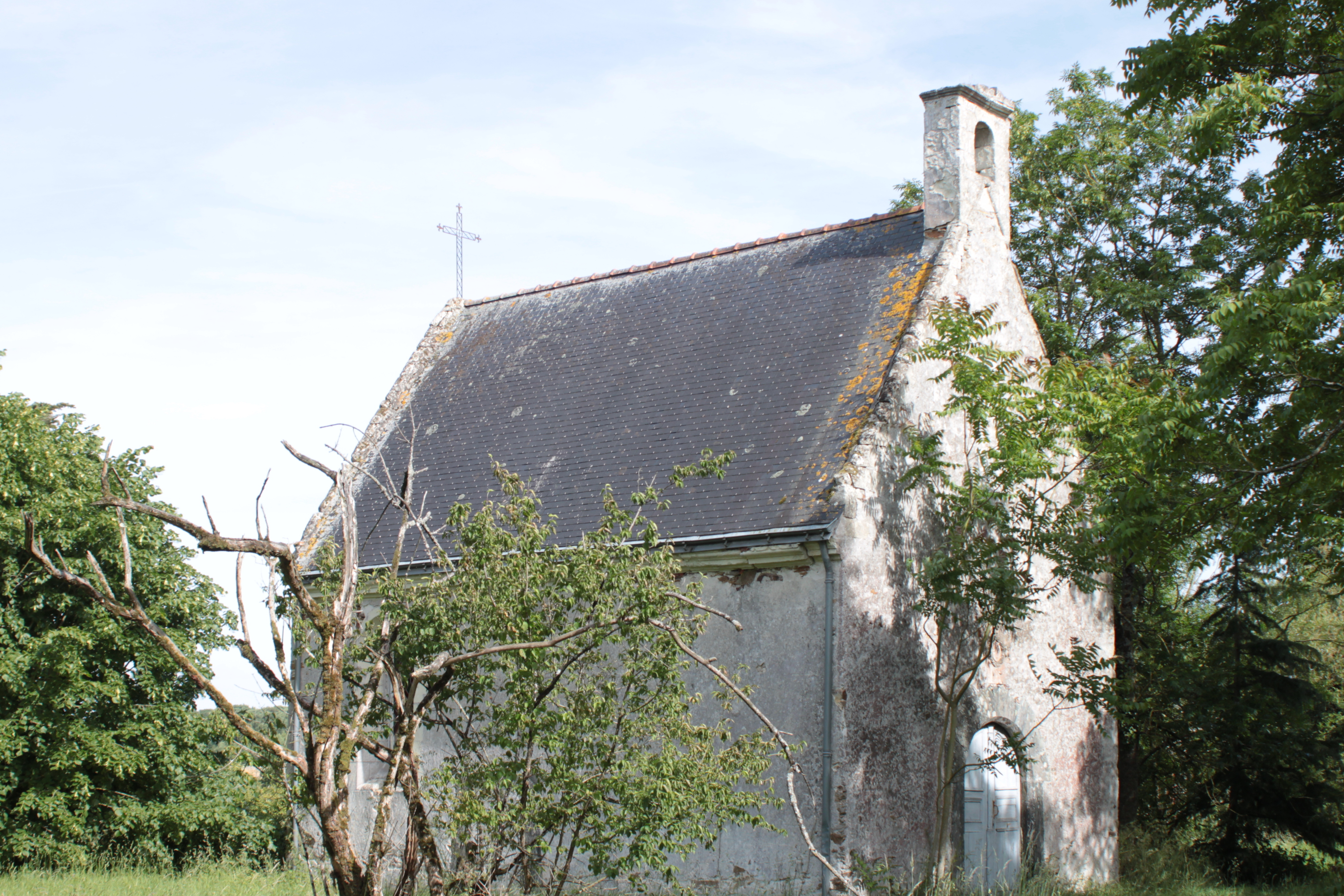
- The chapel of the château de la Guibourgère, in Teillé
- Location of Teillé
- Location within France Location within Pays de la Loire
- Coordinates: 47°27′45″N 1°16′42″W
- Country: France
- Region: Pays de la Loire
- Department: Loire-Atlantique
- Arrondissement: Châteaubriant-Ancenis
- Canton: Nort-sur-Erdre
- Intercommunality: Pays d'Ancenis

Government
  - Mayor (2020–2026): Arnaud Pageaud
- Area^{1}: 28.55 km^{2} (11.02 sq mi)
- Highest elevation: 64 m (210 ft)
- Lowest elevation: 17 m (56 ft)
- Population (2023): 1,824
  - Density: 63.89/km^{2} (165.5/sq mi)
- Demonym(s): Teilléens, Teilléennes
- Time zone: UTC+01:00 (CET)
  - Summer (DST): UTC+02:00 (CEST)
- INSEE/Postal code: 44202 /44440
- Website: http://www.pays-ancenis.fr/
- ^{1} French Land Register data, which excludes lakes, ponds, glaciers > 1 km^{2} (0.386 sq mi or 247 acres) and river estuaries.

Teillé (French pronunciation: [tɛje]; Gallo: Teilhaé, Breton: Tilhieg) is a commune in the Loire-Atlantique department in western France.

== See also ==
- Communes of the Loire-Atlantique department
