= Riaillé =

Riaillé Riâlhë (Gallo) Rialeg (Breton)
- Commune
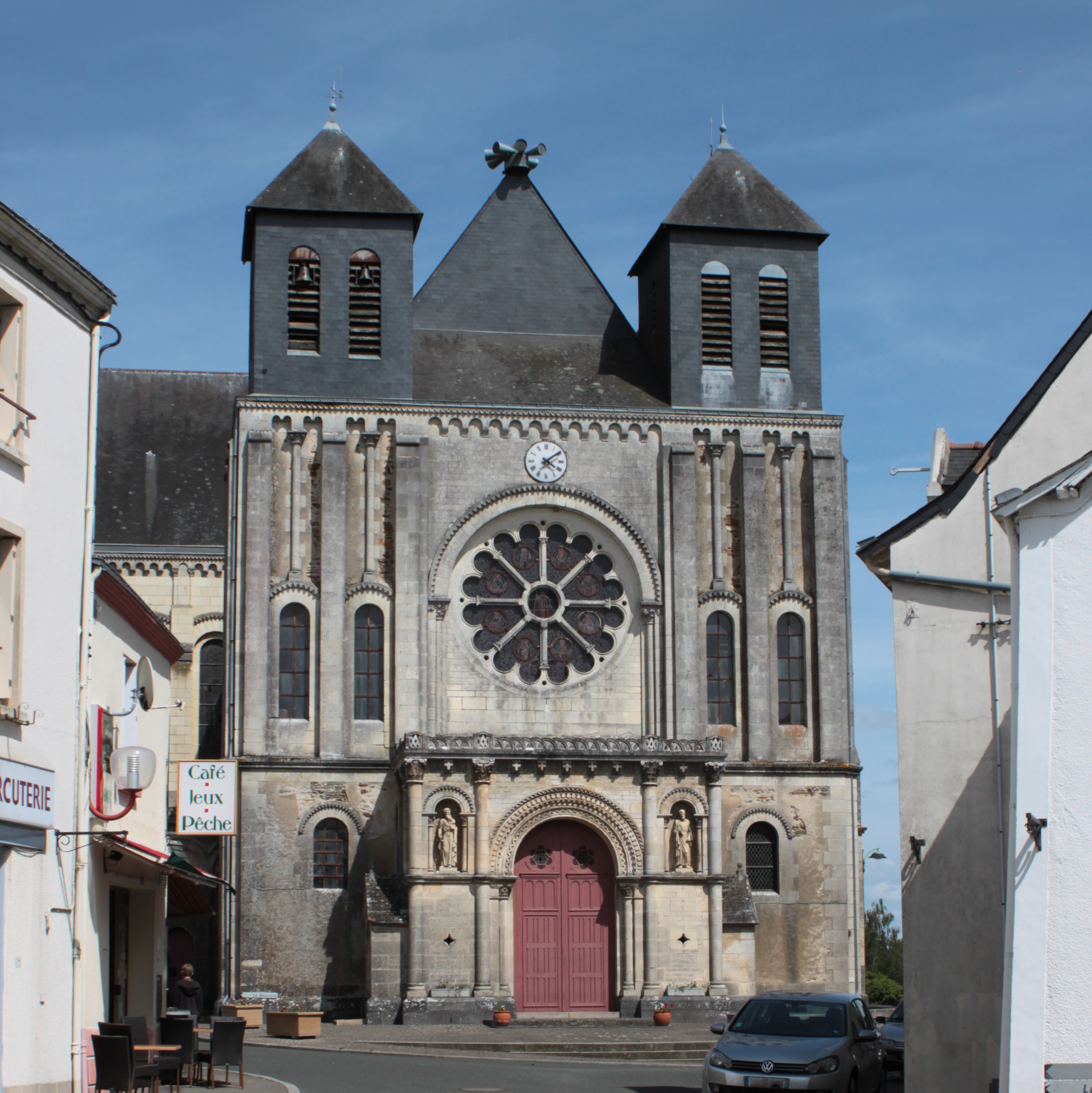

- Coat of arms
- Location of Riaillé
- Location within France Location within Pays de la Loire
- Coordinates: 47°31′11″N 1°17′39″W
- Country: France
- Region: Pays de la Loire
- Department: Loire-Atlantique
- Arrondissement: Châteaubriant-Ancenis
- Canton: Nort-sur-Erdre
- Intercommunality: Pays d'Ancenis

Government
  - Mayor (2020–2026): André Raitière
- Area^{1}: 50.02 km^{2} (19.31 sq mi)
- Highest elevation: 88 m (289 ft)
- Lowest elevation: 17 m (56 ft)
- Population (2023): 2,365
  - Density: 47.28/km^{2} (122.5/sq mi)
- Time zone: UTC+01:00 (CET)
  - Summer (DST): UTC+02:00 (CEST)
- INSEE/Postal code: 44144 /44440
- ^{1} French Land Register data, which excludes lakes, ponds, glaciers > 1 km^{2} (0.386 sq mi or 247 acres) and river estuaries.

Riaillé (French pronunciation: [ʁjaje]; Gallo: Riâlhë, Breton: Rialeg) is a commune in the Loire-Atlantique department in western France.

== Population ==
Historical population

Year	Pop.	±% p.a.
1793	1,445	—
1821	1,711	+0.61%
1846	1,926	+0.47%
1872	2,213	+0.54%
1901	2,131	−0.13%
1926	1,841	−0.58%
1946	1,734	−0.30%
1962	1,720	−0.05%
1968	1,739	+0.18%

Year	Pop.	±% p.a.
1975	1,677	−0.52%
1982	1,655	−0.19%
1990	1,735	+0.59%
1999	1,721	−0.09%
2007	2,006	+1.93%
2012	2,201	+1.87%
2017	2,333	+1.17%
2023	2,365	+0.23%

Source: EHESS and INSEE (1968-2023)

== See also ==
- Communes of the Loire-Atlantique department
