= Nort-sur-Erdre =

- Commune
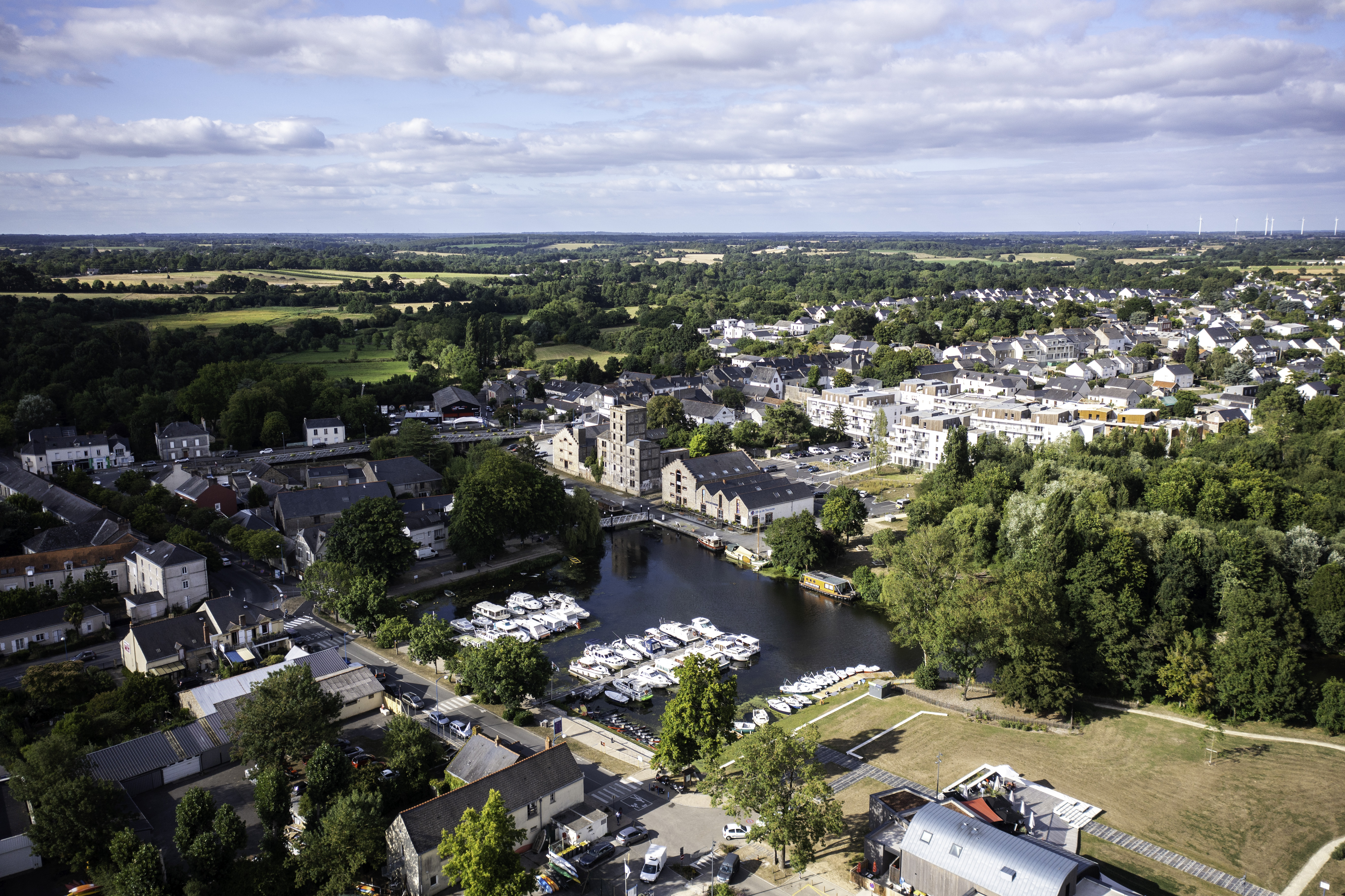
- Aerial view of Nort-sur-Erdre

- Flag Coat of arms
- Location of Nort-sur-Erdre
- Location within France Location within Pays de la Loire
- Coordinates: 47°26′25″N 1°29′50″W
- Country: France
- Region: Pays de la Loire
- Department: Loire-Atlantique
- Arrondissement: Châteaubriant-Ancenis
- Canton: Nort-sur-Erdre
- Intercommunality: Erdre et Gesvres

Government
  - Mayor (2020–2026): Yves Dauvé
- Area^{1}: 66.56 km^{2} (25.70 sq mi)
- Highest elevation: 73 m (240 ft)
- Lowest elevation: 2 m (6.6 ft)
- Population (2023): 9,570
  - Density: 144/km^{2} (372/sq mi)
- Time zone: UTC+01:00 (CET)
  - Summer (DST): UTC+02:00 (CEST)
- INSEE/Postal code: 44110 /44390
- ^{1} French Land Register data, which excludes lakes, ponds, glaciers > 1 km^{2} (0.386 sq mi or 247 acres) and river estuaries.

Nort-sur-Erdre (French pronunciation: [nɔʁ syʁ ɛʁdʁ], literally Nort on Erdre; Breton: Enorzh) is a commune in the Loire-Atlantique department in western France. It is on the river Erdre north of Nantes.

== Population ==
Historical population

Year	Pop.	±% p.a.
1793	3,579	—
1800	3,180	−1.67%
1806	3,858	+3.27%
1821	4,409	+0.89%
1831	4,751	+0.75%
1841	5,561	+1.59%
1846	5,615	+0.19%
1851	5,617	+0.01%
1856	5,537	−0.29%
1861	5,665	+0.46%
1866	5,415	−0.90%
1872	5,386	−0.09%
1876	5,765	+1.71%
1881	5,445	−1.14%
1886	5,467	+0.08%
1891	5,346	−0.45%
1896	5,150	−0.74%
1901	5,423	+1.04%

Year	Pop.	±% p.a.
1906	5,379	−0.16%
1911	5,149	−0.87%
1921	4,809	−0.68%
1926	4,543	−1.13%
1931	4,374	−0.76%
1936	4,182	−0.89%
1946	4,296	+0.27%
1954	4,147	−0.44%
1962	4,222	+0.22%
1968	4,436	+0.83%
1975	4,606	+0.54%
1982	5,050	+1.32%
1990	5,362	+0.75%
1999	5,885	+1.04%
2007	7,197	+2.55%
2012	8,160	+2.54%
2017	8,763	+1.44%
2023	9,570	+1.48%

Source: EHESS and INSEE (1968-2023)

== See also ==
- Communes of the Loire-Atlantique department
- Jean Fréour
