= Pierre-Auguste Lamy =

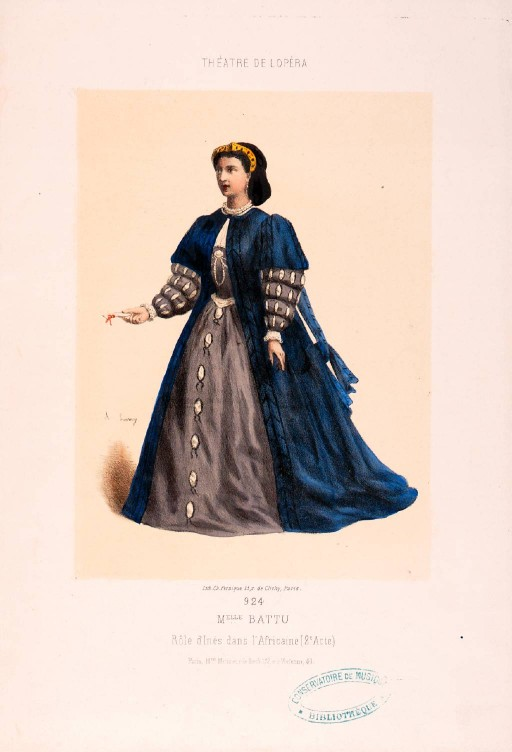
- Marie Battu playing Ines in L'Africaine by Giacomo Meyerbeer. Hand-coloured lithograph (c. 1865); Charles Fernique, lithographer.
- Born: 1 July 1827; Paris
- Died: 6 October 1883 (aged 56); Paris
- Known for: Engraving, lithography, watercolors
- Spouse(s): Henriette Claire Dobremel (m. 1855) (1821–1898)

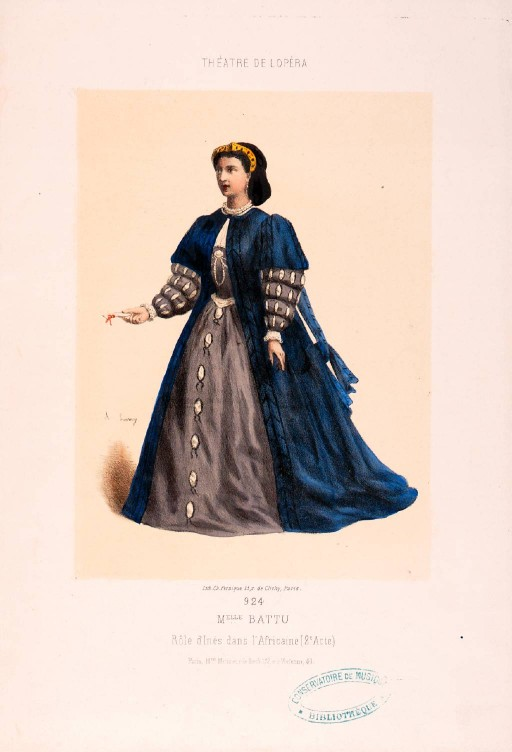
Marie Battu playing Ines in L'Africaine by Giacomo Meyerbeer. Hand-coloured lithograph by Pierre-Auguste Lamy (v. 1865).

Pierre-Auguste Lamy (1 July 1827 – 6 October 1883) was a French engraver, lithographer and watercolourist.

== Life ==
Pierre-Auguste Lamy's parents – Jean Martin Lamy (1780–1841) and Marie Elisabeth Quentin (1785–1854) – were married in Paris April 14, 1812. Pierre-Auguste Lamy married Henriette Claire Dobremel (1821–1898) in Paris on February 3, 1855. Lamy made his debut at the Salon of 1850. Pierre-Auguste Lamy died at his home, 35, rue des Jeûneurs (fr), October 6, 1883.

== Lithographs by Pierre-Auguste Lamy for La Fiancée d'Abydos ==
La Fiancée d'Abydos, premiered 30 December 1865 at the Théâtre-Lyrique

- Libretto: Jules Adenis
- Music: Adrien Barthe
- Mise en scène: Léon Carvalho
- Lithographies: Pierre-Auguste Lamy
- Décorateurs: Joseph Thierry and Charles-Antoine Cambon
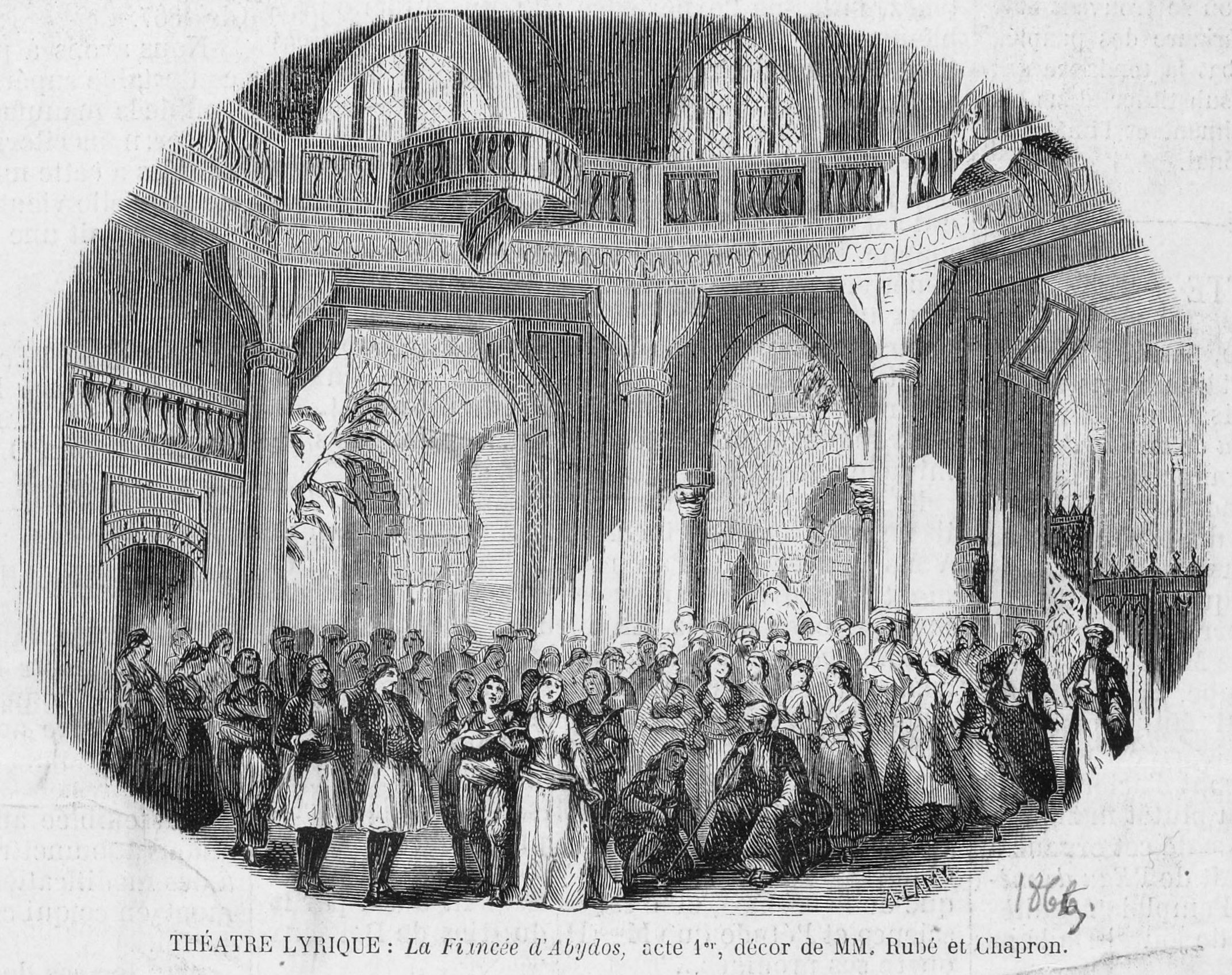
Act 1, scene 4

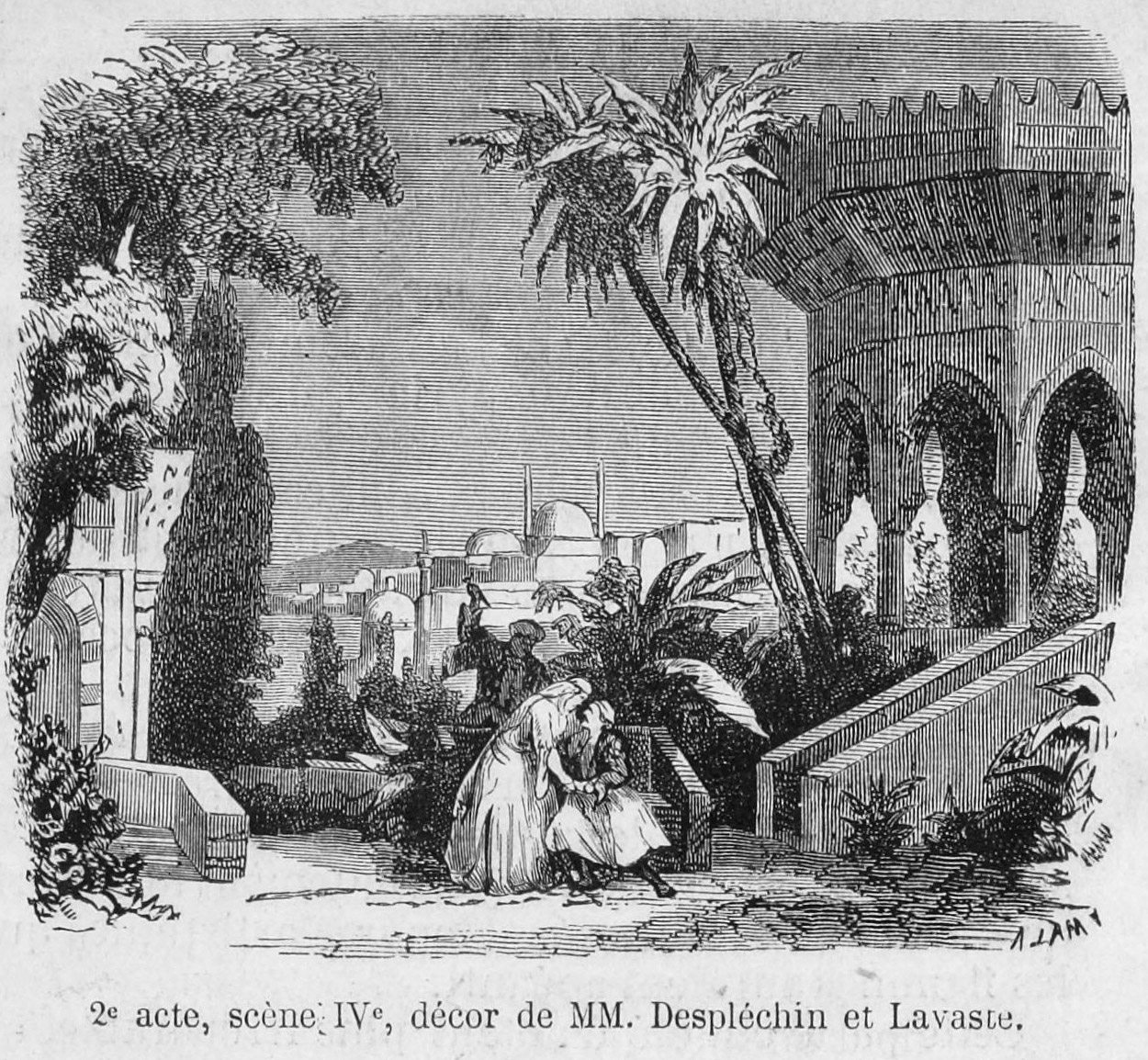
Act 2, scene 4

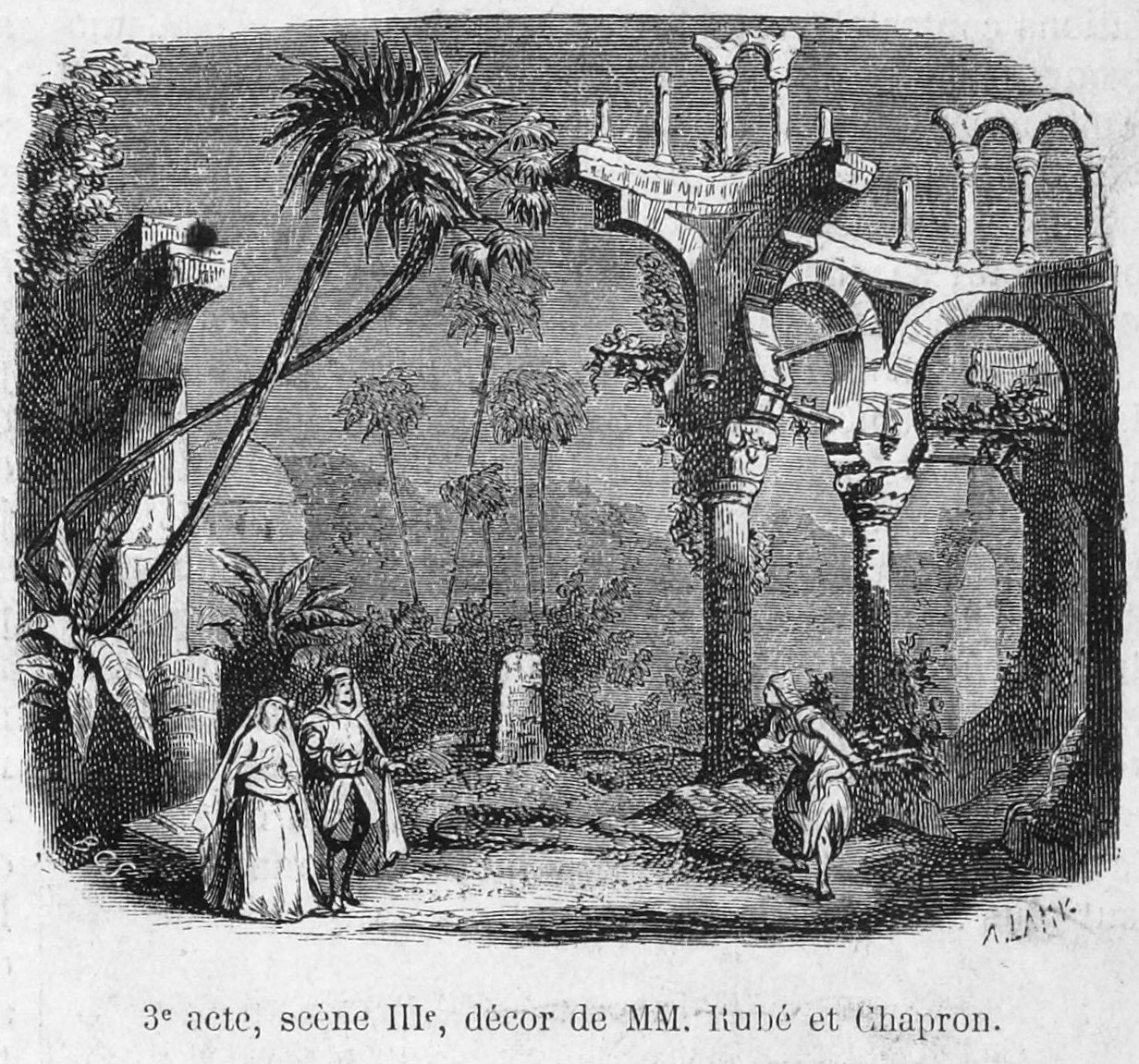
Act 3, scene 3

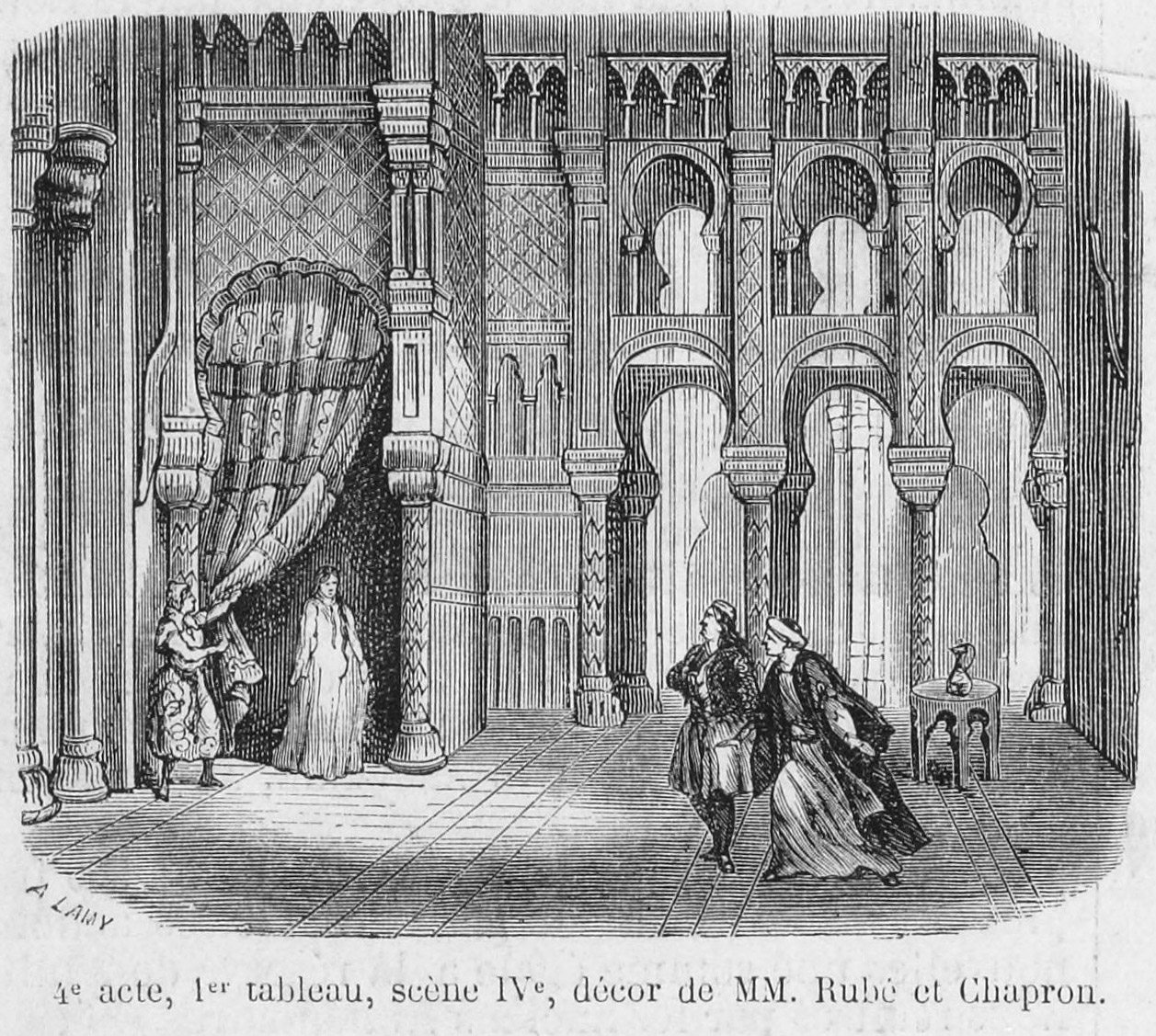
Act 4, 1er tableau, scene 4

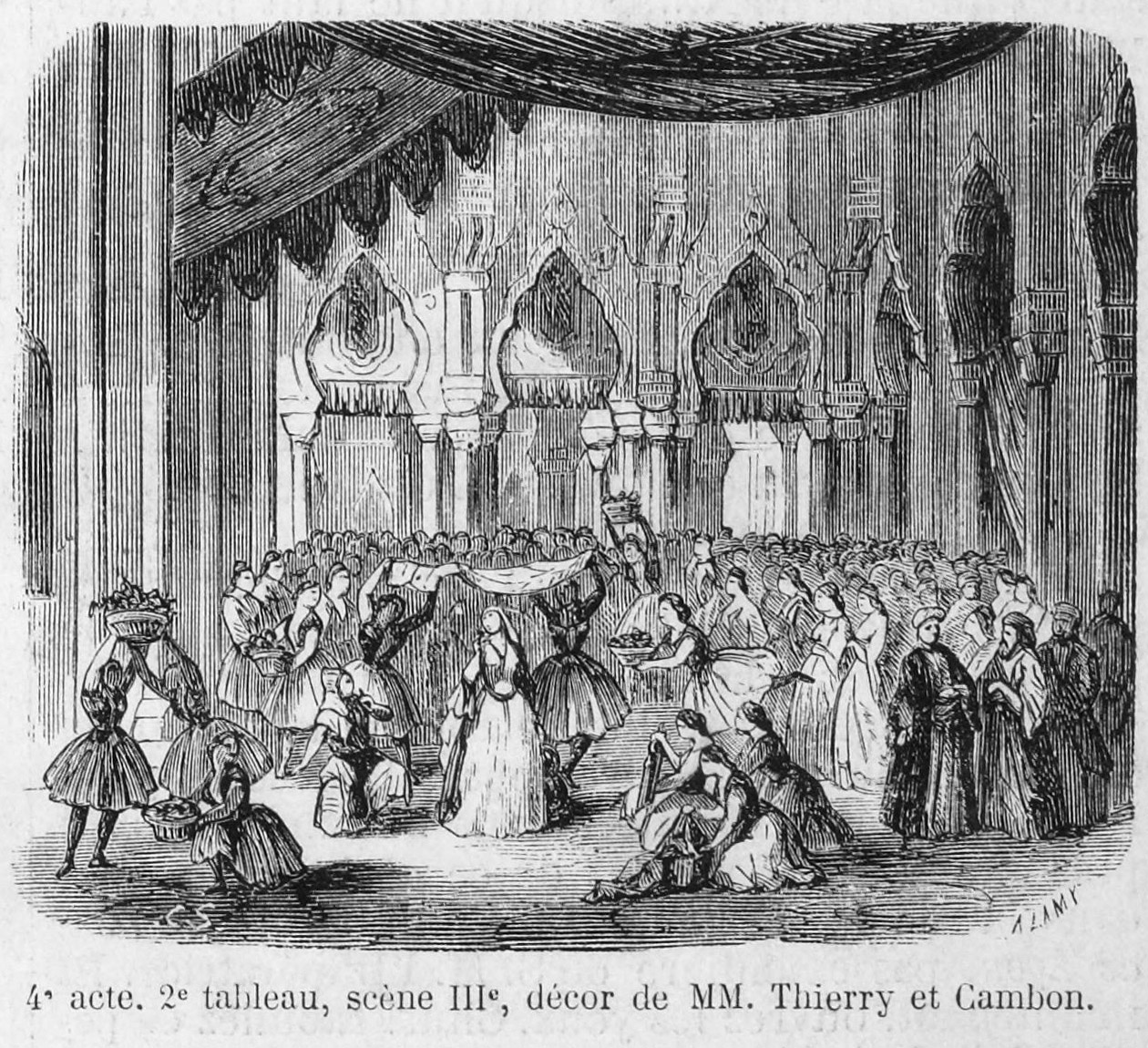
Acte 4, 2nd tableau, scene 3

== Other works ==
1. Cadre contenant deux lithographies, d'après M. Vilain (fr)
  [Frame containing two lithographs, after Mr. Vilain] — Salon 1850
2. Le fou qui vend la sagesse, d'après M. P. Leray
  [The Madman Who Sells Wisdom, after Mr. P. Leray], lithograph — Salon 1853
3. Tépidarium, d'après M. Th. Chassériau
  [Tepidarium, after Mr. Th. Chassériau], lithograph — Salon 1855
4. Une mêlée, d'après Salvator Rosa
  [A Skirmish, after Salvator Rosa], lithograph — Salon 1857
5. Une pensée, d'après Prud'hon
  [A thought, after Prud'hon], lithograph — Salon 1857
6. La jeune mère, d'après M. Trayer
  [The Young Mother, after Mr. Trayer], lithograph — Salon 1859
7. Sarah la baigneuse, d'après M. Tassaert
  [Sarah the Bather, after Mr. Tassaert], lithograph — Salon 1859
8. Le bouquet, d'après M. A. Stevens
  [The Bouquet, after Mr. A. Stevens], lithograph — Salon 1864
9. La dévideuse, d'après la statue de M. Salmson (fr)
  [The Thread Spinner, after the statue of Mr. Salmson], etching — Salon 1865
10. Hypathie, d'après la statue de M. Gaston-Guitton
  [Hypatia, after the statue of Mr. Gaston-Guitton]
  (Gaston Victor Édouard Gustave Guitton; 1825–1891), etching — Salon 1865
11. Intérieur, d'après Rembrandt
  [Interior, after Rembrandt], lithograph — Salon 1865
12. Un chanteur, d'après M. A. Zo
  [A Singer, after Mr. A. Zo]
  (Alcide Joseph Lorentz Zo; 1820–1884), lithograph — Salon 1865
13. La pourvoijeuse misère, d'après M. Glaize
  [The Provider of Misery, after Mr. Glaize], lithograph — Salon 1866
14. Orphée, d'après M. G. Moreau
  [Orpheus, after Mr. G. Moreau], etching — Salon 1867
15. Le Tépidarium, d'après Chasseriau
  [The Tepidarium, after Chasseriau], lithographs — Salon 1869
16. La Volupté, d'après Prud'hon
  [Voluptuousness, after Prud'hon], lithograph — Salon 1869
17. La liseuse, d'après M. Ch. Hue
  [The Reader, after Mr. Ch. Hue
  (Charles Désiré Hue; 1833–1899), etching — Salon 1870
18. Le laboratoire de Mme de Warens, d'après M. Ch. Hue
  [The Laboratory of Madame de Warens, after Mr. Ch. Hue]
  (Charles Désiré Hue; 1833–1899), lithograph — Salon 1870
19. La lecture, d'après M. Hue
  [Reading, after Mr. Hue]
  (Charles Désiré Hue; 1833–1899), etching — Salon 1877
20. Le poète Florentin, d'après M. Cabanel
  [The Florentine Poet, after Mr. Cabanel], lithograph — Salon 1879
21. Un café sur les rives du Danube, d'après de Tournemine
  [A Café on the Banks of the Danube, after Tournemine], lithograph — Salon 1879
22. La nymphe Sinois
  [The Sinois Nymph], watercolor — Salon 1880

== Bibliography ==
=== References ===
- Bellier de la Chavignerie & Auvray (1882). Dictionnaire général des artistes de l'école française depuis l'origine des arts du dessin jusqu'à nos jours. Architectes, peintres, sculpteurs, graveurs et lithographes [General Dictionary of Artists of the French School from the Origin of the Arts of Drawing to the Present Day. Architects, Painters, Sculptors, Engravers, and Lithographers]. Vol. 1. Work begun by Émile Bellier de la Chavignerie (1821–1871); continued by Louis Auvray (1810–1890). Paris: Librairie Renouard, H. Loones, Successor, 6, Rue de Tournon, 6. pp. 893–894. Retrieved September 17, 2024. LCCN 12-6444; OCLC 763990888 (all editions).
1. Via Internet Archive (Getty Research Institute).
- Exposition Universelle de 1855: Explication des ouvrages de peinture, sculpture, gravure, lithographie et architecture des artistes vivants étrangers et français, exposés au Palais des Beaux-Arts Avenue Montaigne, le 15 mai 1855 [Explanation of the works of painting, sculpture, engraving, lithography and architecture of living foreign and French artists, exhibited at the Palais des Beaux-Arts Avenue Montaigne, May 15, 1855]. Paris: Se Trouve Chez Panis, Place de la Bourse, 10 [Can be found at Panis, 10 Place de la Bourse]. Vinchon, imprimeur des Musées Impériaux, rue J.-J. Rousseau, 8 [Vinchon, printer for the Imperial Museums, 8 J.-J. Rousseau Street.] → Jean Baptiste Auguste Vinchon (1789–1855). 1855. p. 536.
1. Via Internet Archive (Getty Research Institute).
- Salon de 1864: Explication des ouvrages de peinture, sculpture, architecture, gravure et lithographie des artistes vivants, exposés au Palais des Champs-Élysées le 1^{er} mai 1864. Paris: Charles de Mourgues Frères. Successeurs de Vinchon, imprimeurs des Musées Impériaux, rue J.-J. Rousseau, 8 [Charles de Mourgues Frères. Successors of Vinchon, printers of the Imperial Museums, 8 J.-J. Rousseau Street]. 1866.
1. Via Internet Archive (Getty Research Institute).
- Salon de 1866: Explication des ouvrages de peinture, sculpture, architecture, gravure et lithographie des artistes vivants, des envois des pensionnaires de L'Académie de France à Rome, et des grands prix de 1865 exposés au Palais des Champs-Élysées le 1^{er} mai 1866 [Explanation of the Works of Painting, Sculpture, Architecture, Engraving, and Lithography by Living Artists, Submissions From the Pensioners of the French Academy in Rome, and the Grand Prizes of 1865, Exhibited at the Palais Des Champs-Élysées on May 1, 1866]. Paris: Charles de Mourgues Frères. Successeurs de Vinchon, imprimeurs des Musées Impériaux, rue J.-J. Rousseau, 8 [Charles de Mourgues Frères. Successors of Vinchon, printers of the Imperial Museums, 8 J.-J. Rousseau Street]. 1866.
1. Via Internet Archive (Getty Research Institute).
