= Sautron =

- Commune
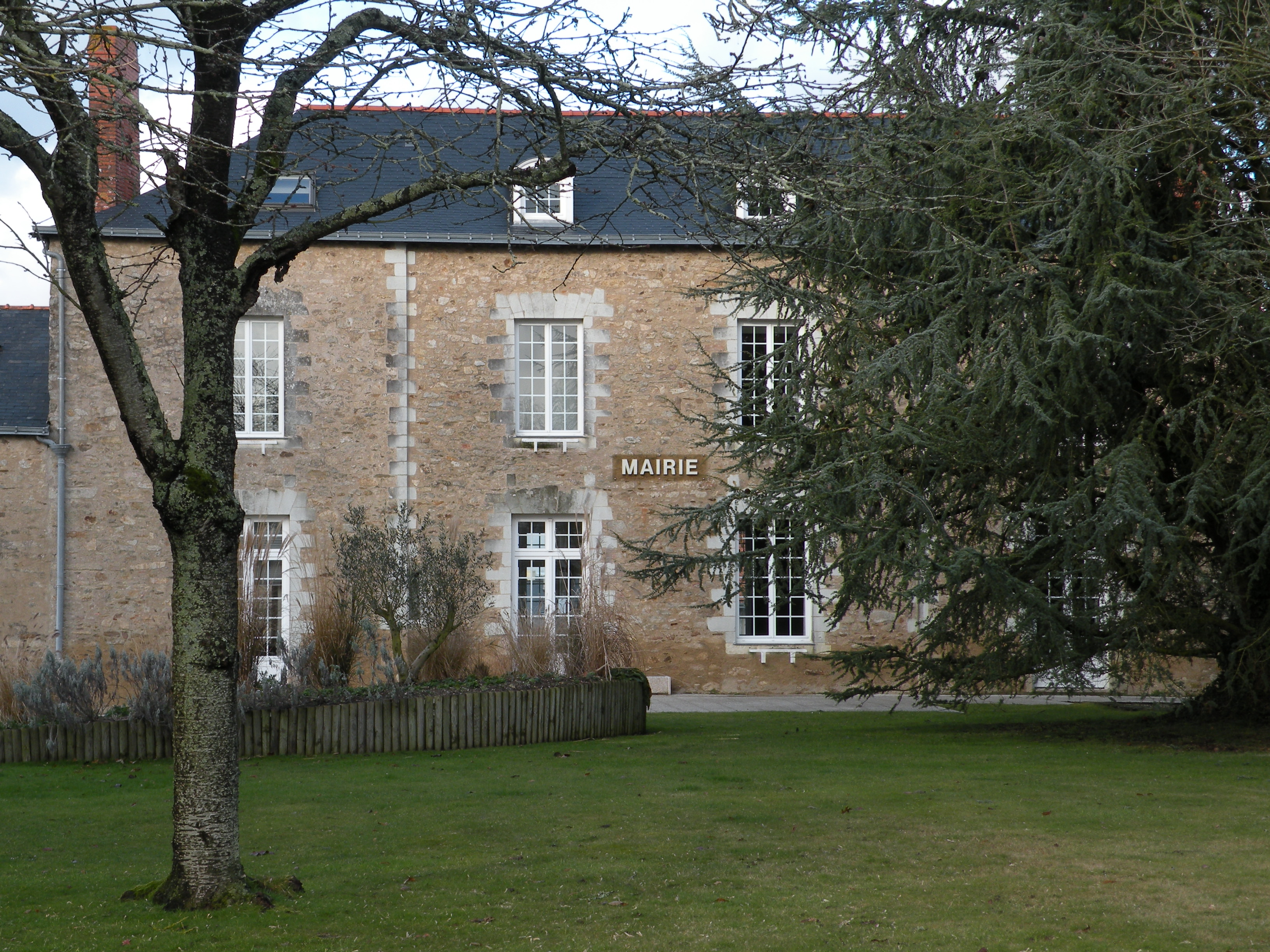
- L'hôtel de ville.
- Location of Sautron
- Location within France Location within Pays de la Loire
- Coordinates: 47°15′52″N 1°40′00″W
- Country: France
- Region: Pays de la Loire
- Department: Loire-Atlantique
- Arrondissement: Nantes
- Canton: Saint-Herblain-1
- Intercommunality: Nantes Métropole

Government
  - Mayor (2020–2026): Marie-Cécile Gessant
- Area^{1}: 17.28 km^{2} (6.67 sq mi)
- Highest elevation: 80 m (260 ft)
- Lowest elevation: 25 m (82 ft)
- Population (2023): 8,555
  - Density: 495.1/km^{2} (1,282/sq mi)
- Demonym(s): Sautronnaise, Sautronnais
- Time zone: UTC+01:00 (CET)
  - Summer (DST): UTC+02:00 (CEST)
- INSEE/Postal code: 44194 /44880
- Website: www.sautron.fr
- ^{1} French Land Register data, which excludes lakes, ponds, glaciers > 1 km^{2} (0.386 sq mi or 247 acres) and river estuaries.

Sautron (French pronunciation: [sotʁɔ̃]; Breton: Saotron) is a commune in the Loire-Atlantique département in western France.

== Geography ==
Position of Sautron in the département of Loire-Atlantique

Sautron is located 10 km north west of Nantes, close to the Nantes-Vannes expressway.

Surrounding communes are Vigneux-de-Bretagne, Orvault, Saint-Herblain and Couëron.

According to the classification established by INSEE, Sautron is a commune urbaine (urban commune), one of 22 communes in the suburban area of Nantes.

== Population ==
Historical population
Year	Pop.	±% p.a.
1968	1,333	—
1975	2,849	+11.46%
1982	4,692	+7.39%
1990	6,026	+3.18%
1999	6,824	+1.39%
2007	6,806	−0.03%
2012	6,989	+0.53%
2017	8,192	+3.23%
2023	8,555	+0.73%
Source: INSEE

== Sites and monuments ==
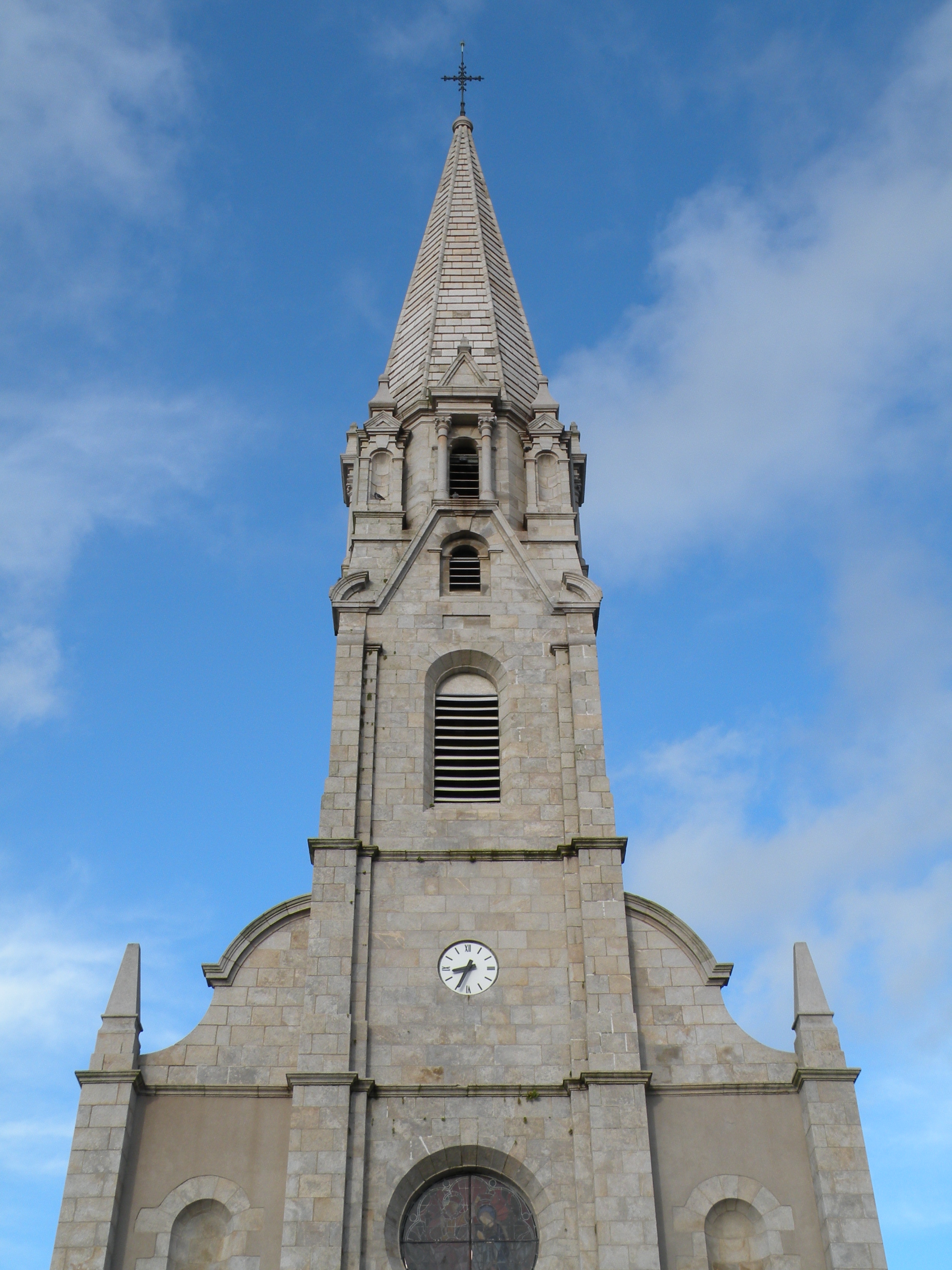
The church

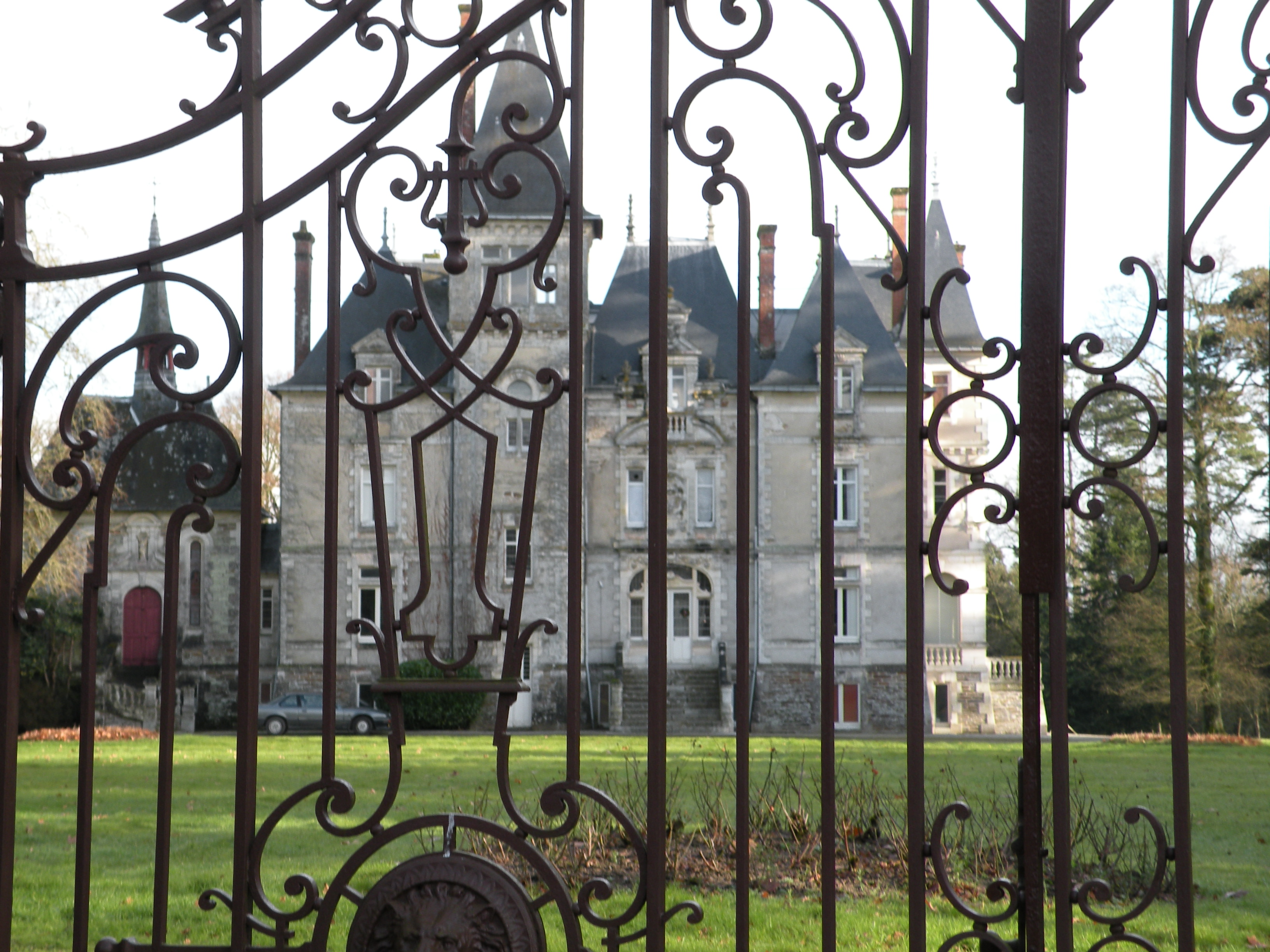
The Château des Croix

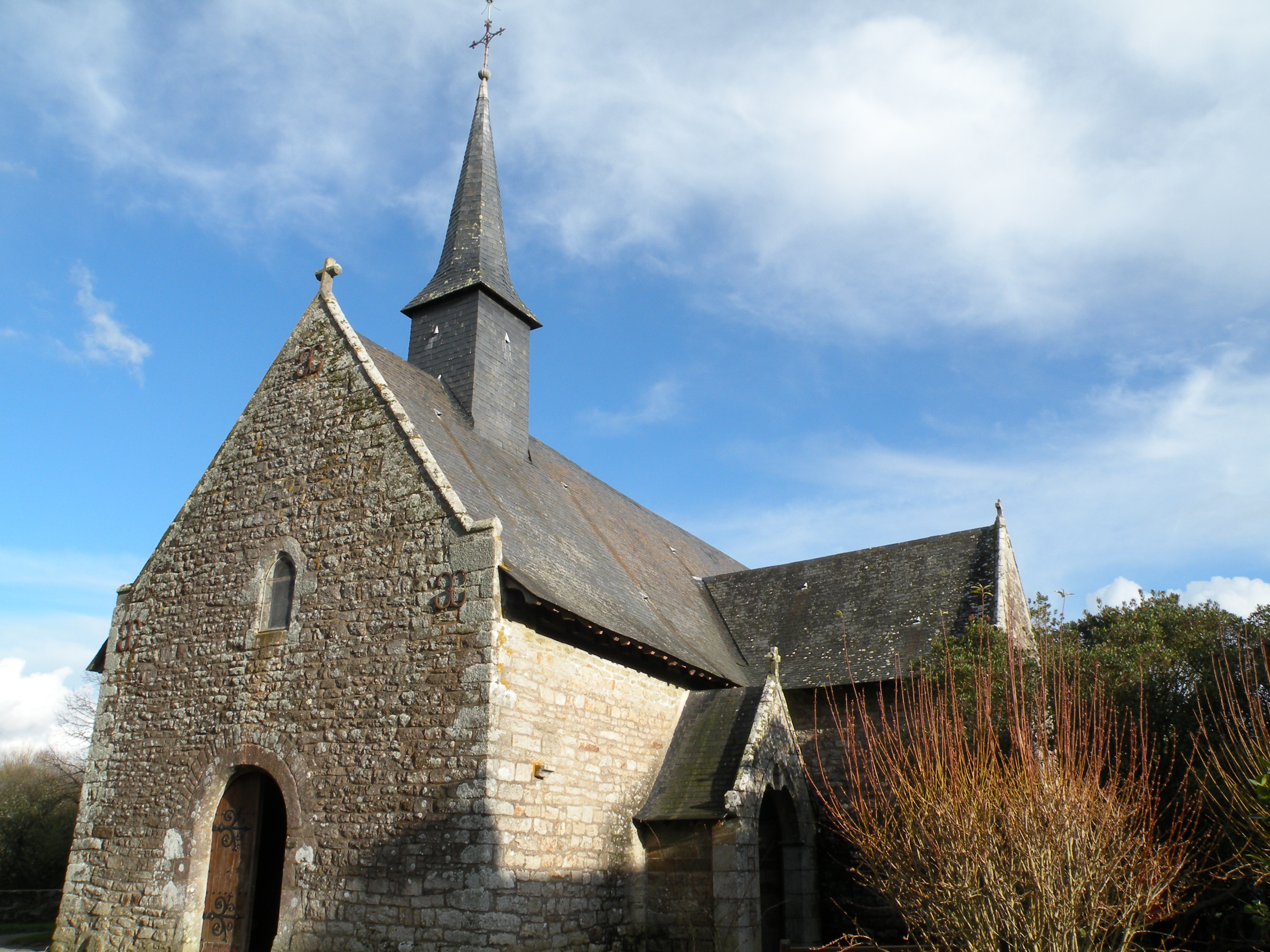
Chapelle de Bongarant

== See also ==
- Communes of the Loire-Atlantique department
