= Couëron =

Couëron Coéron/Couéron (Gallo) Koeron (Breton)
- Commune
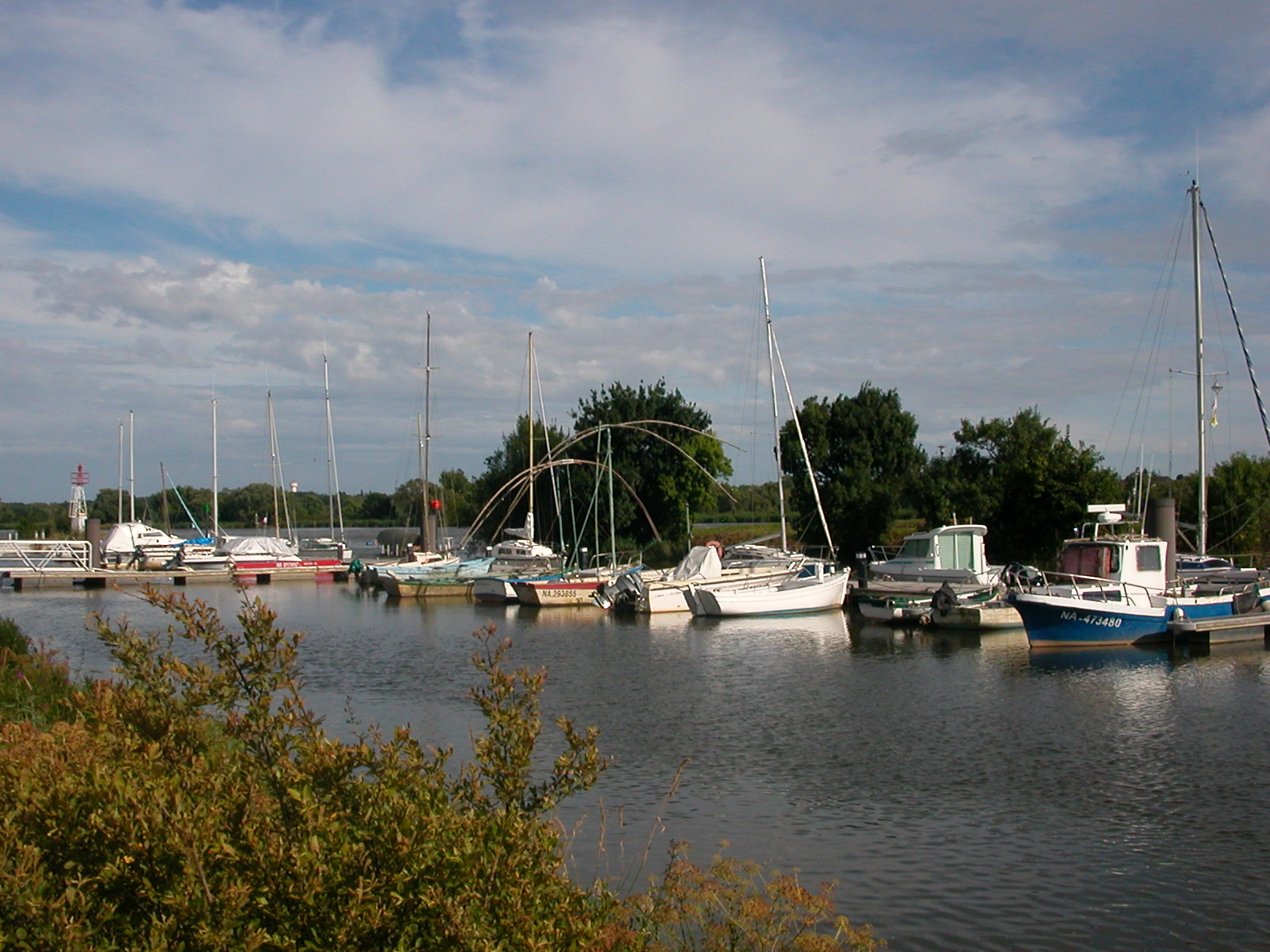
- Port on the Loire
- Location of Couëron
- Location within France Location within Pays de la Loire
- Coordinates: 47°12′56″N 1°43′22″W
- Country: France
- Region: Pays de la Loire
- Department: Loire-Atlantique
- Arrondissement: Nantes
- Canton: Saint-Herblain-1
- Intercommunality: Nantes Métropole

Government
  - Mayor (2020–2026): Carole Grelaud
- Area^{1}: 44.03 km^{2} (17.00 sq mi)
- Highest elevation: 74 m (243 ft)
- Lowest elevation: 0 m (0 ft)
- Population (2023): 24,103
  - Density: 547.4/km^{2} (1,418/sq mi)
- Time zone: UTC+01:00 (CET)
  - Summer (DST): UTC+02:00 (CEST)
- INSEE/Postal code: 44047 /44220
- ^{1} French Land Register data, which excludes lakes, ponds, glaciers > 1 km^{2} (0.386 sq mi or 247 acres) and river estuaries.

Couëron (French: [kwɛʁɔ̃]; Gallo: Coéron or Couéron, Breton: Koeron) is a commune in the Loire-Atlantique department in western France. It is part of the historic French Brittany.

Couëron is one of the 24 communes of the Nantes Métropole.

== History ==
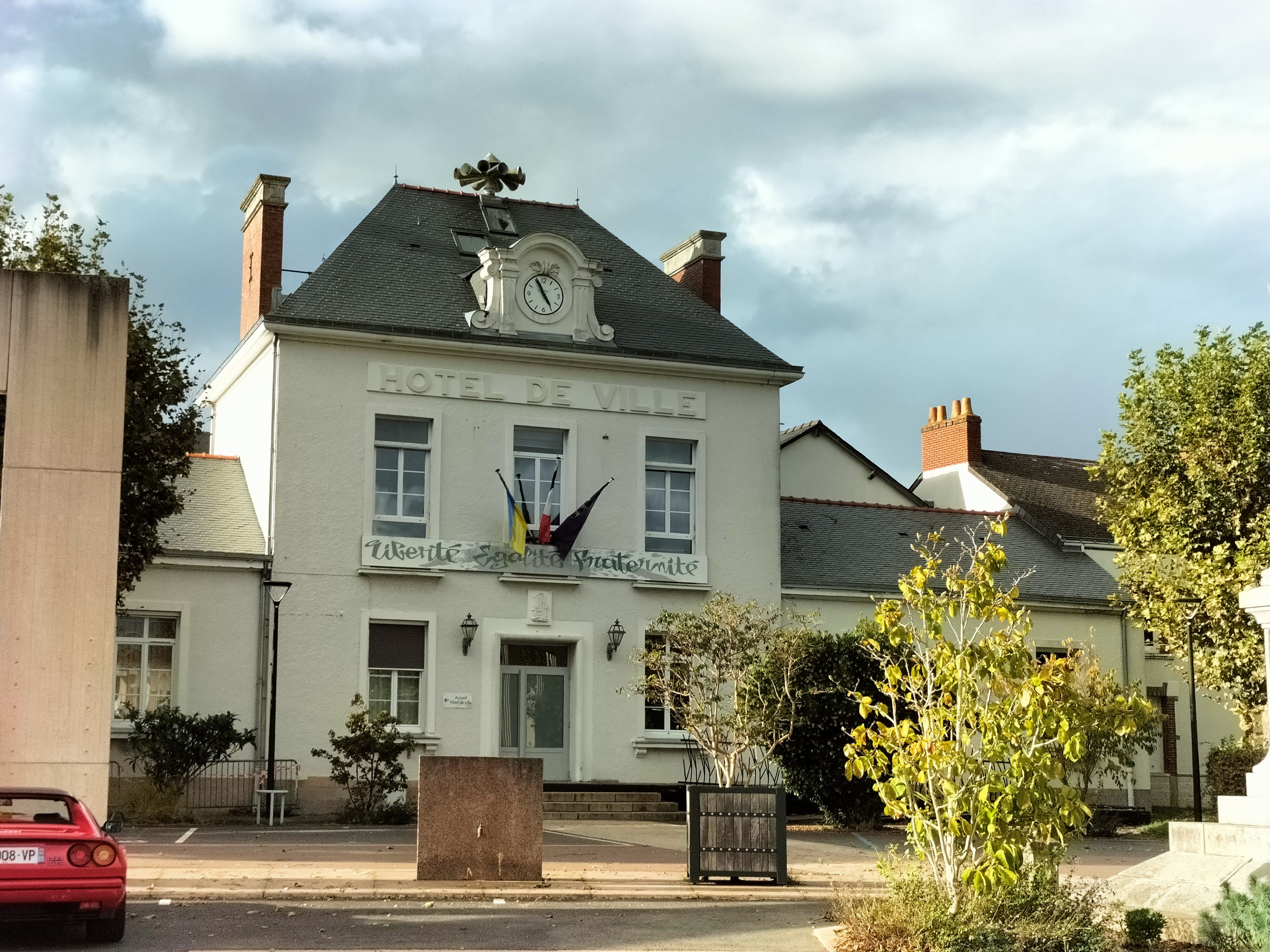
The Hôtel de Ville

Couëron has been suggested as a potential site for Greek trading city of Corbilo, mentioned by Pytheas, Polybius and Strabo. The Hôtel de Ville was completed in 1889.

== Geography ==
=== Physical geography ===
Location of Couëron in the département of Loire-Atlantique

Couëron is located 10 miles (16 km) west of Nantes, on the North bank of the French longest river, the Loire.

The town is bordered by the towns of Sautron and Vigneux-de-Bretagne to the north; Saint-Étienne-de-Montluc to the west; Indre to the east; Le Pellerin and Saint-Jean-de-Boiseau to the south.

It is one of the 19 towns of the agglomeration of Nantes, therefore it is part of the Nantes Métropole (8th most populous across France) and the "espace urbain" of Nantes-Saint-Nazaire.

=== Human geography ===
For many years the city was the location of the Usine Pontgibaud-Tréfimétaux, which manufactured non-ferrous metal products.

Couëron's public transportation is provided by the TAN. There are four bus lines:

- line 91
- line 71
- night line J
- line Express' Couëron Ocean - Gare maritime

The city is also accessed by a railway station (only regional journey) and a ferry which crosses the Loire so as to join the Pellerin.

The city is divided into two distinct sectors:

- Couëron downtown
- La Chabossière, a more recent borough that is nearer to Nantes.

== Administration ==
The current mayor of Couëron is Jean-Pierre Fougerat (PS) until 2014. The municipal council has been led by a left-wing coalition since 1995. In 2008, it was re-elected with 100% of the vote since there was no opposition.

Couëron's inhabitants massively vote for left parties in presidential and legislative elections. In the 2012 presidential election, François Hollande (PS) received an astonishing 68.83% of the vote in the second round against then-President, Nicolas Sarkozy (UMP).

Couëron is twinned with the following places:

- (Republic of Ireland) Wexford, Ireland
- Fleurus, Belgium

== Population ==
Historical population

Year	Pop.	±% p.a.
1793	3,834	—
1800	3,273	−2.23%
1806	3,735	+2.23%
1821	4,062	+0.56%
1831	4,053	−0.02%
1841	4,214	+0.39%
1846	4,522	+1.42%
1851	4,338	−0.83%
1856	4,493	+0.70%
1861	4,709	+0.94%
1866	4,508	−0.87%
1872	4,450	−0.22%
1876	4,343	−0.61%
1881	4,841	+2.19%
1886	4,942	+0.41%
1891	5,377	+1.70%
1896	5,947	+2.04%
1901	6,005	+0.19%

Year	Pop.	±% p.a.
1906	5,862	−0.48%
1911	6,055	+0.65%
1921	6,293	+0.39%
1926	8,271	+5.62%
1931	8,627	+0.85%
1936	8,886	+0.59%
1946	9,954	+1.14%
1954	11,092	+1.36%
1962	11,641	+0.61%
1968	12,276	+0.89%
1975	13,273	+1.12%
1982	14,113	+0.88%
1990	16,319	+1.83%
1999	17,808	+0.97%
2007	18,392	+0.40%
2012	19,765	+1.45%
2017	21,372	+1.58%
2023	24,103	+2.02%

Source: EHESS and INSEE (1968-2023)

Couëron is one of the most cosmopolitan towns of Loire-Atlantique. This is mainly due to an important Polish community that immigrated in the early 1930s, and the presence of many people of Spanish ancestry that fled the civil war in Spain.

The population of Couëron is younger than the national average. The proportion of people above 60 years old is lower than in France (19.6% vs. 22.7%).

== Personalities ==
- John Baptist Mary David (1761–1841), Bishop of Bardstown
- Francis II of Brittany (1433–1488), last Duke of Brittany, father of famous Duchess Anna of Brittany
- Thibault Quéré
- Alcide d'Orbigny (1802–1857), French naturalist.
- Prudent-Louis Leray (1820–1879), French painter and lithographer

== See also ==
- Communes of the Loire-Atlantique department
