= Grandchamp-des-Fontaines =

Grandchamp-des-Fontaines Graunchaun (Gallo) Gregamp-ar-Feunteunioù (Breton)
- Commune
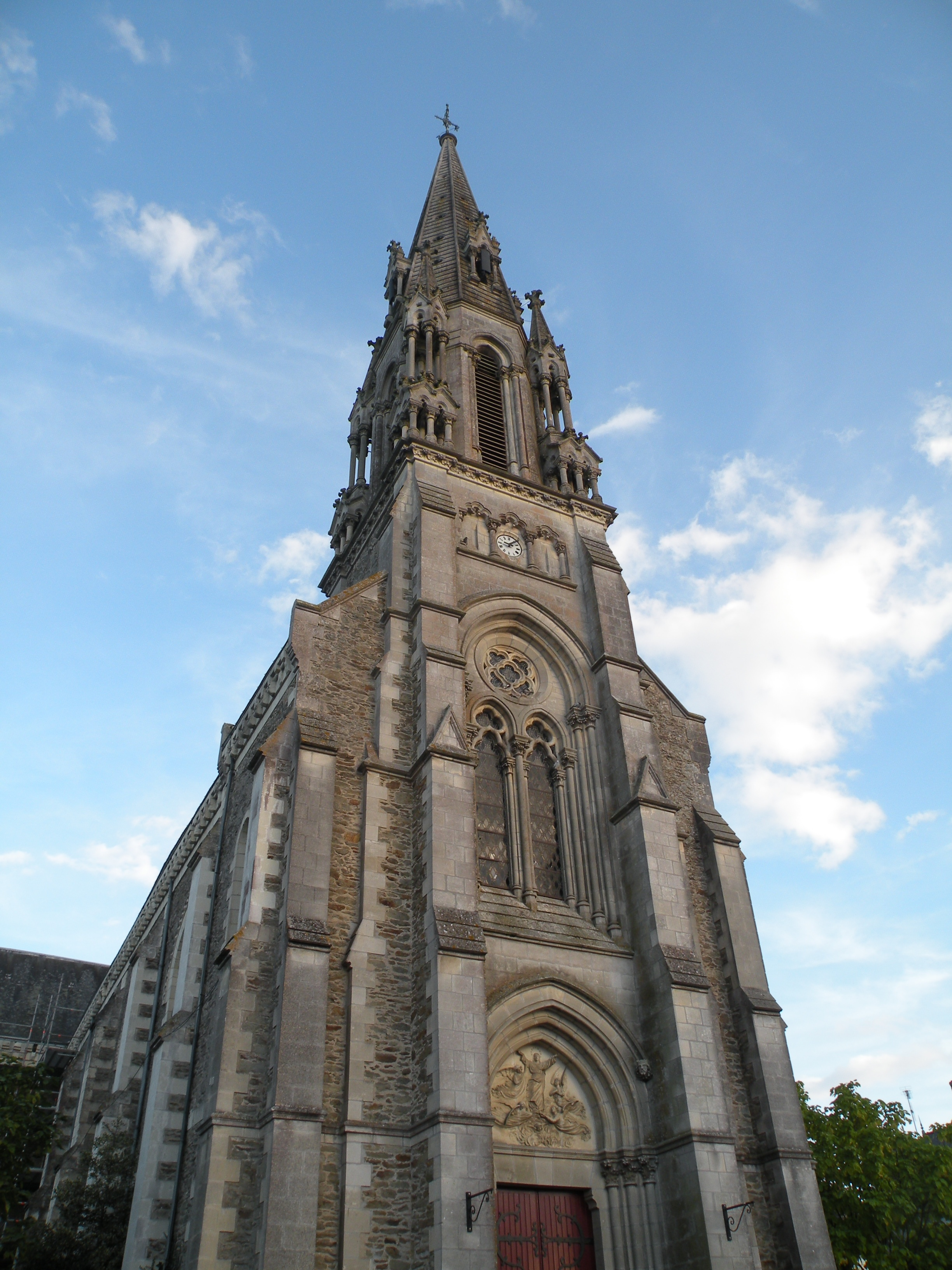

- Coat of arms
- Location of Grandchamp-des-Fontaines
- Location within France Location within Pays de la Loire
- Coordinates: 47°21′57″N 1°36′14″W
- Country: France
- Region: Pays de la Loire
- Department: Loire-Atlantique
- Arrondissement: Châteaubriant-Ancenis
- Canton: La Chapelle-sur-Erdre
- Intercommunality: Erdre et Gesvres

Government
  - Mayor (2020–2026): François Ouvrard
- Area^{1}: 33.87 km^{2} (13.08 sq mi)
- Highest elevation: 70 m (230 ft)
- Lowest elevation: 8 m (26 ft)
- Population (2023): 7,062
  - Density: 208.5/km^{2} (540.0/sq mi)
- Time zone: UTC+01:00 (CET)
  - Summer (DST): UTC+02:00 (CEST)
- INSEE/Postal code: 44066 /44119
- ^{1} French Land Register data, which excludes lakes, ponds, glaciers > 1 km^{2} (0.386 sq mi or 247 acres) and river estuaries.

Grandchamp-des-Fontaines (French pronunciation: [ɡʁɑ̃ʃɑ̃ de fɔ̃tɛn]; before 2023: Grandchamps-des-Fontaines; Gallo: Graunchaun, Breton: Gregamp-ar-Feunteunioù) is a commune in the Loire-Atlantique department in western France.

== Population ==
Historical population

| Year | Pop. | ±% p.a. |
|---|---|---|
| 1793 | 1,370 | — |
| 1800 | 1,304 | −0.70% |
| 1806 | 1,226 | −1.02% |
| 1821 | 1,133 | −0.52% |
| 1831 | 1,446 | +2.47% |
| 1841 | 1,487 | +0.28% |
| 1846 | 1,658 | +2.20% |
| 1851 | 1,845 | +2.16% |
| 1856 | 1,871 | +0.28% |
| 1861 | 1,942 | +0.75% |
| 1866 | 1,987 | +0.46% |
| 1872 | 1,921 | −0.56% |
| 1876 | 1,953 | +0.41% |
| 1881 | 1,895 | −0.60% |
| 1886 | 1,886 | −0.10% |
| 1891 | 1,885 | −0.01% |
| 1896 | 1,769 | −1.26% |
| 1901 | 1,714 | −0.63% |

| Year | Pop. | ±% p.a. |
|---|---|---|
| 1906 | 1,711 | −0.04% |
| 1911 | 1,641 | −0.83% |
| 1921 | 1,459 | −1.17% |
| 1926 | 1,463 | +0.05% |
| 1931 | 1,368 | −1.33% |
| 1936 | 1,390 | +0.32% |
| 1946 | 1,307 | −0.61% |
| 1954 | 1,311 | +0.04% |
| 1962 | 1,281 | −0.29% |
| 1968 | 1,291 | +0.13% |
| 1975 | 1,578 | +2.91% |
| 1982 | 2,223 | +5.02% |
| 1990 | 2,464 | +1.29% |
| 1999 | 3,466 | +3.86% |
| 2007 | 4,334 | +2.83% |
| 2012 | 5,156 | +3.53% |
| 2017 | 6,016 | +3.13% |
| 2023 | 7,062 | +2.71% |

Source: EHESS and INSEE (1968-2023)

== See also ==
- Communes of the Loire-Atlantique department
