= Hôtel de Ville, Couëron =

Town hall in Couëron, France

Hôtel de Ville
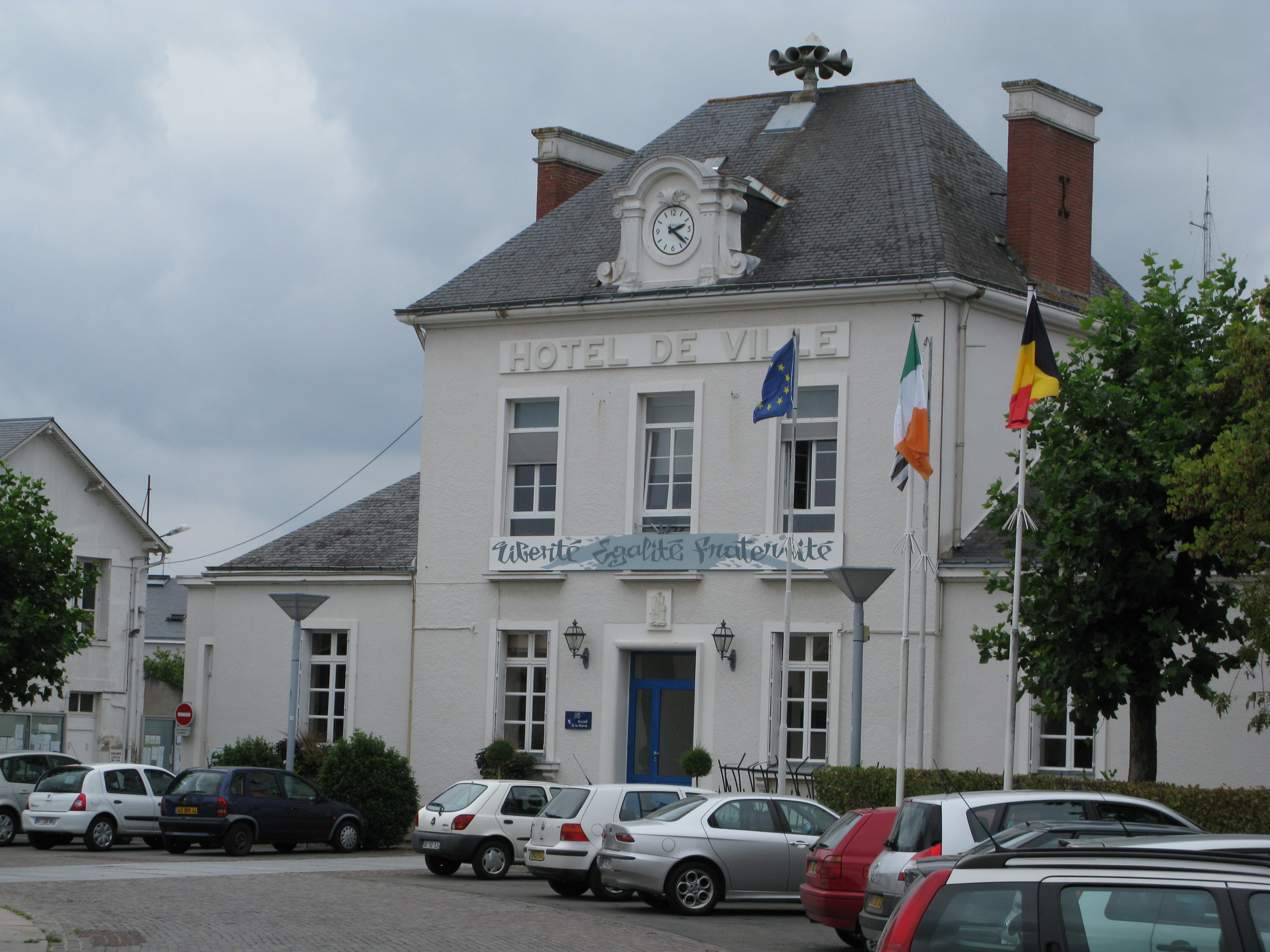
- The main frontage of the Hôtel de Ville in August 2010
- Interactive map of the Hôtel de Ville area

General information
- Type: City hall
- Architectural style: Neoclassical style
- Location: Couëron, France
- Coordinates: 47.2119°N 1.7276°W
- Completed: 1889

The Hôtel de Ville (French pronunciation: [otɛl də vil], City Hall) is a municipal building in Couëron, Loire-Atlantique, in western France, standing on Place Charles-de-Gaulle.

== History ==
Following the French Revolution, the town council initially met at the home of the mayor at the time. In 1881, the Jules Ferry laws were implemented mandating free education for children and the town council decided to commission a combined town hall and school. The site they selected was a large space in the centre of the town known as the Champ de Foire (now Place Charles-de-Gaulle). Construction of the new building commenced in 1886. It was designed in the neoclassical style, built in brick with a cement render finish and was completed in 1889.

The complex was laid out as a two-storey main building with a pair of single-storey wings. The design of the main building involved a symmetrical main frontage of three bays facing onto the Champ de Foire. There were three round headed openings on the ground floor, three casement windows on the first floor, and a clock above the central bay. There were quoins at the corners of the building. Internally, the principal room was the main reception room, later known as the Salle Égalité (equality room). The boys' school was located behind the main building, while the girls' school was erected on the opposite side of the square.

A war memorial, in the form of a granite obelisk surmounted by the bust of an infantryman, was financed by public subscription and installed in the Champ de Foire in front of the town hall on 2 May 1922.

Following the liberation of the town on 12 August 1944 during the Second World War, a large celebration was held in the Champ de Foire to celebrate the surrender of German forces on 8 May 1945. In 1948, the facade of the building was remodelled to create a more contemporary appearance: the round headed openings on the ground floor were replaced with a square headed doorway with a rectangular fanlight flanked by a pair of casement windows in a style like those on the first floor. The quoins were also removed creating a more monochrome finish. In the 1990s, a series of tall concrete arches were installed in a large circle in front of the town hall; a fountain was also installed but, after failing to work, was subsequently removed.
