= Hôtel de Ville, La Chapelle-sur-Erdre =

Town hall in La Chapelle-sur-Erdre, France

Hôtel de Ville
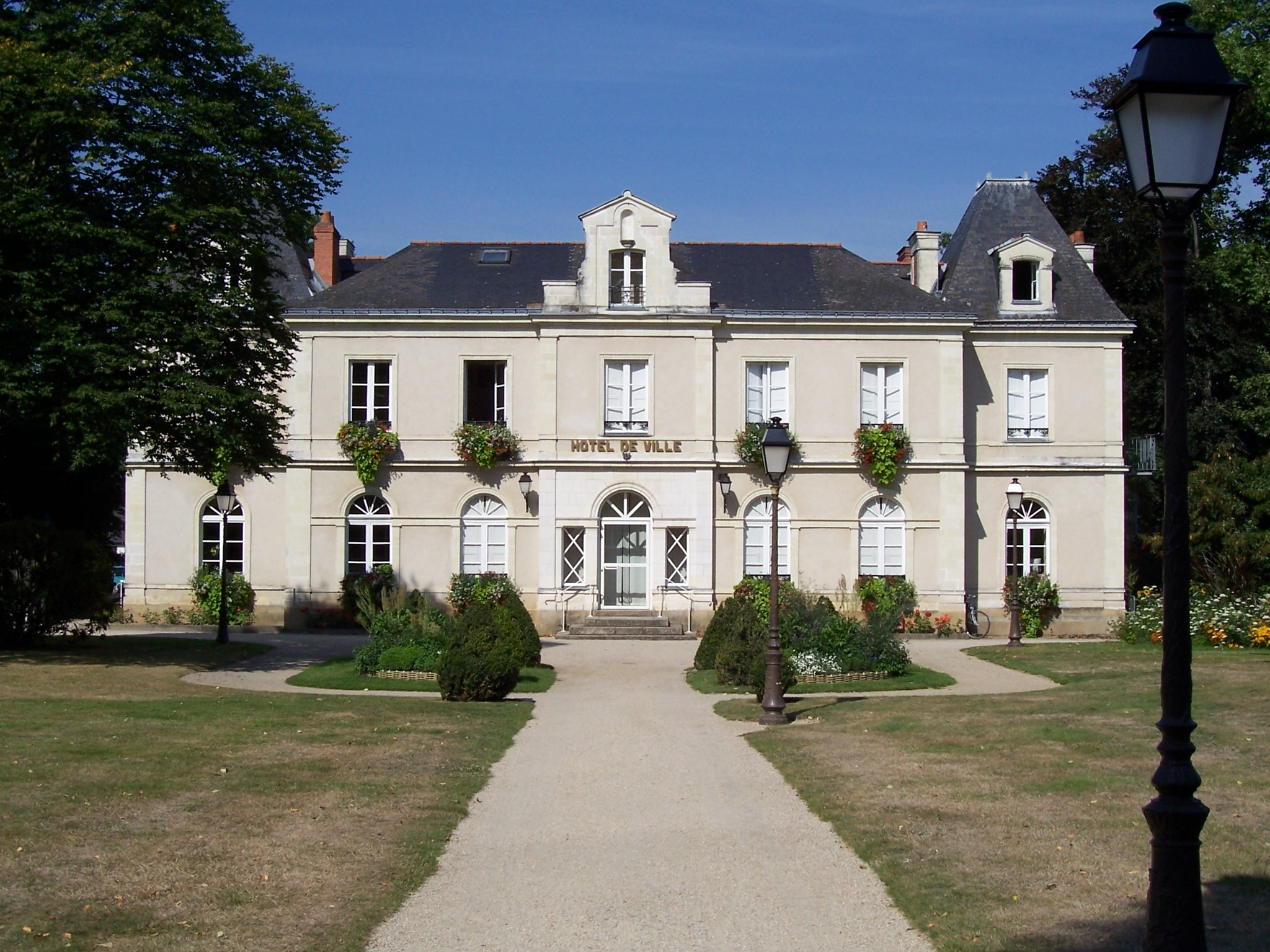
- The main frontage of the Hôtel de Ville in August 2005

General information
- Type: City hall
- Architectural style: Neoclassical style
- Location: La Chapelle-sur-Erdre, France
- Coordinates: 47.2994°N 1.5513°W
- Completed: 1840

The Hôtel de Ville (French pronunciation: [otɛl də vil], City Hall) is a municipal building in La Chapelle-sur-Erdre, Loire-Atlantique, in western France, standing on Rue Olivier-de-Sesmaisons.

== History ==
Following the French Revolution, the new town council initially met in the home of the mayor at the time. This arrangement continued until 1844 when the council led by the mayor, Anselme François Fleury, decided to establish a combined town hall and school. The site they selected was on the north side of what is now Rue François-Clouet.

The building, which was set back from the road, was designed in the neoclassical style and built in ashlar stone. The design involved a symmetrical main frontage of three bays facing onto the street. The central bay, which was rusticated, featured a square-headed doorway with an open pediment on the ground floor, a casement window with a cornice on the first floor, and a pediment above. The outer bays were fenestrated by casement windows with cornices on the ground floor and by casement windows with moulded surrounds on the first floor. There were pilasters at the corners of the building supporting the main pediment, which featured a small semi-circular window in the tympanum. After it was no longer required for municipal use, the building became home to the Centre Communal d'Action Sociale (CCAS).

In 1977, following significant population growth, the council led by the mayor, Donatien de Sesmaisons, decided to acquire a more substantial municipal building. The property they selected was the Château de la Gilière, which was set in a substantial parkland. The château had been commissioned as a private residence by a medical doctor, Adolphe Ollivery. It was designed in the neoclassical style, built in brick with a cement render finish and completed in 1840.

The design involved a symmetrical main frontage of seven bays, with the end bays slightly recessed and surmounted by Châteauesque-style roofs. The central bay featured a Venetian-style doorway on the ground floor, a casement window on the first floor, and a segmental-headed window with a pediment at attic level. The other bays were fenestrated by round-headed windows with moulded surrounds on the ground floor and by square-headed windows with moulded surrounds on the first floor.

The house was subsequently acquired by Say family in 1858, bought by the La Tocnaye family in 1865, sold to the Lamisse family in 1868, and then acquired by the Patard de la Vieuville family in 1900. It was later returned to the Ollivery family before finally being acquired by the council. In the late 1970s, a major programme of works was undertaken to convert it for municipal use: the council relocated into the building in June 1980.

A further programme of works was initiated in spring 2021 to restore the building at a total cost of €800,000. The work was undertaken to a design by the firm of Atelier ArP'Architecture & Patrimoine. The first phase, taking approximately eight months, involved the restoration of the west and south facades, while the second phase, lasting approximately 12 months, involved the restoration of the east and north facades as well as the roof.
