= La Chapelle-sur-Erdre =

La Chapelle-sur-Erdre La Chapèll-sur-Èrdr (Gallo) Chapel-Erzh (Breton)
- Commune
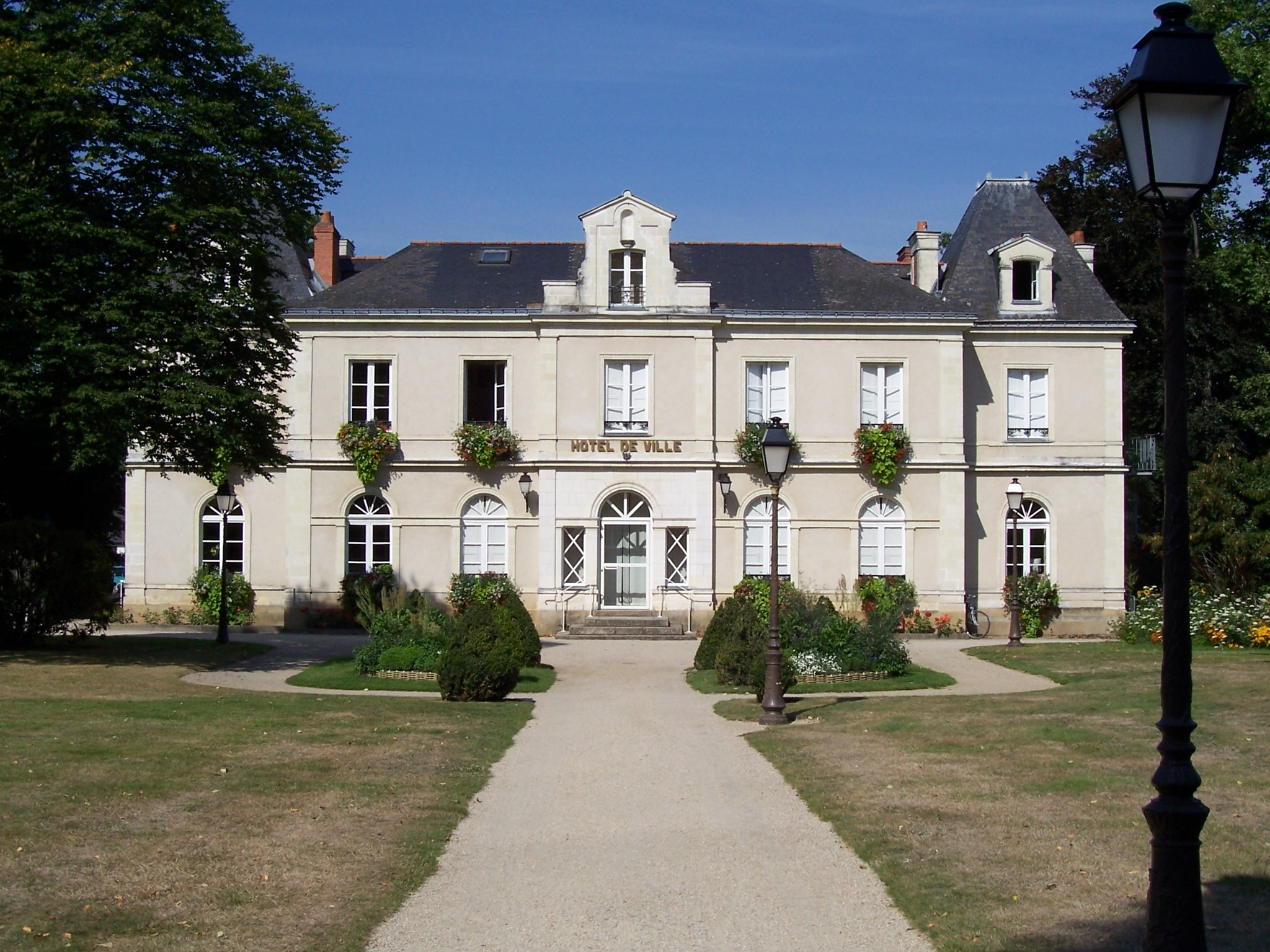
- The Hôtel de Ville

- Coat of arms
- Location of La Chapelle-sur-Erdre
- Location within France Location within Pays de la Loire
- Coordinates: 47°17′59″N 1°33′06″W
- Country: France
- Region: Pays de la Loire
- Department: Loire-Atlantique
- Arrondissement: Nantes
- Canton: La Chapelle-sur-Erdre
- Intercommunality: Nantes Métropole

Government
  - Mayor (2024–2026): Laurent Godet
- Area^{1}: 33.42 km^{2} (12.90 sq mi)
- Highest elevation: 57 m (187 ft)
- Lowest elevation: 1 m (3.3 ft)
- Population (2023): 20,690
  - Density: 619.1/km^{2} (1,603/sq mi)
- Time zone: UTC+01:00 (CET)
  - Summer (DST): UTC+02:00 (CEST)
- INSEE/Postal code: 44035 /44240
- ^{1} French Land Register data, which excludes lakes, ponds, glaciers > 1 km^{2} (0.386 sq mi or 247 acres) and river estuaries.

La Chapelle-sur-Erdre (French pronunciation: [la ʃapɛl syʁ ɛʁdʁ]; Gallo: La Chapèll-sur-Èrdr, Breton: Chapel-Erzh, [ˈʃapːɛlɛrs]) is a commune in the Loire-Atlantique department in western France.

== History ==
The Hôtel de Ville was built as a private residence in 1840.

== Population ==
Historical population

Year	Pop.	±% p.a.
1793	1,398	—
1800	1,097	−3.40%
1806	2,164	+11.99%
1821	2,119	−0.14%
1831	2,267	+0.68%
1841	2,420	+0.66%
1846	2,519	+0.81%
1851	2,554	+0.28%
1856	2,478	−0.60%
1861	2,580	+0.81%
1866	2,614	+0.26%
1872	2,610	−0.03%
1876	2,505	−1.02%
1881	2,593	+0.69%
1886	2,582	−0.08%
1891	2,504	−0.61%
1896	2,502	−0.02%
1901	2,514	+0.10%

Year	Pop.	±% p.a.
1906	2,517	+0.02%
1911	2,514	−0.02%
1921	2,324	−0.78%
1926	2,237	−0.76%
1931	2,117	−1.10%
1936	2,090	−0.26%
1946	2,128	+0.18%
1954	2,322	+1.10%
1962	2,525	+1.05%
1968	2,878	+2.20%
1975	5,858	+10.69%
1982	12,246	+11.11%
1990	14,830	+2.42%
1999	16,391	+1.12%
2007	16,816	+0.32%
2012	17,709	+1.04%
2017	19,609	+2.06%
2023	20,690	+0.90%

Source: EHESS and INSEE (1968-2023)

== See also ==
- Communes of the Loire-Atlantique department
