= Canton of La Chapelle-sur-Erdre =

Coordinates: 47.30°N 1.55°W

The canton of La Chapelle-sur-Erdre is an administrative division of the Loire-Atlantique department, in western France. Its borders were modified at the French canton reorganisation which came into effect in March 2015. Its seat is in La Chapelle-sur-Erdre.

It consists of the following communes:

1. La Chapelle-sur-Erdre
2. Fay-de-Bretagne
3. Grandchamps-des-Fontaines
4. Sucé-sur-Erdre
5. Treillières
6. Vigneux-de-Bretagne
