= Treillières =

- Commune
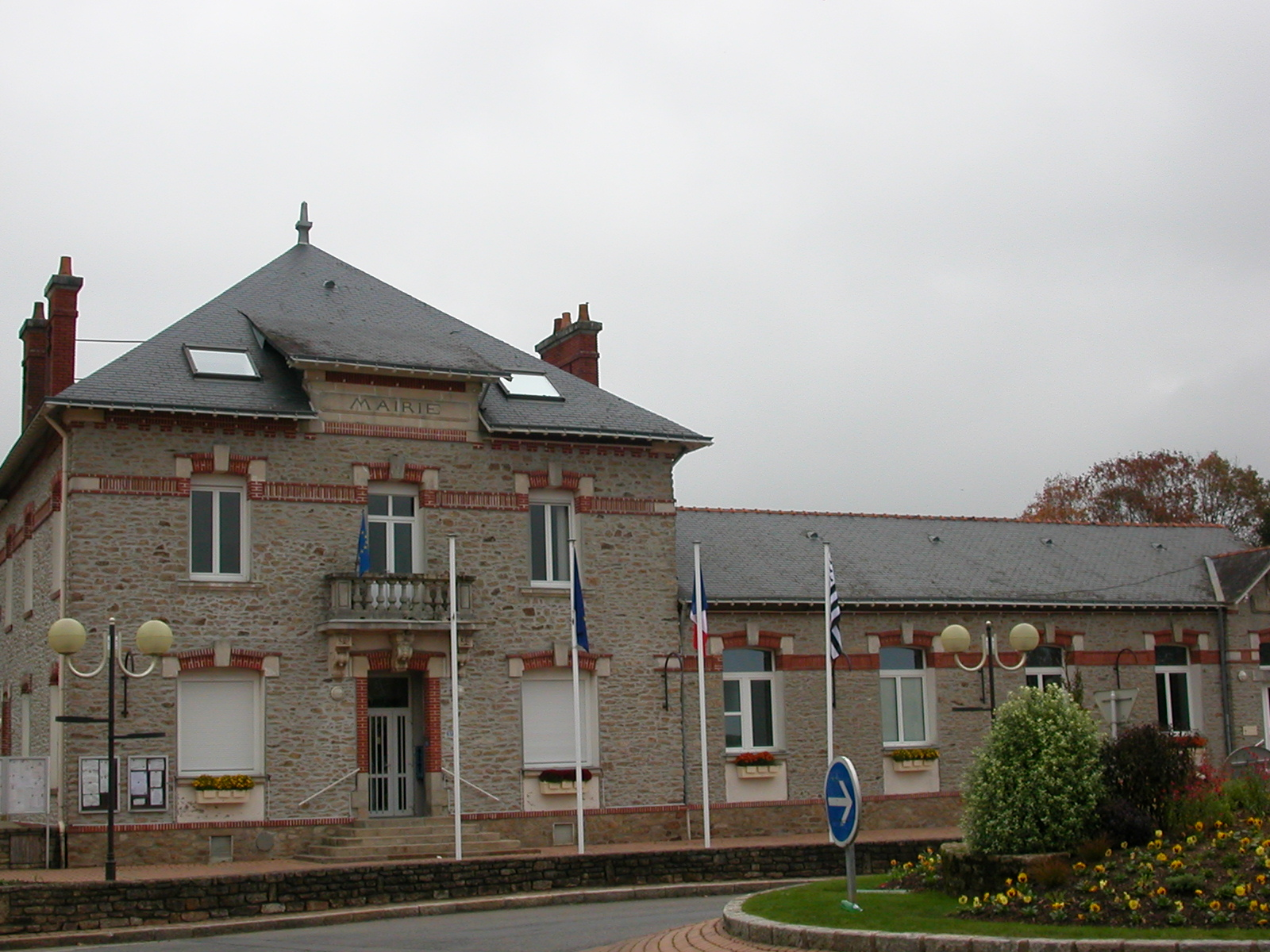
- The town hall in Treillières

- Coat of arms
- Location of Treillières
- Location within France Location within Pays de la Loire
- Coordinates: 47°19′55″N 1°37′32″W
- Country: France
- Region: Pays de la Loire
- Department: Loire-Atlantique
- Arrondissement: Châteaubriant-Ancenis
- Canton: La Chapelle-sur-Erdre
- Intercommunality: Erdre et Gesvres

Government
  - Mayor (2020–2026): Alain Royer
- Area^{1}: 29.05 km^{2} (11.22 sq mi)
- Highest elevation: 74 m (243 ft)
- Lowest elevation: 9 m (30 ft)
- Population (2023): 10,600
  - Density: 365/km^{2} (945/sq mi)
- Demonym(s): Treilliéraines, Treilliérains
- Time zone: UTC+01:00 (CET)
  - Summer (DST): UTC+02:00 (CEST)
- INSEE/Postal code: 44209 /44119
- Website: http://www.treillieres.fr/
- ^{1} French Land Register data, which excludes lakes, ponds, glaciers > 1 km^{2} (0.386 sq mi or 247 acres) and river estuaries.

Treillières (French pronunciation: [tʁɛljɛʁ]; Breton: Trelier) is a commune in the Loire-Atlantique department in western France.

== Population ==
Historical population
| Year | Pop. | ±% p.a. |
|---|---|---|
| 1968 | 1,717 | — |
| 1975 | 2,396 | +4.88% |
| 1982 | 3,569 | +5.86% |
| 1990 | 4,511 | +2.97% |
| 1999 | 6,032 | +3.28% |
| 2007 | 7,432 | +2.64% |
| 2012 | 8,136 | +1.83% |
| 2017 | 9,219 | +2.53% |
| 2023 | 10,600 | +2.35% |
Source: INSEE

== See also ==
- Communes of the Loire-Atlantique department
