= Canton of Saint-Herblain-1 =

Canton of France

Coordinates: 47.21°N 1.65°W

The canton of Saint-Herblain-1 is an administrative division of the Loire-Atlantique department, western France. It was created at the French canton reorganisation which came into effect in March 2015. Its seat is in Saint-Herblain.

It consists of the following communes:

1. Couëron
2. Indre
3. Saint-Herblain (partly)
4. Sautron
