= Fay-de-Bretagne =

Fay-de-Bretagne Faè/Faï (Gallo) Faouell (Breton)
- Commune
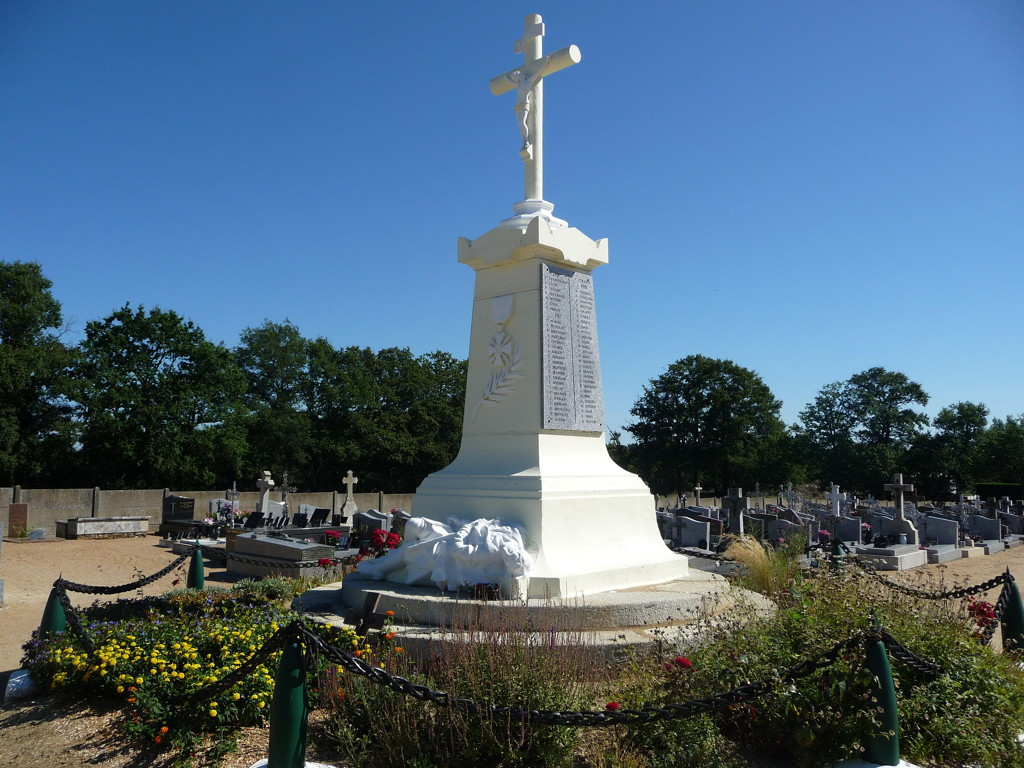
- War memorial

- Coat of arms
- Location of Fay-de-Bretagne
- Location within France Location within Pays de la Loire
- Coordinates: 47°24′56″N 1°47′25″W
- Country: France
- Region: Pays de la Loire
- Department: Loire-Atlantique
- Arrondissement: Châteaubriant-Ancenis
- Canton: La Chapelle-sur-Erdre
- Intercommunality: Erdre et Gesvres

Government
  - Mayor (2020–2026): Claude Labarre
- Area^{1}: 64.81 km^{2} (25.02 sq mi)
- Highest elevation: 87 m (285 ft)
- Lowest elevation: 18 m (59 ft)
- Population (2023): 4,023
  - Density: 62.07/km^{2} (160.8/sq mi)
- Time zone: UTC+01:00 (CET)
  - Summer (DST): UTC+02:00 (CEST)
- INSEE/Postal code: 44056 /44130
- ^{1} French Land Register data, which excludes lakes, ponds, glaciers > 1 km^{2} (0.386 sq mi or 247 acres) and river estuaries.

Fay-de-Bretagne (French pronunciation: [fɛ də bʁətaɲ], literally Fay of Brittany; Gallo: Faè or Faï, Breton: Faouell) is a commune in the Loire-Atlantique department in western France.

== Population ==
Historical population

Year	Pop.	±% p.a.
1793	3,100	—
1821	3,203	+0.12%
1846	4,060	+0.95%
1872	3,669	−0.39%
1901	3,521	−0.14%
1926	2,786	−0.93%
1946	2,249	−1.06%
1962	2,172	−0.22%
1968	2,109	−0.49%

Year	Pop.	±% p.a.
1975	1,947	−1.14%
1982	2,175	+1.59%
1990	2,388	+1.17%
1999	2,489	+0.46%
2007	2,911	+1.98%
2012	3,386	+3.07%
2017	3,618	+1.33%
2023	4,023	+1.78%

Source: EHESS and INSEE (1968-2023)

== See also ==
- Communes of the Loire-Atlantique department
