= Charles-Émile de Tournemine =

French painter (1812–1872)

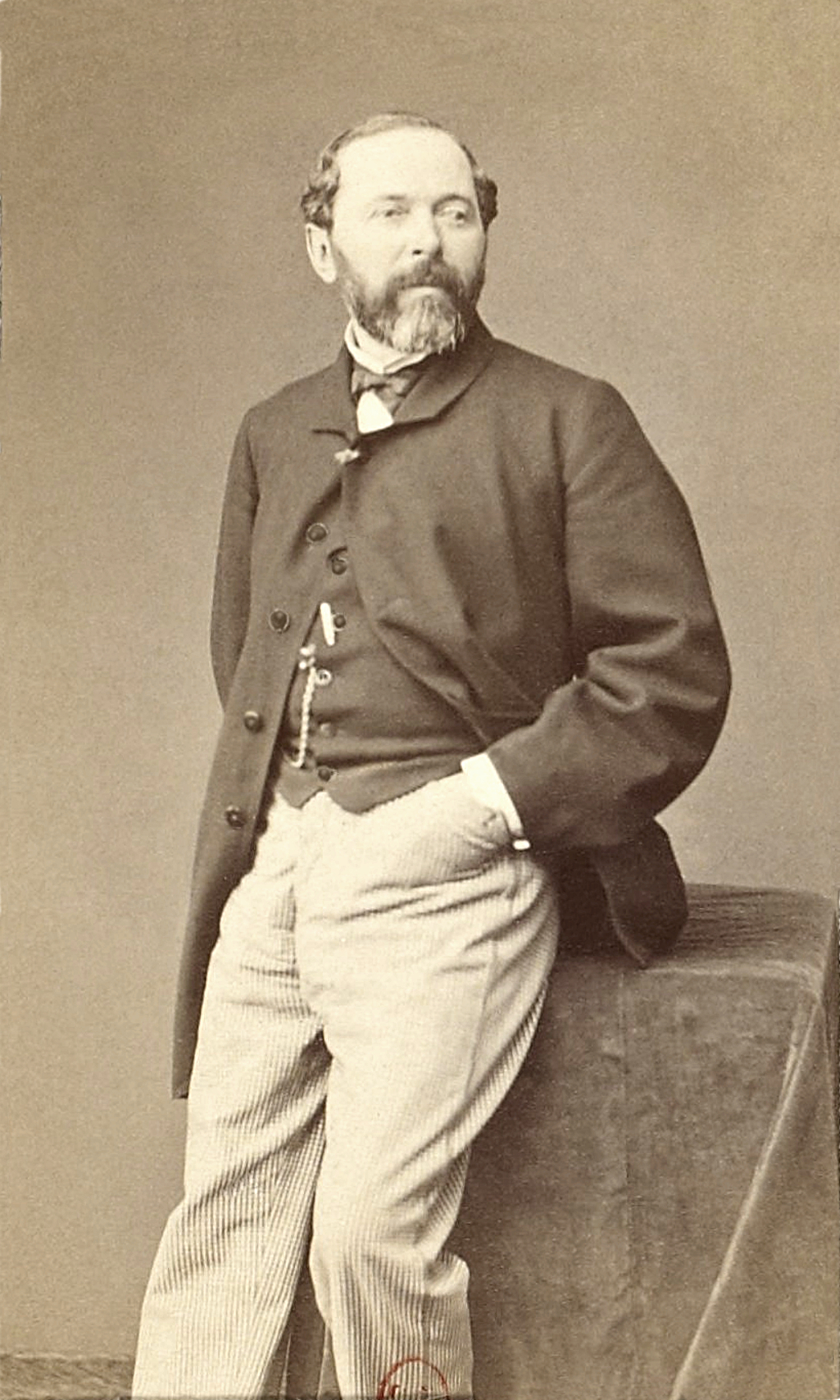
Charles de Tournemine (c.1860)

Charles-Émile Vacher de Tournemine (25 October 1812, Toulon - 22 December 1872, Toulon) was a French painter who specialized in Orientalist scenes.

== Biography ==
His grandfather, Jean-Charles Vacher de Tournemine (1755-1840), was an archaeologist. His father, Bernard Vacher de Tournemine (1788-1861), was an army officer who was not married to Charles' mother, Marie Anne Victoire Roubaud (1783-1852). Although he never married her, he always took an interest in Charles and helped support his career.

In 1825, he entered the École des Mousses, a secondary school operated by the French Navy, and served as a cabin boy on the schooner, L’Amaranthe. He sailed throughout the Eastern Mediterranean and was wounded in his left eye at the Battle of Navarino. In 1831, he quit the Navy and enlisted in the 11th Artillery Regiment, where his father was a Colonel. Having shown some artistic inclinations since he was very young, he became a designer at the Ministry of War in 1840.

While in Paris, he lived with an aunt and began paying visits to the workshop of the painter, Eugène Isabey; becoming acquainted with several notable figures in the art world. In 1843 and 1844, he made painting trips to Normandy, Picardy, Brittany, and the Loire region. After his aunt's death in 1845, he inherited her estate and married Marie-Émilie-Clarisse Chauvin (1824-1891). At this time, he also began buying art and would amass a substantial collection.

From 1846 to 1853, he and his friend, the painter François-Louis Français, published an annual collection of lithographs: Les artistes contemporains. The year 1846 also saw his first exhibit at the Salon. In 1852, he became a curator at the Musée du Luxembourg. That same year, his mother died, and he was taken with the desire to travel. The following year, he sold a significant part of his collection to finance an extended visit to the places he had seen while in the Navy, as well as the coastal areas of North Africa. This inspired him to become an Orientalist painter. In 1855, he presented his first works in that genre at the Exposition Universelle. After 1857, he gave up painting local landscapes entirely. Further trips to the Middle East ensued; some sponsored by the government.

In 1869, he was part of the entourage accompanying the Empress Eugénie on her visit to Egypt for the opening of the Suez Canal. The following year, he was placed in charge of safeguarding the collections of the Musée du Luxembourg during the Siege of Paris.

After the events of the "Bloody Week" of the Paris Commune, he quit his position as curator and returned to Toulon, where he died in 1872. He was interred in Paris at the Cimetière de Montmartre.

== Selected paintings ==
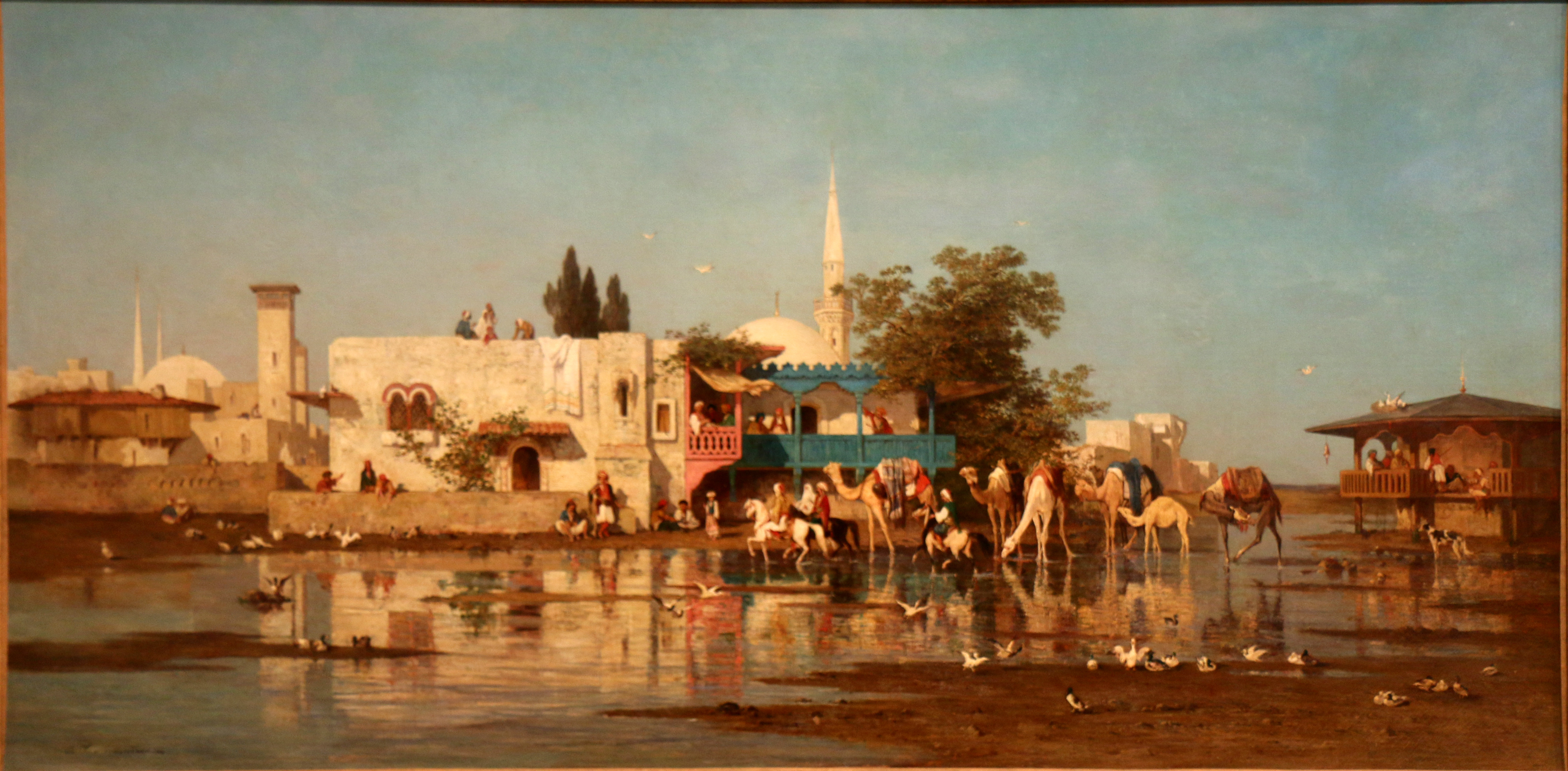
Street Leading to the Bazaar at Chabran-el-Kébir

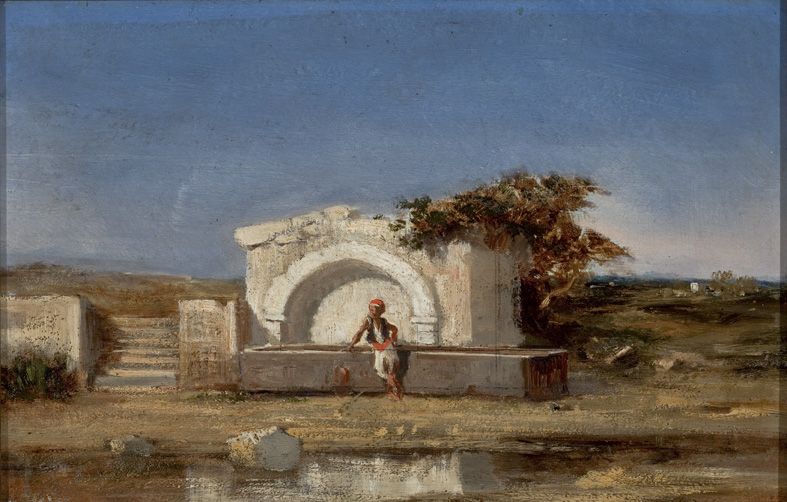
Landscape with a Fountain

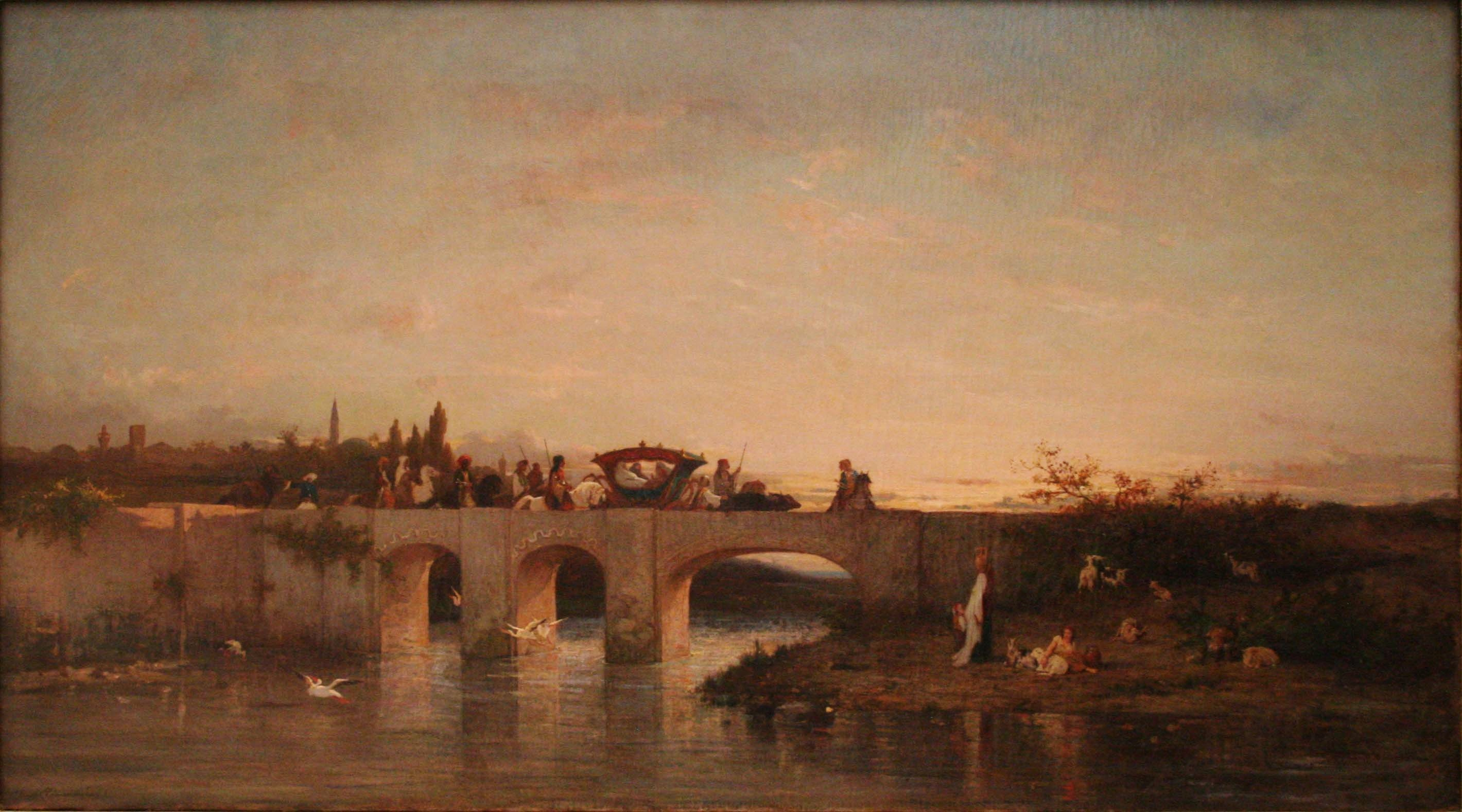
Turkish Noblewomen, Out for a Ride

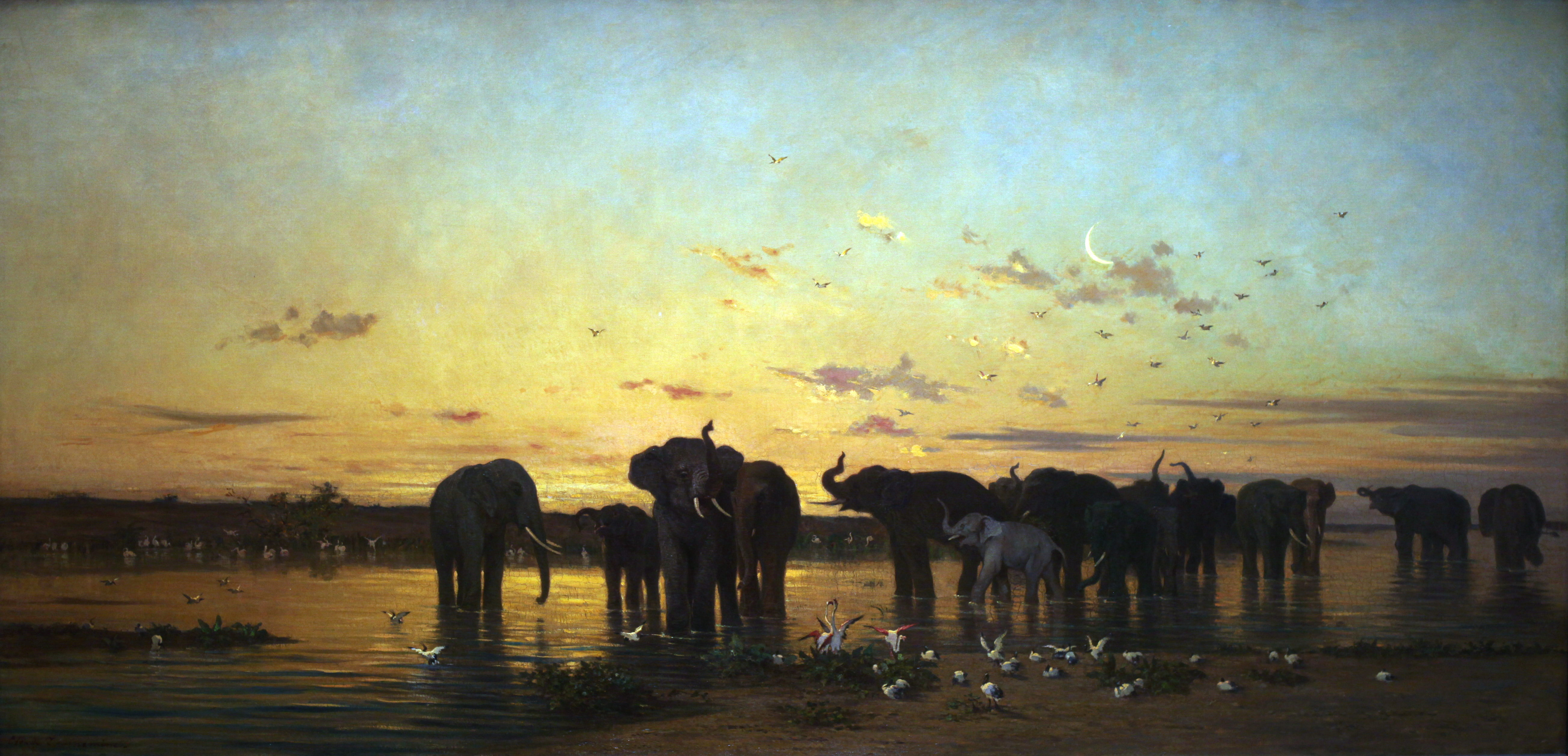
African Elephants
