= Prudent-Louis Leray =

19th-century French painter

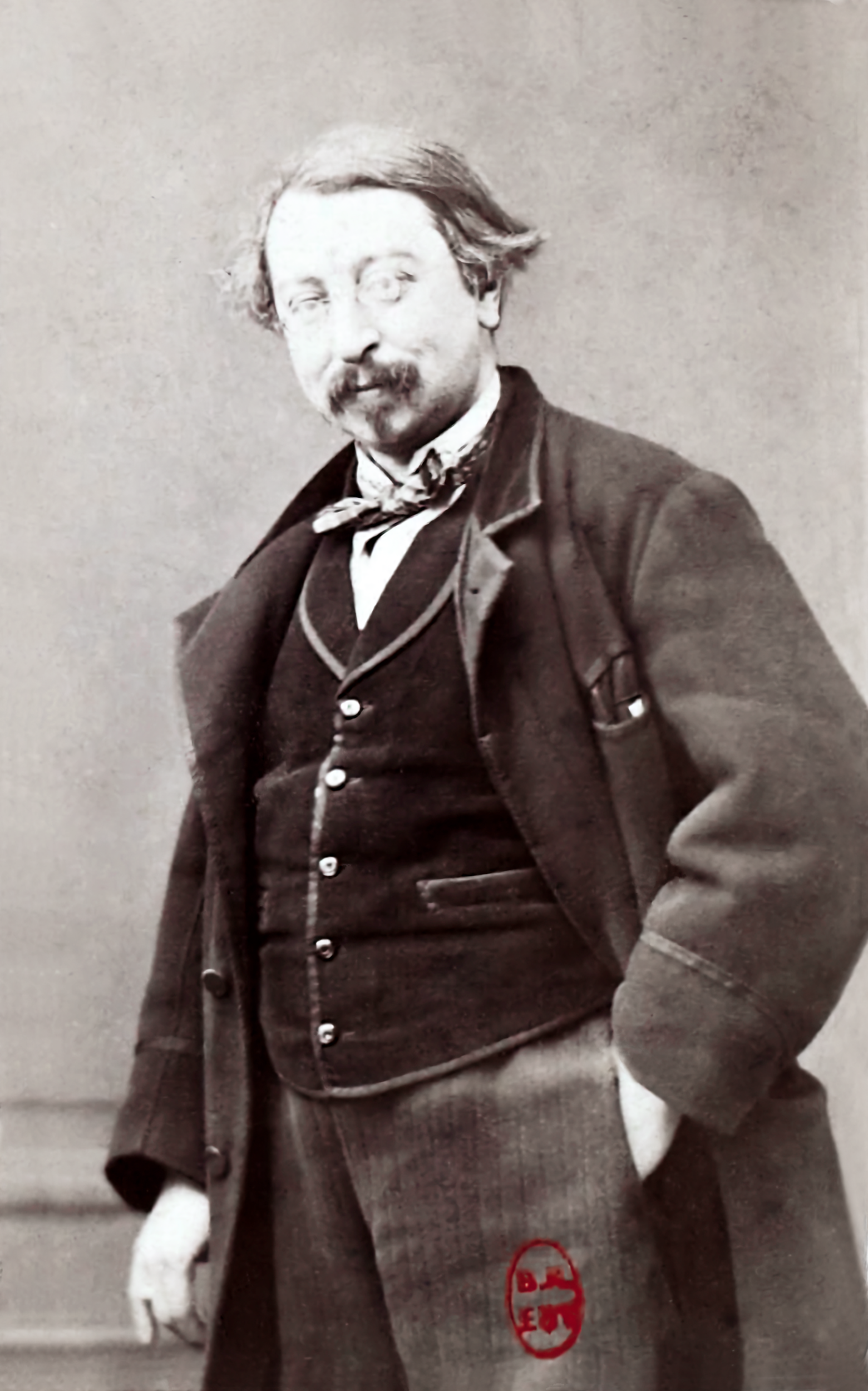
Image of Prudent Leray

Prudent-Louis Leray, (29 August 1820 – 25 May 1879) was a French painter and lithographer.

== Life ==
Born in Couëron, Leray was the son of a famous doctor from Nantes who distinguished himself during the 1832 cholera pandemic. After studying as a scholarship student at the college in Nantes, Leray entered the city school of fine arts.

A pupil of Paul Delaroche, Leray exhibited for the first time at the Salon of 1848. He excelled at genre paintings.

Leray died as a result of a stroke he had suffered four days earlier, while painting in his workshop on Rue Véron. He was 58 years old.
