= Marie Battu =

French soprano

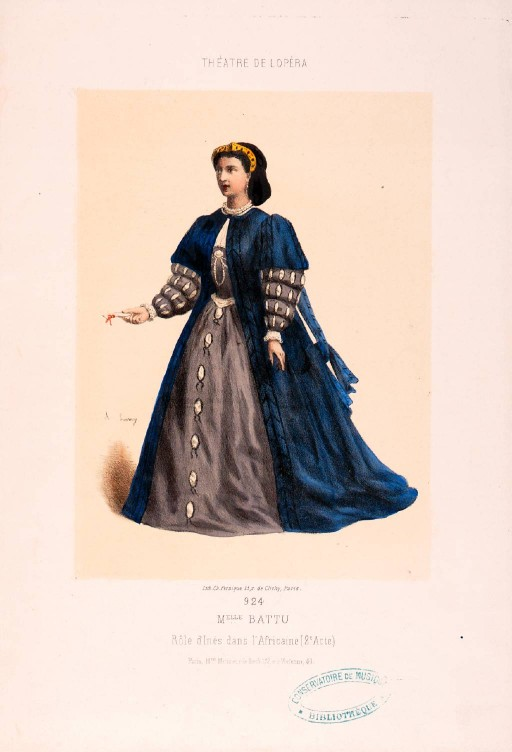
Marie Battu as Inès in L'Africaine, 1865

Marie Battu (30 May 1838 – 12 June 1919) was a French soprano. She created the role of Inès in Meyerbeer's French grand opera L'Africaine.

== Training and career ==
Marie Battu was the daughter of Pantaléon Battu (1799–1870), violinist, composer and assistant conductor at the Paris Opera, and sister of Léon Battu, author of many operatic libretti and theatrical entertainments.

She studied singing with Gilbert Duprez and made her debut at the Théâtre des Italiens in Paris in 1860, as Amina in Vincenzo Bellini's La sonnambula. She appeared in operas in London, Paris and Baden-Baden, in works by Verdi, Donizetti, Rossini and Meyerbeer.

Marie Battu married Dominique Lablache, son of star operatic bass Luigi Lablache.

She also gave many concerts in numerous European cities. Having made her debut in December 1864 at the Paris Opéra in a revival of Rossini's Mosè in Egitto, the following year Marie Battu created the role of Inès in Meyerbeer's last and posthumous opera L'Africaine at the same house. She later appeared at the Opéra as Mathilde in Guillaume Tell, the Queen in Les Huguenots, and Zerline in Don Giovanni. She appeared once at the Opéra-Comique, as the countess in The Marriage of Figaro in February 1872, and retired from the stage the year after.

She lived her final years in Paris where she died in 1919.
