= Vigneux-de-Bretagne =

Vigneux-de-Bretagne Gwinieg-Breizh (Breton)
- Commune
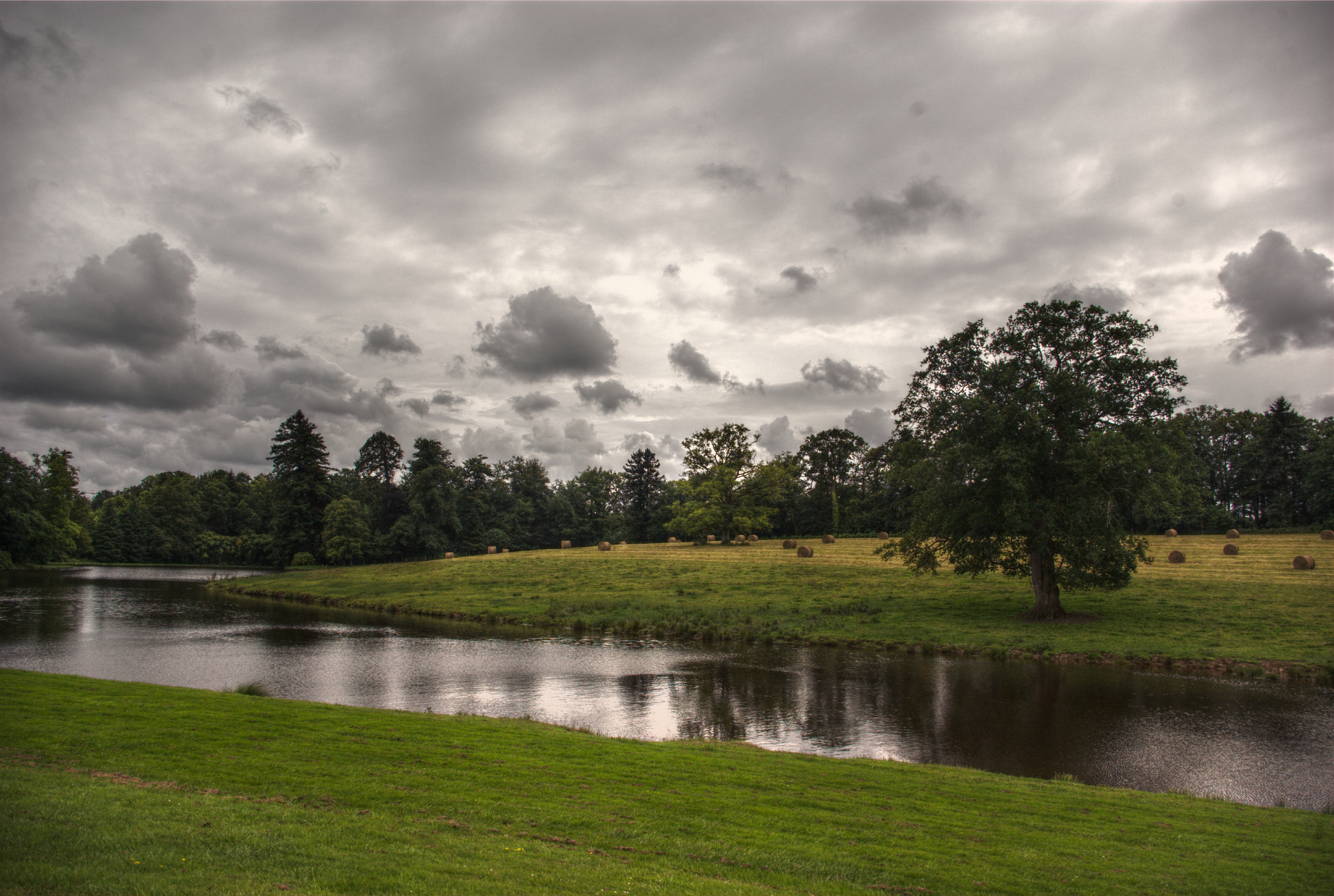
- The park of the château de la Bretonnière, in Vigneux-de-Bretagne
- Location of Vigneux-de-Bretagne
- Location within France Location within Pays de la Loire
- Coordinates: 47°19′37″N 1°44′14″W
- Country: France
- Region: Pays de la Loire
- Department: Loire-Atlantique
- Arrondissement: Châteaubriant-Ancenis
- Canton: La Chapelle-sur-Erdre
- Intercommunality: Erdre et Gesvres

Government
  - Mayor (2021–2026): Gwënola Franco
- Area^{1}: 54.68 km^{2} (21.11 sq mi)
- Highest elevation: 92 m (302 ft)
- Lowest elevation: 24 m (79 ft)
- Population (2023): 6,692
  - Density: 122.4/km^{2} (317.0/sq mi)
- Demonym(s): Vignolais, Vignolaises
- Time zone: UTC+01:00 (CET)
  - Summer (DST): UTC+02:00 (CEST)
- INSEE/Postal code: 44217 /44360
- Website: www.vigneuxdebretagne.fr
- ^{1} French Land Register data, which excludes lakes, ponds, glaciers > 1 km^{2} (0.386 sq mi or 247 acres) and river estuaries.

Vigneux-de-Bretagne (Breton: Gwinieg-Breizh) is a commune in the Loire-Atlantique department in western France.

== Population ==
Historical population
Year	Pop.	±% p.a.
1968	1,926	—
1975	2,274	+2.40%
1982	3,183	+4.92%
1990	4,026	+2.98%
1999	4,712	+1.76%
2007	5,260	+1.38%
2012	5,572	+1.16%
2017	6,030	+1.59%
2023	6,692	+1.75%
Source: INSEE

== See also ==
- Communes of the Loire-Atlantique department
