= Turn-based MMORPG =

A turn-based MMORPG is a type of massively multiplayer online role-playing game that utilizes turn-based game flow, meaning that game actions are partitioned into well-defined and visible parts, called turns. A player of a turn-based game is allowed a period of analysis before committing to a game action, ensuring a separation between the game flow and the thinking process. Many turn-based MMORPGs are text-based, but there are a few games which depict their environments with fully animated graphics, such as Atlantica Online.

== Text-based and browser games ==
Many multiplayer browser games give the player a set number of turns which are replenished at set increments of time or through in-game items. Early BBS door games were turn-based, and browser games that use server-side scripting (such as PHP, ASP, Ruby, Perl, Python or Java) operate on similar principles. Most of these games use text or a combination of text and still images to depict the game world.

Games like Kingdom of Loathing play like traditional turn-based role-playing video games, with players given a new allotment of turns each day.

== Graphical games ==
Relatively few fully animated, graphical multiplayer RPGs include turn-based gameplay.

- Dofus, Dofus Arena and Wakfu are turn-based tactical role-playing games developed by Ankama Games. They feature isometric, sprite-based graphics.
- Atlantica Online is a strategic, turn-based MMORPG launched in 2008. While the game's battles are turn-based, during each turn the player must issue commands to their characters within a time limit of 30 seconds, making combat fast-paced.
- Darkwind: War on Wheels is a 3D turn-based car combat MMORPG which, similar to Atlantica Online, provides 30-second periods in which players issue commands to their vehicles. Game turns represent one-second of simulated time, and cars are moved using physics calculations.
- Concerto Gate uses a combat system that combines turn-based and real time, similar to Final Fantasy's "Active Time Battle" system.
- Wonderland Online is a 2D MMORPG by IGG Inc..
- Digimon Battle. Even though Digimon Battle was originally released in South Korea nearly 10 years ago, WeMade decided to launch the game in North America in March 2010.
- Wizard101 and Pirate101 are 3D turn-based MMORPGs with card-based and board game-based gameplay respectively, developed by KingsIsle Entertainment.
- Toontown Online is a 3D turn based game inspired by the cartoon world of Disney; while the official game has shut down, multiple fan-made servers have taken its place.

== See also ==
- Massively multiplayer online game
- Role-playing video game
- Turns, rounds and time-keeping systems in games (Real-time vs. turn-based gameplay)
