= La Presse de la Manche =

French newspaper

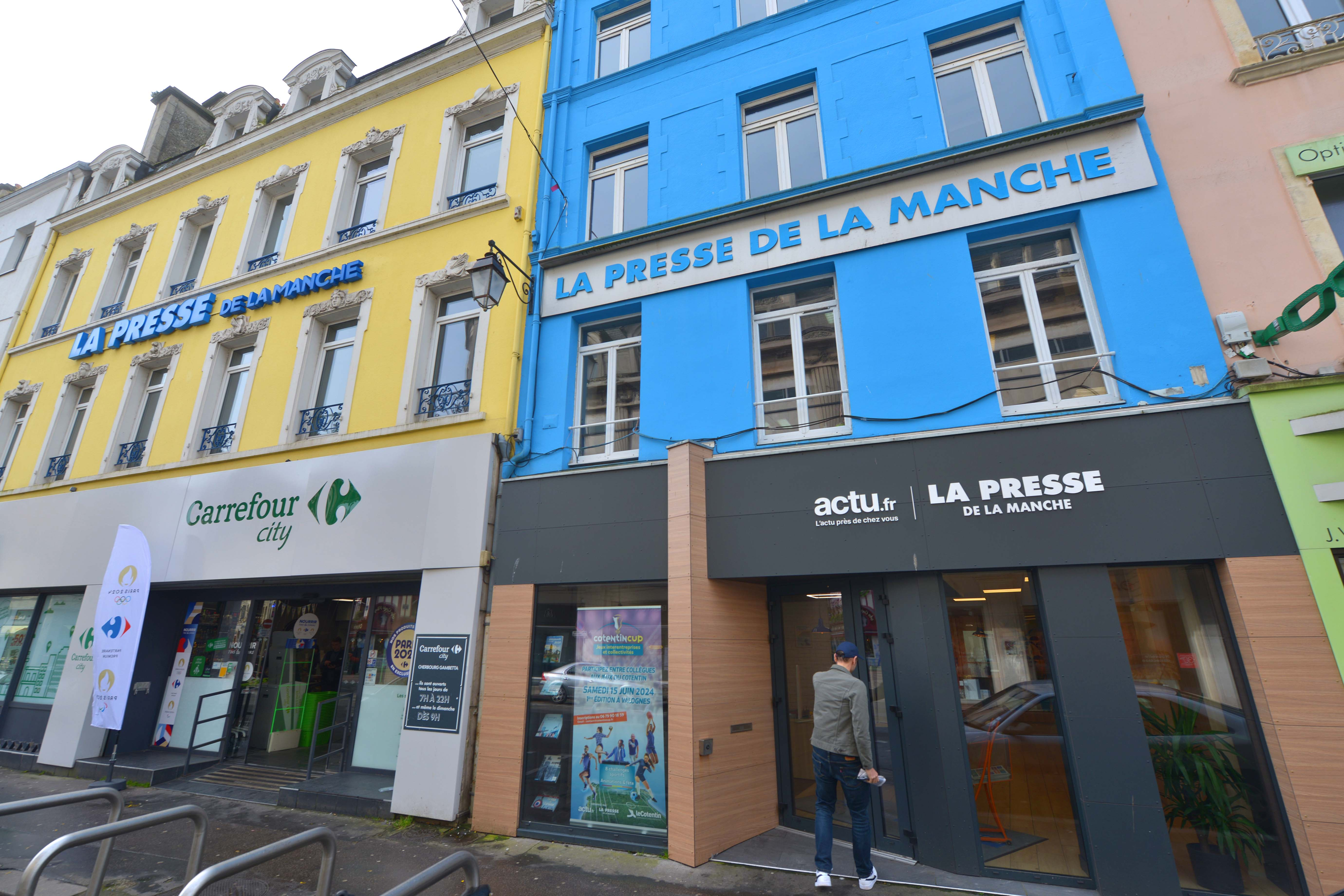
- Head office at 9, rue Gambetta, Cherbourg-Octeville
- Format: Tabloid (from 2018)
- Owner: Publihebdos
- Editor-in-chief: Francis Gaunand
- Founded: October 5, 1953
- Language: French
- City: Cherbourg-en-Cotentin
- Country: France
- Website: actu.fr/la-presse-de-la-manche/

La Presse de la Manche (French pronunciation: [la pʁɛs də la mɑ̃ʃ]; sometimes referred to as La Presse) is a French departmental daily newspaper based in Cherbourg-en-Cotentin (Manche).

== History ==
=== 1889–1953: From Le Réveil cherbourgeois to La Presse cherbourgeoise ===
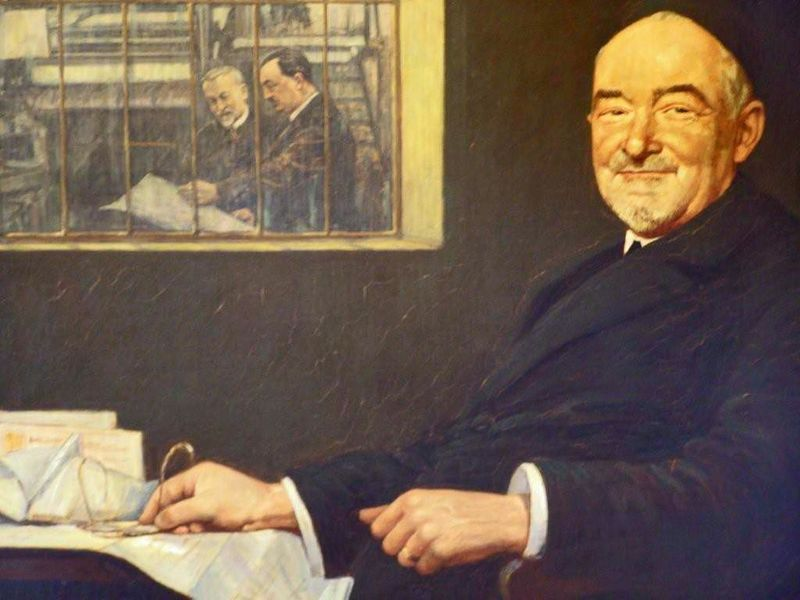
Jean-Baptiste Biard by Michel Adrien Servant. Date unknown.

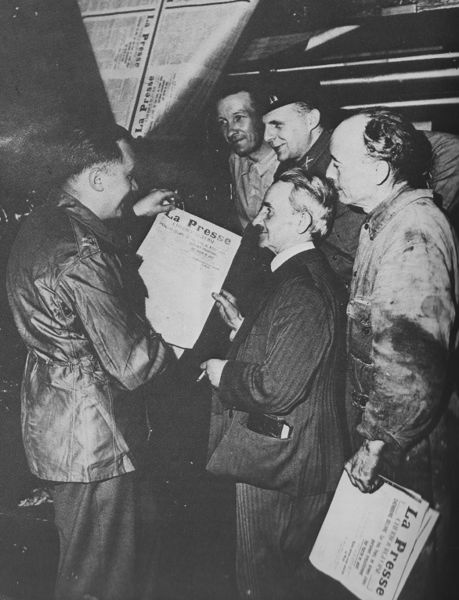
First issue of La Presse cherbourgeoise. Daniel Yon (center, in costume) presents the newspaper to General de Gaulle's information lieutenant (left).

In 1889, Jean-Baptiste Biard launched the bi-weekly Le Réveil (with a circulation of 4,500 copies), covering news from Cherbourg and Cotentin.

In 1905, Cherbourg-Éclair succeeded Le Réveil. The daily was condemned after the Liberation.

As the first daily to be published in liberated France, it bore the subtitle Premier quotidien à paraître en France libérée and was named La Presse cherbourgeoise. Founded on July 3, 1944, its leadership was entrusted to Daniel Yon, who was approved by the Resistance. He was assisted by Maurice Hamel.

While fighting continued in the department, the first front page of the newspaper announced Le Cotentin libéré (Cotentin liberated), and the first editorial, signed by Daniel Yon, thanked "those who, for four years, pursued the tireless effort to liberate the territory." The paper positioned itself as "republican and secular."

The newspaper was later returned to Jeanne Biard (daughter of André Biard), who in 1947 entrusted the daily's leadership to her husband, Marc Giustiniani, a prisoner of war from 1940 to 1945.

=== 1953–1990: A daily owned by the Giustiniani family ===
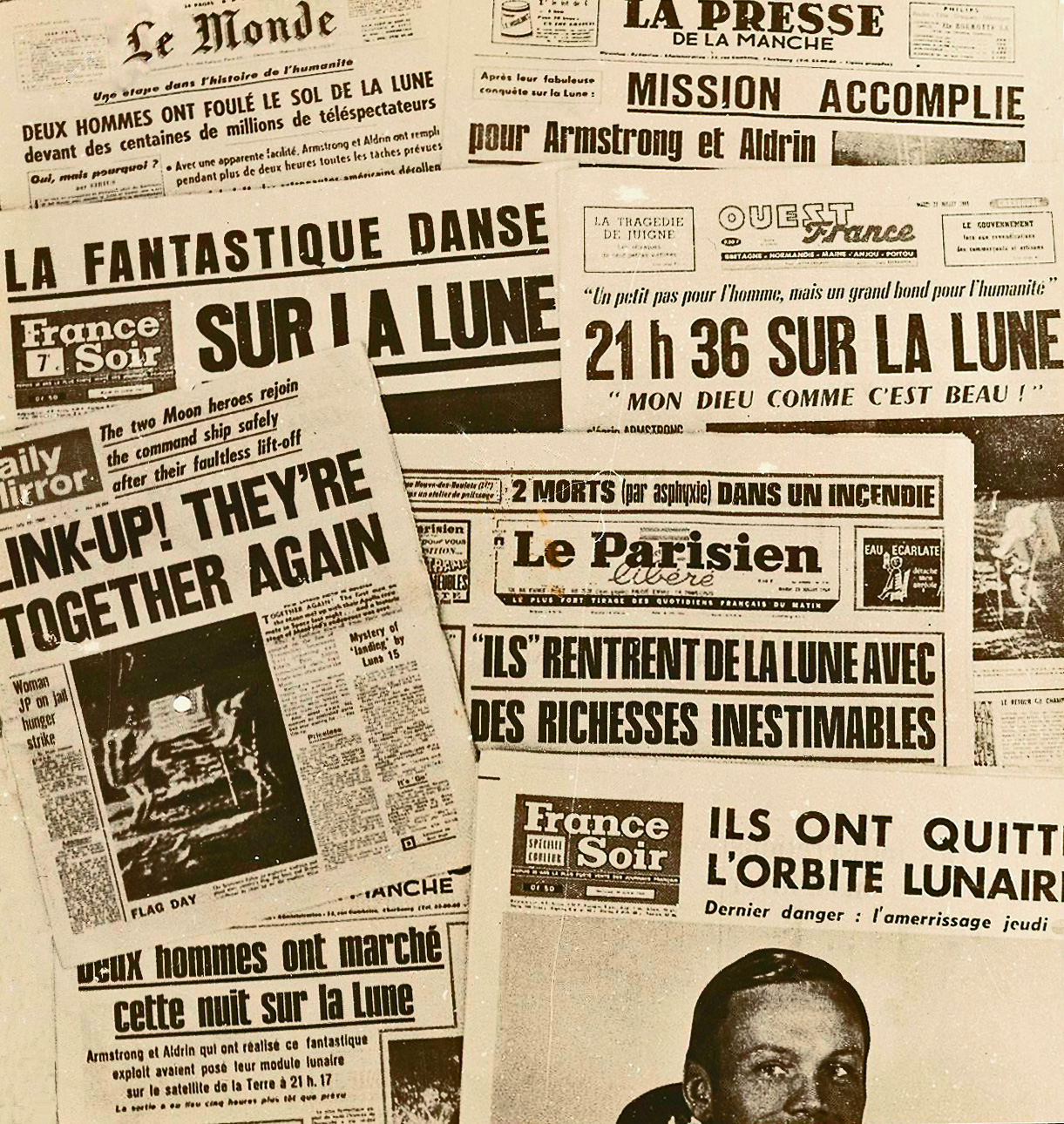
Several front pages, including La Presse de la Manche and Ouest-France.

La Presse de la Manche was first published under this title on October 5, 1953. It added a Sunday edition in October 1987.

The paper was long managed by Marc Giustiniani, who modernized it. "Cited as an example due to its steady increase in circulation, La Presse de la Manche is also noted for its scoops, the relevance of its investigations, the loyalty of its correspondents, and the authority of its editorials." After his death, his wife, Jeanne Biard, took over.

Between 1960 and 1982, the daily's steadily increasing circulation was as follows:

Date	September 1960	September 1969	September 1970	September 1971	September 1972	September 1982
Printing	20,784	21,621	22,280	23,365	23,859	26,395

During this period, La Presse de la Manche became a "pocket of resistance" against Ouest-France and Paris-Normandie (owned by Philippe Hersant). While Ouest-France was widely distributed in Brittany and Lower Normandy, the regional daily faced competition from La Presse in Cotentin. Paris-Normandie's distribution was also limited to the Caen and Lisieux districts (in Calvados). According to academic Michel Mathien, this situation was due to the geographical isolation of Cotentin, which allowed Cherbourg to have its newspaper.

=== From 1990: Acquisition by Ouest-France ===
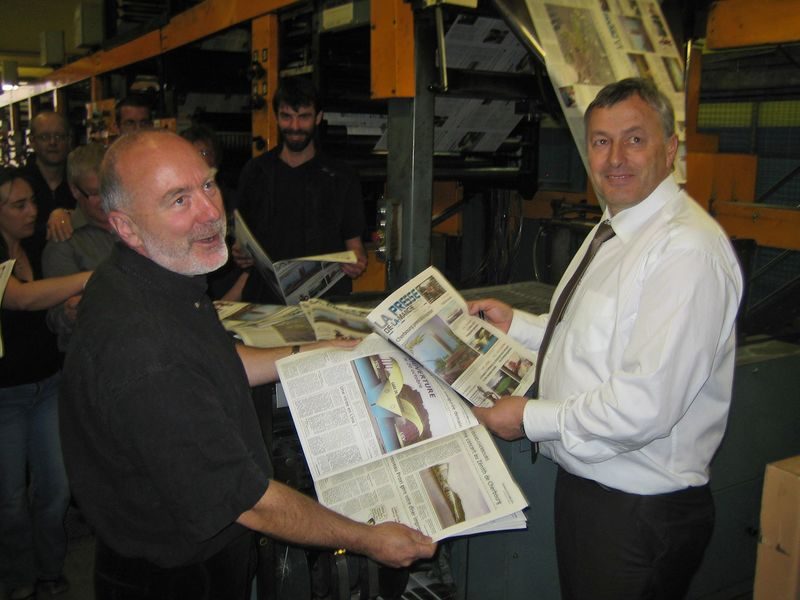
April 23, 2010: 20,000th issue presented by Philippe Le Barillier, deputy editor-in-chief (left) and Marcel Clairet, CEO.

In February 1990, the Groupe Sipa - Ouest-France acquired its competitor La Presse de la Manche for 80 million francs (while its valuation was 35 million francs), according to Le Monde. The Havas and Hersant groups were also interested. In 1998, 25,000 copies were sold daily.

Between 2010 and 2012, the newspaper launched its website and ventured into social media.

In 2016, the Cherbourg daily continued its digital transformation and was integrated into Publihebdos, joining the national information platform Actu.fr.

In 2018, the newspaper adopted a tabloid format. The free weekly information paper C'est à Cherbourg replaced Publi7 that same year.

In 2019, the newspaper celebrated its 130th anniversary, publishing a special edition to mark the occasion.

== Revelations ==
Based in Cherbourg, the newspaper's revelations often focus on the shipyards.

=== The Cherbourg Boats Affair ===
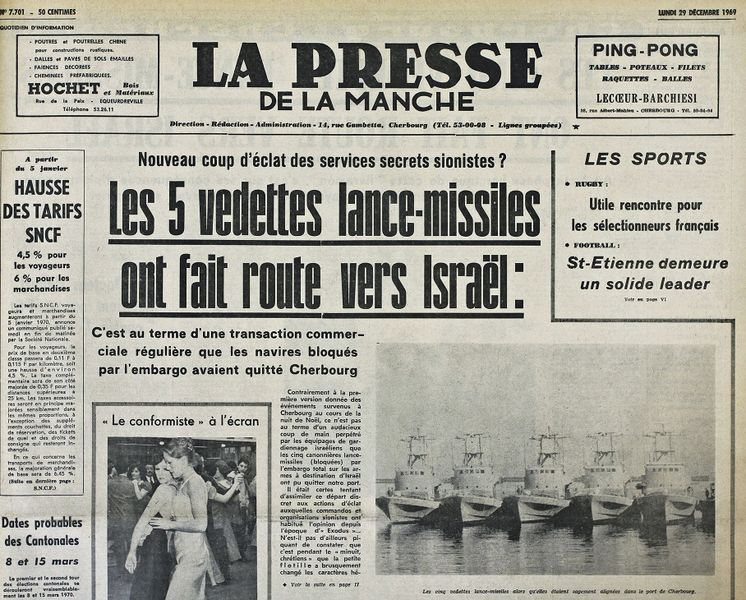
La Presse de la Manche - The Vedettes Affair

Marc Giustiniani, CEO of La Presse de la Manche, forbade his correspondent journalists from revealing the departure, on Christmas night, of five boats purchased by Israel in violation of an embargo. He insisted, against the opinion of his editorial staff, which included Paul Ingouf, René Moirand, and Guy Mabire, citing his ties to the constructor, Félix Amiot Shipyards, and the harm that such a revelation could do to the local economy. However, he offered an interview with Félix Amiot so he could explain himself in the Saturday edition. René Moirand, assigned to conduct the interview, could not reach him, as the industrialist had gone away for the weekend.

Against Giustiniani's wishes, Guy Mabire and André Lemesle informed their collaborators at the Daily Telegraph and Ouest-France, as well as the Agence centrale de presse. The latter published a report on the afternoon of December 26, which was then picked up by radio stations, television, and newspapers worldwide. La Presse de la Manche eventually relented, but since it did not publish on Sundays, it only reported the story in its Monday, December 29 edition.

=== The Luchaire Affair ===
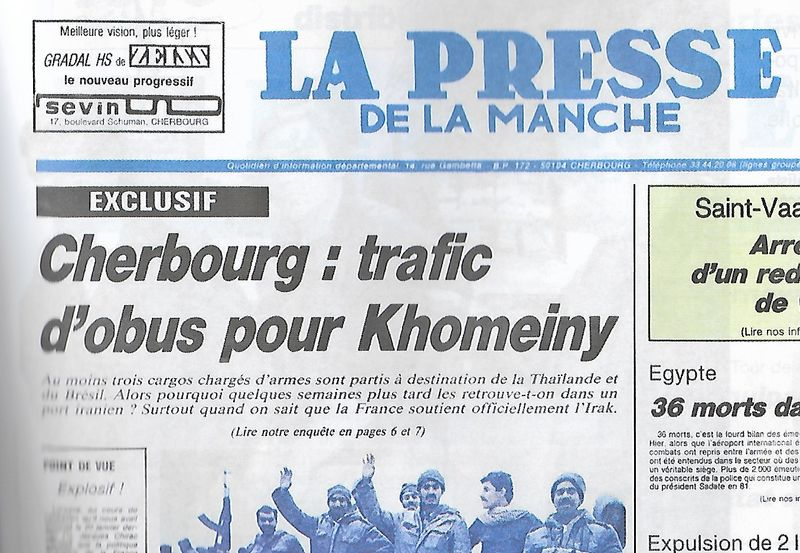
La Presse de la Manche - The Luchaire case

In 1986, the newspaper revealed an arms trafficking case in the commercial port, sparking the Luchaire Affair, a national scandal. On February 28, the daily made front-page news with a report on a "traffic of shells for Khomeini." Three cargo ships had delivered weapons to Iran, despite the embargo imposed on the country. Picked up by AFP, the story made national headlines, compromising the Fabius Government, particularly Defense Minister Charles Hernu.

This investigation was the work of two journalists: Daniel Jubert and Jean-Pierre Beuve. Jubert detailed the routes of two ships, Nicole and Trautenfels, while Beuve verified maritime routes as a Coutances correspondent. The two journalists were awarded the Mumm Foundation prize for their work in 1987.

== Economic model ==
The newspaper's business model relies on subscriptions, single-copy sales, legal notices, and advertising. Additionally, revenue is supplemented by organizing events, such as the Foulées de la Presse de la Manche (a foot race held annually since 1982) and a housing expo in Cherbourg, held annually since 1983. The paper also hosts an annual La Presse de la Manche personalities evening.

In 2018, the company posted a turnover of 12.6 million euros, with half coming from single-copy sales and subscriptions.

La Presse de la Manche owns its printing press in Cherbourg, which also prints many of the weekly publications from the Publihebdos group.

== Organization ==
=== Directors ===
- Marc Giustiniani (1953–1985)
- Jeannette Giustiniani (1985–1990)
- Emmanuel Hutin (1990–1998)
- Marcel Clairet (1998–2016)
- Francis Gaunand (2016-)

=== Staff ===
The editorial team is based in the heart of Cherbourg and operates two regional offices, one in Valognes and another, established in the 1970s, in Saint-Lô. In 2019, the newspaper employed around 100 people, with 33 journalists on staff, including four sports journalists.

=== Notable journalists ===
- Jean-Pierre Beuve
- Daniel Jubert
- Philippe Lebarillier
- Jean Levallois
- Guy Mabire
- Laurent Vicomte

=== Distribution ===
The daily's total circulation figures, according to ACPM (formerly OJD), are as follows:

Date	2001	2002	2003	2004	2005	2006	2007	2008	2009	2010	2011	2012	2013	2014
Total distribution	26,995	26,599	26,359	26,387	26,014	25,873	25,903	25,862	25,574	25,299	25,103	24,552	23,884	23,719

Date	2015	2016	2017	2018	2019	2020	2021	2022	2023	2024
Total distribution	22,088	22,153	21,298	20,709	20,183	19,812	19,405	18,684	17,794	NC

The decline in paper circulation has been offset by a rise in digital subscriptions and website visits. The site recorded 41.2 million visitors in 2023 (compared to 30 million in 2021).

== Gallery ==
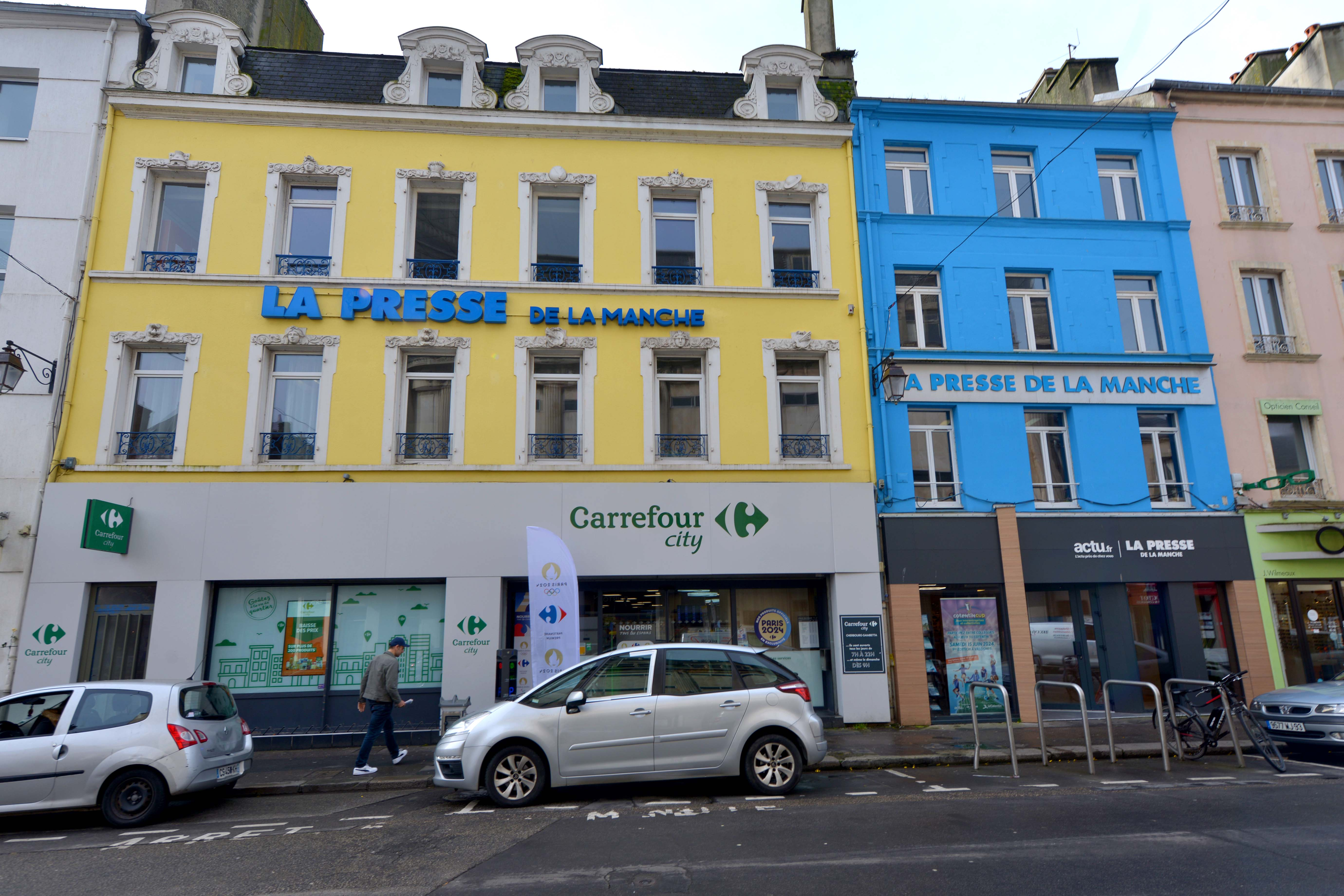

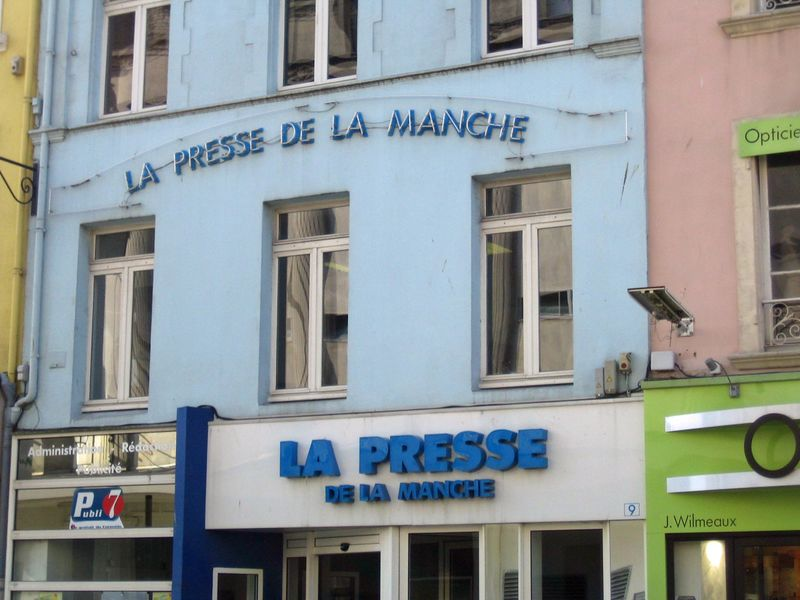

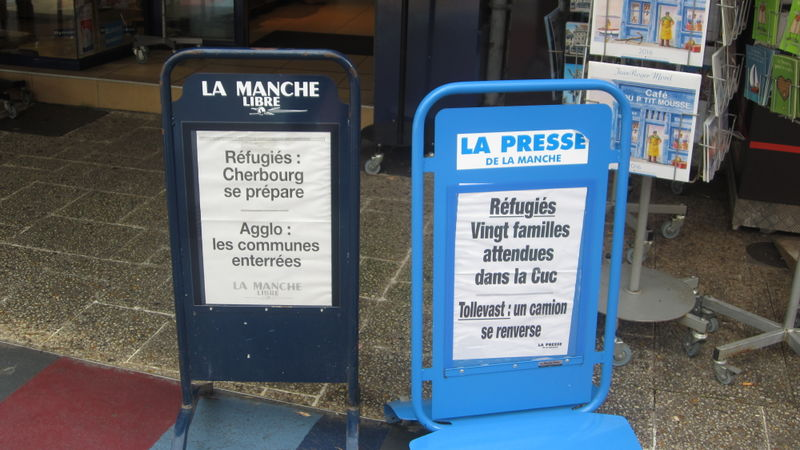

== See also ==
- Ouest-France

== Bibliography ==
=== Academic work ===
- Mathien, Michel (1986–1993). La presse quotidienne régionale (in French). Presses Universitaires de France.

=== Books ===
- Muratori-Philip, Anne (1974). La presse quotidienne régionale française (in French). I.P.E.C.
- Silar, Raymond (2010). Histoires vraies de la presse régionale. La somme de toutes les vies (in French). L'Harmattan.
- Dans les coulisses d'un journal : 1889-2019, 130 ans d'info locale (in French). La Presse de la Manche. 2019.
