= Retz (disambiguation) =

Retz is a town in Austria.

Retz may also refer to:

== Geography ==
- Pays de Retz, a historical subregion of France
- Retz, Virginia, an unincorporated community in the U.S. state of Virginia

== People ==
- Franz Retz (1673–1750), 18th century Bohemian Jesuit

== See also ==
- De Retz
