= Lille Comics Festival =

Since 2006, the Lille Comics Festival is the main British and American comic books convention in the north of France, held in November, on the first week end. It occurs in Lille, capital of French Flanders. It is also a gathering of the community of fans, back-issues dealers (drawn from French and Belgian areas) and notable comics creators (signing and drawing sessions). In 2007, for the first time, the Prix Seth Fisher (Seth Fisher Award, named after the artist Seth Fisher) was given to Alan Davis for his achievement in comic books. Attractions include action figures retailers, artwork selling, gaming and drawing lessons for children.

== Location and dates ==
Dates	Location	Attendees	Notable guests	Notes
December 8–9, 2006	Sugar Hall (Hall aux Sucres)	200	Mike Carey, D'Israeli, Jamie Delano, Glenn Fabry, Adi Granov, Éric Hérenguel, Jock, Kevin Crossley, Dave Kendall, Roger Landridge, Dom Reardon, Paul Renaud, Liam Sharp, Emily Hare, Emma Simcock Tooth, Bryan Talbot, Chris Weston	Also called Festival de la bande dessinée Anglo-saxonne
November 3–4, 2007	Sugar Hall (Hall aux Sucres)	900	Alan Davis, Marko Djurdjevic, David Guile, Gene Ha, Éric Hérenguel, Barry Kitson, John McCrea, Gérald Parel, Stéphanie Hans, Paul Renaud, Phil Winslade, Benjamin Zhang Bin	First Seth Fisher Award
November 1–2, 2008	Sugar Hall (Hall aux Sucres)	1400	Charlie Adlard, Phil Winslade, Simon Bisley, Doug Braithwaite, Andy Brown, Philippe Cardona, Glenn Fabry, Sylvain Guinebaud, Niko Henrichon, Barry Kitson, Frazer Irving, Adi Granov, Cyril Pontet, Paul Renaud, François Duprat, Vanyda	Seth Fisher Award : Simon Bisley
October 31 & November 1, 2009	Sugar Hall (Hall aux Sucres)	1100	David Aja, Mitch Breitweiser, Fred Beltran, Nicolas Demare, Gary Erskine, Michael Golden, Sylvain Guinebaud, Niko Henrichon, Karl Kerschl, Barry Kitson, Laurent Libessart, Chris Malgrain, Alain Mauricet, Pierre Minne, Gérald Parel, Ramon Perez, Cyril Pontet, Cameron Stewart, Mark Texeira, Phil Winslade, Renée Witterstaetter	-
