= Dofus – Book 1: Julith =

2015 animated fantasy film

- French theatrical release poster
- Dofus, livre 1: Julith (French)
- Directed by: Anthony Roux; Jean Jacques Denis
- Screenplay by: Anthony Roux; Olivier Vannelle
- Story by: Anthony Roux
- Based on: Dofus & Wakfu by Anthony Roux
- Music by: Guillaume Houzé
- Production companies: Ankama Animation; France 3 Cinema; Pictanovo
- Distributed by: Gebeka Films
- Release dates: 7 November 2015 (Arras Film Festival); 3 February 2016 (France)
- Running time: 108 minutes
- Country: France
- Languages: French; English; Spanish; Portuguese
- Budget: €7.5 million
- Box office: $624,747

Dofus – Book 1: Julith (French: Dofus, livre 1: Julith) is a 2015 French animated fantasy film directed by Anthony Roux and Jean Jacques Denis, from a screenplay by Roux and Olivier Vannelle. Based on the 2004 video game Dofus and its sequel Wakfu, the film is set in the Krosmoz fictional universe. Dofus – Book 1: Julith was produced by Ankama Animation, and co-produced by France 3 Cinema and Pictanovo. It had its world premiere at the Arras Film Festival on 7 November 2015, before being released in French cinemas on 3 February 2016. Despite receiving a generally positive critical reception, the film was a massive box office bomb, grossing only $624,747 against a €7.5 million budget.

== Premise ==
Joris Jurgen lives with his adoptive father Kerubim Crépin, an old anthropomorphic cat, in the peaceful city of Bonta. One day, the despicable Julith, who possesses great magical powers, tries to steal the Ebony Dofus—a dragon egg that contains unimaginable power. With the newly befriended Khan and Bakara, Joris must try to save the city from the clutches of Julith.

== Voice cast ==
Character	French voice actor	English voice actor
Julith	Laëtitia Lefebvre	Sara Secora
Bakara	Elisabeth Ventura	Crystal Lopez
Joris	Sauvane Delanoe	Rosana Smith
Lilotte	Claire Barabat	Christina Costello
Kerub Crepin	Jean-Claude Donda	Marcus Rothenberg
Luis	Francois Siener	JD Kaye
Guy	Mathias Kozlowski	N/A
Khan Karkass	Emmanuel Gradi	Kyle Phillips
Atcham	Bernard Alane	Jason Kesser
Dardondakal	Patrick Poivey	Chuck Huber
Marline	Marc Saez	Jonathan Torres
Grimalkan Twin #1	Laurence Breheret	Rebecca Chiara Marano
Grimalkan Twin #2	Laurence Breheret	Yenni Ann
King of Bonta	Philippe Catoire	Joey Sourlis
Leon Zitroll	Xavier Fagnon	Kristian Cardenas

== Production ==
The budget for the film was €7.5 million. The soundtrack was composed by Guillaume Houzé, with songs performed by the National Orchestra of Lille and Star Pop Orchestra. The soundtrack was released as a compact disc (CD) on 16 January 2016.

== Release ==
Dofus – Book 1: Julith had its world premiere at the Arras Film Festival on 7 November 2015, before being released theatrically in French on 3 February 2016. The film was a box office bomb, grossing $624,747 at the French box office.

English, Spanish and Portuguese dubs of the film were released on YouTube on October 16, 2026.
