= Paul Renaud =

French comic book artist and illustrator

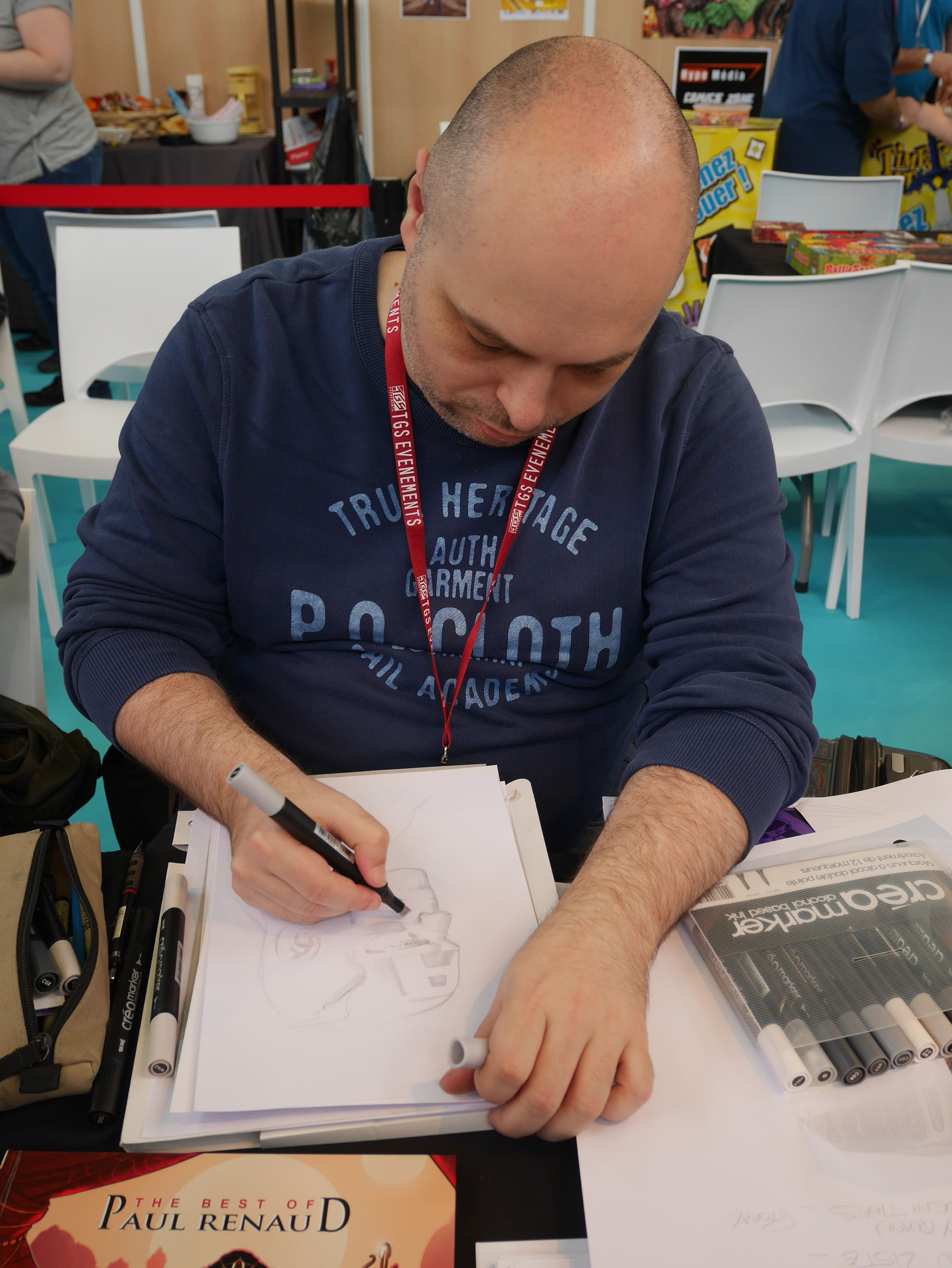
Paul Renaud

Paul Renaud (born 1975) is a French comic book artist and illustrator, and working for both European and American markets.

In 2004 Budd Root's Basement comics published Paul Renaud 's Cavewoman: The Movie comic book. Other American publishers Renaud has done work for include Image Comics (Fear Agent #8, Invincible), and Dynamite Entertainment (Red Sonja and Athena).

Renaud cover work for Dynamite include Warlord of Mars: Dejah Thoris, The Darkness Vs. Eva, Vampirella, Danger Girl and Army of Darkness, The Green Hornet: Parallel Lives.

His cover work for Marvel Comics includes "War of Kings", Timestorm 2009-2099, All-New Savage She-Hulk, Astonishing X-Men, Thunderbolts, Ms. Marvel.

In 2014, Renaud did the interior art and colors on Uncanny Avengers Annual #1 and Captain America #24. In 2015 came Secret Wars #0, S.H.I.E.L.D #6, and Sam Wilson: Captain America #4.

Renaud frequently does the coloring on his comics, or work with colorist Romulo Fajardo Jr.

== Bibliography ==
- Cavewoman (script and art, Amryl/Basement Comics)
  - Jungle Jam #1 (August 2006)
  - Jungle Jam #2 (late Fall 2006)
- Fear Agent #8 (back-up story, Image Comics, September 2006. Reprinted in 2008 in Dark Horse Comics trade paperback Tales of the Fear Agent
- Red Sonja #17 (cover art, regular edition, sketch edition variant, negative art edition variant) Dynamite Entertainment, October 2006)
- Red Sonja #25 (cover art, regular edition, Dynamite Entertainment, 2007)
- Sword of Red Sonja: Doom of the Gods #1-4 (cover art, regular editions, Dynamite Entertainment, 2007)
- Red Sonja: Vacant Shell (cover art, regular edition, sketch edition variant, interior art, Dynamite Entertainment, 2007). The one-shot was later reprinted in the trade paperback Red Sonja: Travels volume one by Dynamite Entertainment.
- Astonishing X-Men #31 French edition (cover art Variant edition Panini Comics, December 2007)
- The Darkness Vs Eva: Daughter of Dracula #1-4 (cover art, regular editions, Dynamite Entertainment, Top Cow, 2008)
- Red Sonja #31 (cover art (regular edition) Dynamite Entertainment, 2008)
- Red Sonja: Vacant Shell One-Shot Black and White edition (cover art Dynamite Entertainment, 2008)
- Red Sonja #40 (cover art (regular edition) Dynamite Entertainment, 2008)
- Hawkeye and Mockingbird (Marvel Comics 2011)
- Avengers World #11 Cover (Marvel Comics 2014)
- Uncanny Avengers Annual #1 variant cover, art and colors (Marvel 2014)
- Uncanny Avengers #24 Cover (Marvel Comics 2014)
- Uncanny Avengers #25 Cover (Marvel Comics 2014)
- Captain America #24 10 pages interior (Marvel Comics 2014)
- Uncanny Avengers (Reprint of Uncanny Avengers Annual #1) (Marvel Comics 2015)
- S.H.I.E.L.D. #6 interior (Marvel 2015)
- Avengers: No More Bullying Cover (Marvel Comics 2015)
- Secret Wars #0 FCBD 2015 art and colors (Marvel Comics 2015)
- Sam Wilson: Captain America #4
- Best of Paul Renaud Artbook 64 page reprinting Paul Renaud's covers (Dark Dragon Books 2014)
- Star Wars #1 (variant cover Fantastico) Cover (Marvel Comics 2014)
- Star Wars #1 (variant cover Hot Topic) cover (Marvel Comics 2014)
- Star Wars #1 (France) couverture n°14, cover collector done by Panini Comics
