= Islands of Wakfu =

2011 video game

- Developer: Ankama Play
- Publisher: Microsoft Studios
- Designer: Jean Briguet
- Series: Dofus
- Engine: XNA
- Platform: Xbox 360
- Release: March 30, 2011
- Genre: Action-adventure
- Modes: Single-player, multiplayer

Islands of Wakfu is an action-adventure game developed by Ankama Play and published by Microsoft Studios for the Xbox 360's Xbox Live Arcade service. It is set in the universe of Dofus 10,000 years before the events of the game and is a spin-off of the MMORPG Wakfu.

== Gameplay ==
Islands of Wakfu's three playable characters; Efrim (left), The Platypus (middle) and Nora (far right).

Islands of Wakfu features colorful 2D visuals and is played from an isometric perspective. It features a total of three playable characters (Nora, Efrim and The Platypus) and incorporates a unique blend of beat 'em up, shoot 'em up and puzzle elements.

The game can be played solo or local cooperatively. When played solo, the player can switch between characters Nora and Efrim simultaneously. Whereas, the first player controls Nora and the second, Efrim, if playing co-op. The third playable character, The Platypus, can be controlled when playing as Efrim, by default.

== Plot ==
The story takes place in a Dark fantasy universe, in the game, players assume the roles of Nora (the last surviving Eliatrope) and her dragon brother Efrim of whom are on a mission to reserve and restore the remains of their world, after a meteorite crashed on a nearby planet, reviving a malevolent curse.

== Development and release ==
The game was officially announced in a December 18, 2008 press report by Ankama Play for a planned late 2009 release. However, the 2009 release date was later changed to Spring 2011.
