= Welsh & Shedar =

French-Japanese anime television series

- Key visual

蒼き伝承 ウェルシュ＆シェダー (Aoki Denshō Werushu & Shedā)
- Genre: Fantasy
- Created by: Tot
- Anime television series
- Directed by: Naoki Horiuchi
- Written by: FR: Tot; JP: Kenichi Yamashita
- Music by: Pierre-Jean Beaudoin; Jose Pavli
- Studio: Studio Massket
- Licensed by: WW: Ankama
- Original network: Tokyo MX
- Original run: October 2, 2026 – present
- Episodes: 12
- icon

Welsh & Shedar
- Author: Lily Roux
- Illustrator: Mig
- Publisher: Ankama
- Webtoon service: Allskreen (French); Ankama Launcher (English)
- Original run: November 11, 2026 – present

Welsh & Shedar (Japanese: 蒼き伝承 ウェルシュ＆シェダー, Hepburn: Aoki Denshō Werushu & Shedā; lit. 'The Azure Legend: Welsh & Shedar') is an original French-Japanese anime television series created by Tot, who also handles the screenplays and series composition concepts, produced by Ankama and Studio Dream Catcher, and animated by Studio Massket. The series premiered in October 2026. A webtoon adaptation written by Lily Roux and illustrated by Mig began serialization online on Ankama's Allskreen and Ankama Launcher services in November 2026.

== Plot ==
Set in the world of Dofus, the series follows Welsh, a kind-hearted cook whose quiet life in Brassica is shattered when the dragon Asalar and the hero Joris arrive. Thrust into a perilous conflict involving the formidable Queen Zabelle and her son, Shedar, Welsh must navigate royal intrigue and dark magic to uncover secrets about his past that could reshape his destiny.

== Characters ==
Welsh
Voiced by: Rikuya Yasuda (Japanese), Sacha Tomassian (French), Daniel J. McLean (English)
Shedar
Voiced by: Yuki Kaji (Japanese), Tom Trouffier (French), Kevin Garcia (English)
Zabelle
Voiced by: Yūko Kaida (Japanese), Frédérique Tirmont (French), Marissa Lenti (English)
Joris
Voiced by: Makoto Furukawa (Japanese), Yoann Bellot-Sover (French), Elgin David Aponte (English)
Bechamel
Voiced by: Risa Kayama (Japanese), Laëtitia Godès (French), Roo Ryder (English)
Khan Karkas
Voiced by: Wataru Takagi (Japanese), Emmanuel Gradi (French), Kyle Phillips (English)
Asalar
Voiced by: Show Hayami (Japanese), Florian Wormser (French), Crist Jarrett (English)
Mama Caroni
Voiced by: Risa Hayamizu (Japanese), Magali Rosensweig (French), Christina Groom (English)

== Media ==
=== Anime ===
The first episode was screened at the 2025 Annecy International Animation Film Festival on May 14, 2025. A preview of the series was screened out of competition at the 2026 Series Mania. The first two episodes of the series were screened at the 2026 Japan Expo on July 12, 2026.

It is animated by Studio Massket and directed by Naoki Horiuchi, with Kenichi Yamashita handling series composition for the original Japanese version, Saori Nakashiki designing the characters, and Pierre-Jean Beaudoin and Jose Pavli composing the music. The series premiered on October 2, 2026, on Tokyo MX, and will have 12 episodes. The opening theme song is "Bokura no Mirai e" (僕らの未来へ; 'To Our Future'), performed by Hironobu Kageyama and Masami Okui, and the ending theme song is "Omelette" (オムレツ), performed by Kageyama, with the insert song "I'm in you", performed by Kageyama and Kuko. Ankama started streaming the series worldwide on the new Krosmoz YouTube channel on November 5 of the same year.

==== Episodes ====
No.	Title	Directed by (Note: Production staff information is taken from the ending credits of each episode.)	Written by	Storyboarded by	Original release date
1	"Mushroom Pie"; Transliteration: "Kinoko no Pai" (Japanese: キノコのパイ)	Naoki Horiuchi	FR: Tot; JP: Kenichi Yamashita	Sun Meng	October 2, 2026
2	"Cheese Omelet"; Transliteration: "Chīzu aji no Omuretsu" (Japanese: チーズ味のオムレツ)	Unknown	Unknown	TBA	October 9, 2026
3	"Licorice Tea / A Taste of Licorice"; Transliteration: "Rikorisu Tī" (Japanese: リコリス・ティー)	Unknown	Unknown	TBA	October 16, 2026
4	"Caramelized Kebabs"; Transliteration: "Kushiyaki no Kyaramerize" (Japanese: 串焼きのキャラメリゼ)	Unknown	Unknown	TBA	October 23, 2026
5	Transliteration: "Gyūniku no Bīru Nikomi" (Japanese: 牛肉のビール煮込み)	TBA	TBA	TBA	October 30, 2026
6	Transliteration: "Niku to Gyokai no Guriru" (Japanese: 肉と魚介のグリル)	TBA	TBA	TBA	November 6, 2026
7	Transliteration: "Zaberu no Shokutaku" (Japanese: ザベルの食卓)	TBA	TBA	TBA	November 13, 2026
8	Transliteration: "Neko no Buiyon" (Japanese: 猫のブイヨン)	TBA	TBA	TBA	November 20, 2026

=== Webtoon ===
A webtoon adaptation written by Lily Roux and illustrated by Mig began serialization online on Ankama's Allskreen and Ankama Launcher services on November 11, 2026.
