= Laurent Vicomte =

French comic book author (1956–2020)

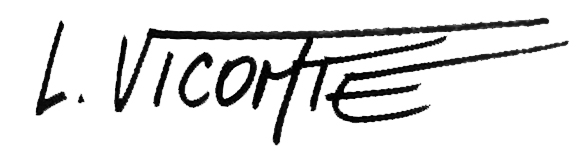
- Signature of Laurent Vicomte
- Born: 25 March 1956; Sainte-Adresse, France
- Died: 9 August 2020 (aged 64)
- Occupation: Comic book author

Laurent Vicomte (25 March 1956 – 9 August 2020) was a French comic book author. Despite his relatively small quantity of series published, he won numerous awards for his works.

== Biography ==
Vicomte's first works appeared in 1975 in the daily newspaper La Presse de la Manche, which entrusted him with the production of advertisements, then the Carte blanche section of Spirou. He moved to Paris in 1977, where he met Jean-Pierre Gourmelen, author of Gus and Ainsifutil, and Jean-Michel Charlier, then editor-in-chief of Tintin. Vicomte published his first series in Tintin, titled Edouard et Lucie. He wrote numerous, more illustrious, series in various Scouting magazines.

In 1981, Vicomte met Pierre Makyo, who was also a beginner to comics at the time. Together, they co-wrote Balade au bout du monde, a series first published in Gomme !, then published in Circus. It was published as a standalone comic book by Glénat Editions, which was noticed by then-Mayor of Paris Jacques Chirac, who gave Makyo and Vicomte the Grand Prix de la Ville de Paris.

Balade au bout du monde became one of the best-selling comic strips of the 1980s, and helped Vicomte gain notoriety as an author. However, he never published any more volumes of the series after 1989, handing the series over to Éric Hérenguel and leaving Paris to settle in Perros-Guirec. There, he met up with his friends, Régis Loisel and Jean-Charles Kraehn, and founded the Festival de bande dessinée de Perros-Guirec. Following his settlement in Perros-Guirec, he focused almost exclusively on Sasmira, publishing the new series' first volume in 1997. He published subsequent volumes in 2000, 2004, and 2009. The complete collection was released in November 2011, and was co-designed by Claude Pelet. A documentary about Vicomte was presented at the Angoulême International Comics Festival in 2012.

Laurent Vicomte died on 9 August 2020 at the age of 64.

== Publications ==
=== Balade au bout du monde ===
- La Prison (1982)
- Le Grand Pays (1984)
- Le Bâtard (1985)
- La Pierre De Folie (1989)

=== Sasmira ===
- L'Appel (1997)
- La Fausse Note (2011)
- Rien (2016)
- La Petite boîte rouge (2018)

=== La Petite boîte rouge ===
- Le Signe du chat (1985)
- La Ville endormie (1990)

=== Divers ===
- Clopin (1985)
- Madagascar, ma terre oubliée (2001)
