= Freaks' Squeele =

Comic series

Freak's Squeele

Publication information
- Publisher: Ankama
- Genre: Comics, manga-style

Freaks' Squeele (« Frics scouile » with the French accent) is a comic series drawn and written by Florent Maudoux.

== Publication history ==
The comic series was first published in 2008 under the French comics publisher Ankama Éditions. In 2025, American comic publisher Magnetic Press launched a Kickstarter to help release a translated and remastered edition of the comic series in the United States. Magnetic Press began releasing the first volumes of the series on June 2026.

The series comprises seven volumes.

== Synopsis ==
Chance, Xiong Mao and Ombre are three students enrolled in the Academical Studies of the Hero Faculty (ASHF), one of the superhero academies.

Between strategy lessons and personal branding homework, they encounter many difficulties with the head of their faculty, fellow students and students from other universities. After housing problems, they decided to live together in a tower of the campus.

=== Main characters ===
==== Chance d'Estaing ====
A young demon girl, having a human appearance but she also has two little horns on the forehead and two demonic wings in the back, like a bat. Despite having wings, she can only glide. During the group's secret operations, her code name is Blackbird.

Exuberant, she is always ready to embark on crazy plans and to advocate nudity when circumstances seem to lend it the least. Extremely frail, she has almost no strength but is very flexible. She is adopted and has seven little brothers, which gave her some knowledge of fencing. Her mother is unknown, but it is known from Volume 5 that her father is the devil himself (Cernunnos) and that her demonic name is Pipistrelle.

She began a strong relationship with the professor of law faculty, Funeral from Volume 3, after he took her under his wing to teach her how to fight.

Since volume 3, she has an extremely strong and sharp sword, Razorback. This sword is powerful enough to give her the power to win the duel between universities.

==== Ombre de Loup ====
A gigantic lupine being known for being extremely strong, he has a discreet, shy and tranquil personality. He presents himself as werewolf who isn't going to return to his human form. During the operations with his teammates he adopts the codename Airwolf.

In a previous time, he was a member of a group of commando, but his nature drove him apart from humans. As a double spy for mother nature, he sometime has to present a report of the state of his mission before the creatures of the forest. He used to live deep in the forest but was kicked out due to defending Valkyrie from a bear.

Even though of his timid and calm behaviour, he feels attracted to Xiong Mao.

==== Li Xiong Mao ====
She is a young mixed (white-Asian) human without a superpower, which she compensates for with her talents in "flamendo", a fictitious kind of martial art based on flamenco and aikido. She is also an expert blacksmith and makes weapons for herself and her friends.
