= Le Courrier du pays de Retz =

French local newspaper

- Type: weekly
- Format: 42cm
- Owner: Publihebdos
- Editor-in-chief: Frédéric Prot
- General manager: Éric Lechat
- Founded: 1844; 182 years ago
- Language: fr
- Headquarters: Pornic
- Country: France
- Circulation: 13415 (as of 2012)
- ISSN: 1298-3233
- OCLC number: 473759432
- Website: www.lecourrierdupaysderetz.fr
- Free online archives: actu.fr/archives

Le Courrier du pays de Retz is a French weekly regional information newspaper created in 1844 and distributed on Fridays in the Pays de Retz area, in the department of Loire-Atlantique.

== History ==
The first issue of L'Écho de Paimbœuf, a weekly journal of literary and maritime advertisements, appeared in 1844 in Paimbœuf, then a sub-prefecture of Loire-Inférieure. Inspired by a bourgeoisie of commerce and shipowners, printed on site, this title expanded its distribution area at the same time as the town that saw it born declined. Composed for a long time of a simple two-sided leaflet, the newspaper asserted its local roots and gradually become the organ of expression of the entire Pays de Retz. Owned by a small family group, it ceased to appear in 1944 at about the same time as Paimboeuf fell within the Saint-Nazaire pocket.

Publication resumed from 1946 under the name: Le Courrier de Paimbœuf. The newspaper grew, relied on a network of local correspondents, introduced photography and, in 1970, recruited its first team of journalists and salespeople. In 1996, the title was bought by the France-Antilles group (since renamed the Hersant Media group). It was renamed Le Courrier du pays de Retz and left its historic birthplace to settle in Pornic, which had since become the principal town of the Pays de Retz.

In 2008, the weekly was bought by the Publihebdos press group, a subsidiary of the groupe SIPA - Ouest-France, with around fifteen other titles from the Hersant Media group, including L'Écho de la Presqu'île, (Guérande), L'Éclaireur (Châteaubriant) or Le Journal de Vitré (Vitré).

== Distribution ==
Le Courrier du pays de Retz is published on Fridays. It is distributed in all the cantons of the eponymous area (Bouaye, Bourgneuf-en-Retz, Le Pellerin, Legé, Machecoul, Paimbœuf, Pornic, Saint-Père-en-Retz and Saint-Philbert-de-Grand-Lieu), certain cantons of the vicinity of Nantes (Nantes, Rezé, Saint-Herblain), that of Saint-Nazaire in the vicinity of Guérande plus the town of Geneston located in the vignoble (wine-growing) area south of Nantes.

== Bibliography ==
- Leguen, Marcel (27 March 2002). Deux siècles de presse écrite en Bretagne [Two centuries of written press in Brittany] (in French). Spézet: Coop Breizh. ISBN 2-84346-115-4.

== See also ==
- Presse écrite régionale en France
