= Éric Hérenguel =

French comics artist and comic book creator

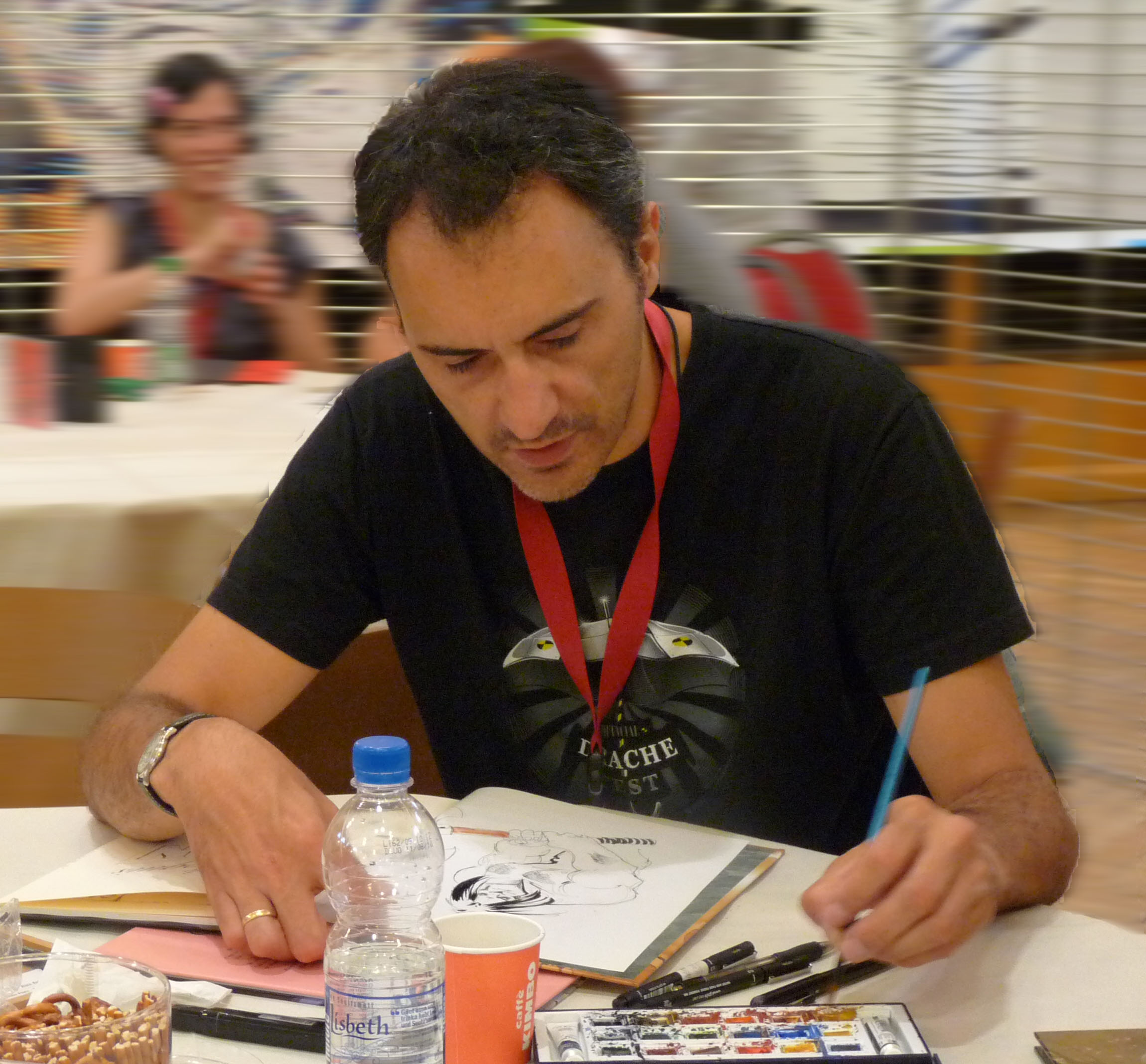
- Born: Éric Hérenguel; 20 October 1966 Douai, France
- Areas: Writer, Artist
- Pseudonym: Elrico
- Notable works: Edward John Trelawnay; Krän le Barbare
- Collaborators: Jean Wacquet, Dieter, Makyo

Eric Herenguel (born 1966) is a French comics artist and comic book creator.

== Biography ==
Hérenguel made his debut in 1986 with the Jean-Pierre Croquet's short stories for Tintin magazine. When the Journal de Tintin publication ceased, he worked for two years at a publicist's. His work is clearly influenced by movies (mainly science fiction). His first series was Carnivores written by Jean Wacquet. He did the interior work on Ballade au bout du Monde (issues #5 to #8 written by Makyo). Later, he collaborated with Dieter on Les Mémoires d'Edward John Trelawnay, inspired by the real privateer Edward John Trelawny but in a science fiction universe with some fantasy elements. Then, in 1999, he created Krän ("crâne" which means skull in French), a series of fantasy comic books published in France by Vent d'Ouest. The series is a parody of sword and sorcery stories and specifically the role-playing game Dungeons & Dragons (Krän, the main character is a barbarian). Hérenguel's tongue-in-cheek sci-fi strip Kiliwatch which appeared in Lanfeust magazine was published in integral form by Editions Caurette. He currently works as a scriptwriter on the Wakfu series of cartoons for Ankama and as a draftsman for Delcourt.

== Works ==
This list is not exhaustive.

- Kiliwatch, 2016, Caurette Editions, 80 p., ISBN 979-10-96315-02-4
- The Kong Crew, Caurette Editions (English comic books in black and white)
  - Ep 1 "Manhattan Jungle", 2018
  - Ep 2 "Worse than Hell", 2019, ISBN 979-10-96315-21-5
  - Ep. 3 "Hudson Megalodon", 2021, ISBN 979-10-96315-65-9
  - Ep. 4 "Teeth Avenue", 2022, ISBN 978-2-38289-011-0
  - Ep. 5 "Upper Beast Side", 2023, ISBN 978-2-38289-068-4
  - Ep. 6 "Central Dark", 2024, ISBN 978-2-38289-120-9
  - Ep. 7 "Blast Exit!", 2025, ISBN 978-2-38289-141-4
- The Kong Crew, Ankama Editions (French color edition of Caurette comics)
  - Manhattan Jungle, 2019, ISBN 979-1-03-351127-4
  - Hudson Mégalodon, 2021, ISBN 979-1-03-351330-8
  - Central Dark, 2024, ISBN 979-10-335-1727-6
- The Kong Crew - Deluxe Edition, 2021, Caurette Editions, 152 p., ISBN 979-10-96315-46-8
- The Kong Crew - Complete (in black and white), 2024, Caurette Editions, ISBN 978-2-38289-135-3
