= De Retz =

De Retz may refer to:

== People ==
- Henri de Gondi, duc de Retz (1590–1659), French nobleman of the Gondi family
- Jean-Georges du Croiset de Retz, French Navy officer
- Jean François Paul de Gondi (1613–1679), Cardinal de Retz, Archbishop of Paris (1654–1652)

== Places ==
- Désert de Retz, garden on the edge of the Forêt de Marly in central France
- Pays de Retz, historical subregion of France
- Pornic Agglo Pays de Retz, French agglomeration community

== Others ==
- Gilles de Retz (horse) (1953–1969), British racehorse
- Le Courrier du pays de Retz, French weekly regional information newspaper
