= Haute Autorité pour la transparence de la vie publique =

French administrative agency

Independent administrative authority overview
- Formed: 19 December 2013; 11 years ago
- Independent administrative authority executive: Patrick Matet
- Website: www.hatvp.fr

The Haute Autorité pour la transparence de la vie publique (HATVP, lit. High Authority for the transparency of public life) is an independent French administrative authority created by the law on transparency of public life on 11 October 2013. It replaced the Commission pour la transparence financière de la vie politique (lit. Commission for the financial transparency of politics). The authority is responsible for ascertaining and preventing potential conflicts of interest among French public servants and officials.

== History ==
Until 1989, the investigation and application of ethical problems, which included conflicts of interest or chronicles, were included in criminal proceedings, but had no special laws or authority to deal with such affairs until the Luchaire Affair that took place between 1982 and 1986. During the tenure of Charles Hernu, France supplied shells to Iran. The newspaper La Presse de la Manche and a report of the Contrôle général des armées published by L'Express in January 1987 revealed that end-user certificates were falsified to show destinations other than Iran, as the country was under an arms embargo at the time.

After this scandal, the first "transparency of public life" law was passed; it defined the state funding of political parties and mandated some public servants to publish their financial status. However, this law was very vague and unclear in some aspects.

In 1994, a parliamentary working group led by Philippe Séguin made 18 proposals including the limitation of election expenses, the reformation of the status of political parties, and the extension of the mandatory declaration of status to more categories of public servants.

On 14 January 2020, the High Authority received three delegates from the European Commission.

On April 10, 2013, after the Cahuzac affair, the HATVP was created.

== Missions ==
The main missions of the HATVP are:

- To prevent conflicts of interest for key public servants
- To inspect any significant changes to the net assets of public servants during their service (as an anti-fraud measure)
- To inspect faulty or fraudulent declarations of Conflict of Interest or assets of public servants
- To oversee "revolving door" behaviors among former and present public servants
- To oversee lobbying

== Composition ==
The HATVP is composed of:

- A president
- Two members elected by the Conseil d'État
- Two members elected by the Court of Audit
- One member nominated by the president of the National Assembly
- One member nominated by the president of the Senate
