= Actu.fr =

French local news platform operated by Groupe actu

actu.fr
- Website type: News website
- Available in: French
- Headquarters: Rennes
- Country of origin: France
- Owner: Groupe actu
- Founder: Francis Gaunand
- Website: actu.fr
- Commercial: Yes
- Launched: 2017
- Current status: Active
- ISSN: 2741-5325
- OCLC number: 1402942929

Actu.fr is a French news website launched in 2017 and operated by Groupe actu, a subsidiary of the SIPA - Ouest-France Group.

== History ==
In 2017, the Actu.fr platform — bringing together the websites of its 88 regional and local weekly newspapers — was created under the leadership of Francis Gaunand, then president of the Publihebdos group.

Between 2017 and 2020, new regional editions were launched and media outlets external to the group joined the platform. In 2019, the website was among the most visited news websites in France and generated 50 million monthly visits.

In 2019, according to La Lettre A, an alliance with the Rossel–La Voix group was considered but never finalized, as the latter intended to launch a competing platform.

In 2023, the website generated 100 million visits each month.

== Editorial line and operations ==
=== Publications ===
Media outlets present on the platform

==== Hauts-de-France ====
- Actu Oise
- Actu Pas-de-Calais
- Croix du Nord
- L'Éclaireur (Gamaches)
- Le Journal d'Abbeville (Abbeville)

==== Normandy ====
===== Seine-Maritime =====
- Le Bulletin (Darnétal)
- Le Havre Infos (Le Havre), launched on 17 November 2010
- Le Journal d'Elbeuf (Elbeuf)
- La Dépêche du Pays de Bray (Forges-les-Eaux)
- Les Informations dieppoises (Dieppe)
- L'Informateur (newspaper) (Eu), acquired in July 2009 from the Royer family
- L'Éclaireur Brayon (Gournay-en-Bray)
- Le Réveil de Neufchâtel (Neufchâtel-en-Bray)
- Côté Rouen (Rouen), launched on 2 February 2011

===== Eure =====
- Le Démocrate vernonnais (Vernon)
- Eure Infos (Évreux)
- L'Éveil de Pont-Audemer (Pont-Audemer)
- L'Éveil normand (Bernay)
- La Dépêche (Évreux–Louviers–Verneuil-sur-Avre)
- Le Courrier de l'Eure (Le Neubourg)
- L'Impartial (Les Andelys) (Les Andelys)

===== Calvados =====
- L'Éveil de Lisieux-Côte (Lisieux)
- Liberté - Le Bonhomme libre (Caen)
- Les Nouvelles de Falaise (Falaise)
- La Voix - Le Bocage (Vire)
- La Renaissance du Bessin (Bayeux)
- Le Pays d'Auge (Lisieux)
- Le Républicain (Aquitaine)
- Côté Caen (Caen), launched on 8 December 2010

===== Manche =====
- La Presse de la Manche (Cherbourg-en-Cotentin)
- La Gazette de la Manche (Saint-Hilaire-du-Harcouët)
- Côté Manche (Saint-Lô), launched on 11 May 2011
- C'est à Cherbourg (Cherbourg-en-Cotentin), launched on 4 April 2018

===== Orne =====
- Le Journal de l'Orne (Argentan)
- L'Orne Hebdo (Alençon)
- Le Perche (newspaper) (Mortagne-au-Perche)
- Le Réveil normand (L'Aigle)
- Le Publicateur libre (Domfront)
- L'Orne combattante (Flers)

==== Île-de-France ====
- 78actu (Versailles)
- Actu Essonne (Évry-Courcouronnes), pure player
- Actu Val-de-Marne
- Actu Seine-St-Denis
- Actu Paris
- Actu Hauts-de-Seine
- Le Courrier de Mantes (Mantes-la-Jolie)
- Le Courrier des Yvelines (Saint-Germain-en-Laye)
- La Gazette du Val-d'Oise (Pontoise), acquired in 2005
- La République de Seine-et-Marne (Melun)
- Toutes les Nouvelles (Versailles), acquired in 2005
- La Marne (newspaper) (Meaux), acquired in 2007
- L'Écho-Le Régional (Pontoise), acquired in February 2008
- Le Pays Briard (Coulommiers), acquired in late 2010

==== Brittany ====
- La Chronique Républicaine (Fougères)
- Le Courrier Indépendant (Loudéac)
- L'Écho de l'Armor et de l'Argoat (Guingamp)
- La Gazette du Centre Morbihan (Locminé)
- Le Pays Malouin (Saint-Malo)
- Le Penthièvre (Langueux)
- Le Petit Bleu des Côtes d'Armor (Dinan)
- Le Ploërmelais (Ploërmel)
- Pontivy Journal (Pontivy)
- Presse d'Armor (Paimpol)
- Le Trégor (Lannion)
- Le Journal de Vitré (Vitré)
- Côté Brest (Brest)
- Côté Quimper (Quimper)
- Progrès de Cornouaille|L'Hebdo du Finistère (Quimper)
- Enquête d'Emploi (Quimper)
- Les Nouvelles de l'Odet (Quimper)
- Les Nouvelles du Viaduc (Morlaix)
- Actu Rennes (Rennes)
- Actu Morbihan (Vannes)

==== Pays de la Loire ====
- Les Alpes Mancelles (Sillé-le-Guillaume)
- L'Hebdo de Sèvre & Maine (Clisson)
- Les Nouvelles (newspaper) (Sablé-sur-Sarthe)
- Le Pays Yonnais (La Roche-sur-Yon)
- Les Sables Vendée Journal (Les Sables-d'Olonne)
- L'Éclaireur (newspaper) (Châteaubriant)
- Le Courrier du pays de Retz (Pornic)
- Le Courrier vendéen (Challans)
- L'Écho sarthois (La Ferté-Bernard), acquired in May 2009
- L'Écho de la Presqu'île (Guérande)
- Le Petit Courrier l'Écho de la Vallée du Loir, acquired in 2010
- Le Petit Courrier l'Écho de la Vallée du Loir (La Chartre-sur-le-Loir), acquired in June 2011

==== Nouvelle-Aquitaine ====
- Actu Bordeaux
- Actu La Rochelle
- Actu Pays Basque
- Le Républicain (Aquitaine) (Lot-et-Garonne and southern Gironde)

==== Occitania ====
- Actu Toulouse
- Côté Toulouse, launched on 19 March 2015, distributed in 45,000 copies
- Métropolitain (Montpellier)
- Voix du Midi

==== Grand Est ====
- Lorraine Actu
- Actu Strasbourg (Strasbourg)

==== Centre-Val de Loire ====
- L'Action républicaine (Nogent-le-Rotrou) (Nogent-le-Rotrou)

==== Bourgogne-Franche-Comté ====
- Voix du Jura (Lons-le-Saunier)

==== French Polynesia ====
- La Dépêche de Tahiti

==== Sports ====
- Actu Rugby
- Sport à Caen

The platform notably includes 77 paid weekly newspapers, 14 free information newspapers, and the departmental daily newspaper La Presse de la Manche. Alongside existing titles, Publihebdos created local Actu pure players (some predated the platform, such as 76actu launched in 2012 and Normandie-actu.fr in 2014).

More than 500 articles are published on the platform each day. According to Les Echos, these provide "a panorama of regional and national topics".

The website NewsGuard awarded Actu.fr its highest reliability rating and noted that it was the news site generating the most engagement on social media in 2020, 2022, and 2023.

=== Editorial partnerships ===
The media group is forming partnerships with local digital-only publishers to integrate them into the platform (in exchange for visibility and a share of the programmatic advertising revenue generated). In particular, Actu.fr has entered into a partnership with Métropolitain.

== Organization ==
The Actu.fr platform has its own editorial staff and national departments, comprising about twenty people. Based in Rennes, they work in coordination with offices located throughout France.

== Business model ==
The platform's business model relies primarily on online advertising and legal notices. (Note: Legal notices are considered indirect press subsidies. Long reserved for print publications, this market has been new for pure players since 2020.) While the site is free to access, Actu.fr has also experimented with paid content behind a paywall. In 2020, advertising revenues represented between €5 million and €6 million in turnover.

In 2022, an independent report prepared by a consulting firm mandated by the social and economic committee of Publihebdos denounced a social model described as "low-cost" journalism and poor working conditions. According to the report, pressure on journalists focused on quantitative content production rather than quality, and journalists were subject to constant numerical evaluation. The report also raised concerns over incidents that, according to the authors, could constitute sexual harassment.

A lengthy investigation by Arrêt sur images also described the work of Actu.fr journalists caught in a race for audience figures, as well as controversial recruitment practices. Sued for defamation by Nicolas Zaugra, editor-in-chief of "Actu Lyon", the two journalists responsible for the investigation were acquitted under the good-faith exception, while Zaugra was ordered to pay them "the total sum of €2,000 pursuant to article 472 of the Code of Criminal Procedure" for "abuse of civil party proceedings".

Groupe actu, which operates the Actu.fr platform, is a subsidiary of the SIPA - Ouest-France Group through SIPA (Société d'investissements et de participations), which owns 84.34% of the company. In 2010, sociology lecturer Cégolène Frisque used this example to illustrate the creation of monopolies by regional press groups that "increasingly assign themselves the role of reporting on and even promoting the activities and achievements of local authorities, becoming full-fledged actors in local life".

== Visual identity ==
Logotype from 2017 to 09 2020.

Logotype since 09 2020.
