= Cavewoman (comics) =

American alternative comic book

- Cavewoman Cover Gallery #2

Publication information
- Publisher: Basement Comics
- Schedule: Varies
- Format: Ongoing series
- Publication date: 1993–2009
- Main character: Cavewoman

Creative team
- Created by: Budd Root
- Written by: Budd Root; Bradley Walton; Rob Durham
- Artist(s): Budd Root; Devon Massey; Frank Cho; Art Adams; Rob Durham
- Penciller(s): Chad Spilker; Kevin Alsop; Kevin Rasel
- Inker(s): Barry Gregory; Ken Jeremiassen; Dan Parsons
- Colorist(s): Barry Gregory; Mike Wieringo; Rob Durham; Mitch Massey; Jim Schumaker; Mike Chen; Jenni Gregory

Cavewoman is an American alternative comic book created by writer-artist Budd Root, and published from 1993 to 2009, primarily by Basement Comics and additionally by Caliber Comics and Avatar Press. The story follows superhuman Meriem Cooper, a 19-year-old jungle woman who battles dinosaurs and other prehistoric creatures in the Cretaceous period.

Root credits the artist William Stout, as well as the Playboy cartoon feature Little Annie Fanny, as his inspirations for the character.

The artists Devon Massey and Robert Durham have done much of the cover art for the series and related one-shots and spin-offs.

== Publication history ==
Regarding the character's creation, Root commented:

Cavewoman was inspired by Little Annie Fanny and William Stout. I wanted something like "Little Annie Fanny in the Stone Age". Originally, it was going to be a T&A type of book, but it seemed like, as I was writing, it just kept on developing. Then my grandfather died after I wrote it. He had been diagnosed with some kind of inoperable tumor, and it made me think: "I'm not going to do a T&A book. Let's keep this respectable". I brought the pages (to the first issue) to show Gramp just about a week or so before he died.

He added that Meriem was "patterned after pretty much all the women I really respect. She's got a body with kind of a Little Annie Fannie face with Danni Ashe's boobs and Nina Hartley's butt".

Meriem Cooper first appeared in Basement Comics' Cavewoman #1 (Dec. 1993), the first issue of a black-and-white miniseries that ran for six issues. She reappeared in the popular eight-issue miniseries Cavewoman: Rain (1996–1997) from Caliber Comics, and Cavewoman: Odyssey #1 (1999), the only issue of a planned five-issue miniseries from Caliber Comics. She also appeared in the four-issue series Cavewoman: Missing Link (1997–1998), and the three-part series Cavewoman: Jungle Tales (1998).

During her early years, Meriem also appeared in several one-shot comics, like Cavewoman Meets Explorers (1997), jointly from Basement Comics and Explorer Press; Jungle Tales of Cavewoman (1998), released in both a standard and a mature-audience edition; and Cavewoman: Color Special (1999), reprinting a story in the comic Threshold #7.

After 2000, Meriem appeared in the ongoing series Cavewoman: Pangaean Sea. After the events of Cavewoman: Rain the town of Marshville was destroyed, and Meriem and the inhabitants migrated to the shores of the Pangaean Sea.

This was the last lengthy Cavewoman series to date, and by far the longest. The first comic Cavewoman: Pangaean Sea Prologue was first published in 1999, and the series lasted eleven issues from 2000 to 2009.

Since 2001, Meriem has starred in the semi-regular mature series Prehistoric Pin-ups, which lasted for five-issues until 2010; and Cavewoman: Meriem's Gallery, a four-part series until 2009. She has also been in the semi-annual series Cavewoman: Cover Gallery (2002–2013), and the successful five-part Cavewoman: Reloaded (2005–2009), which was a reprint of Cavewoman #1–6 with new content. Cavewoman celebrated its 10th anniversary in 2003.

Meriem has also appeared in eight two-shot comics spanning the years between 2000 and 2012, the best known are Cavewoman: Raptor (2002), and Cavewoman: Jungle Jam (2006). She was also in thirteen single-issue comics such as Klyde & Meriem (2001), Tanlines Pinup Book (2002), Cavewoman: The Movie (2003), Cavewoman: Beauties & Beasts (2005), Budd's Sketchbook of Sketchbook Sketches (2010), and Cavewoman: A Night Out (2010).

In 2013–2014, Cavewoman celebrated its 20th anniversary with the two-part issues Cavewoman: Oasis (2013), and Cavewoman: Journey (2014). Basement Comics also released nine single issues featuring Meriem, including Cavewoman: Uncovered (2013), Cavewoman: The Many Faces of Meriem (2013), Cavewoman: Labyrinth (2013), Cavewoman: Killing Dinos 101 (2014), and the Cavewoman: 20th Anniversary Show Book (2014).

In the 20 years of Cavewoman, Meriem has appeared in more than 300 separate issues of the comic, featured in 92 serial issues, and 34 one-shot issues. Meriem has also appeared in over 200 reprints and special edition issues, such as special mature content issues and new cover art issues.

== Fictional character biography ==
Cavewoman

Publication information
- Publisher: Basement Comics
- First appearance: Cavewoman #1 (Dec. 1993)
- Created by: Budd Root

In-story information
- Notable aliases: Meriem Cecilbie Cooper
- Abilities: Agility; Enhanced healing; Invulnerability; Stamina; Stealth; Super hearing; Acute sense of smell; Super speed; Super strength; Tracking; Unarmed combat

The story of Cavewoman is rooted deeply in science fiction and fantasy.

Meriem Cecilbie Cooper was born in July 1980 to parents Robert Addam Cooper and Gail Nicole Reicher, in the fictional town of Marshville, Oregon. After Robert died of unknown causes, Gail turned to drugs, which led her to fall in with an unsavory secret group of government agents. Eventually wanting to sever her ties with this group for Meriem's sake, Gail sought the help of Meriem's scientist-inventor grandfather Francis Peacock Reicher, affectionately called "Gramp". After first being thwarted, Gramp made a mysteriously superhuman return, defeating the agents easily and taking 8-year-old Meriem away on a hovercycle from the future.

At Gramp's laboratory, Meriem discovered a time machine and a body-enhancing device that allowed a living being to pass through the time stream. It is here that she first met Klyde, Gramp's 15 ft. gorilla who had been accidentally altered by the body enhancer. Gramp then enhanced Meriem as well, but accidentally sent himself, Klyde, and Meriem 70 million years into the past instead of going 70 years into the future. Thus, the trio began an ongoing adventure through time while on the run from dinosaurs and a secret branch of the government.

Meriem and Gramp settled in a large cave and began a struggle for survival. As events transpired, Gramp was killed early on by a Tyrannosaurus and Meriem left the cave. After a fierce fight with local carnivores, Meriem ended up naked when her clothes were torn off during the fight.

After more than ten years, and growing into a buxom, voluptuous 19-year-old, Meriem lived in the local jungles naked, savage, happy, and free. Dinosaurs were taught to fear her. Meriem became reunited with Klyde, who attacked her and almost killed her. She then returned to the cave. Not wanting to be naked and savage anymore, she eventually made a jungle bikini (with dinosaur teeth hanging on the strings) out of a leopard-printed snakeskin blanket. She also avenged her grandfather by slaying the Tyrannosaurus responsible for killing him, but rescued two Tyrannosaurus hatchlings from Velociraptors. One named Harmony became Meriem's companion while the other named Peace became her enemy.

Later, the whole town of Marshville is transported into a prehistoric past. When this takes place, Meriem becomes their guide and protector in the prehistoric world. The civilians had to protect themselves from the dangerous dinosaurs by building an electric fence around Marshville. She eventually leads most of the Marshville citizens safely to the Pangaean Sea.

== Powers and abilities ==
Meriem's various superhuman powers come from her enhanced molecular structure. It was altered and enhanced by Gramp, so that she could survive the rigors of time travel. Meriem stands at 5'8", weighs 350 lbs, and possesses extraordinary strength and stamina. She is strong enough to rip a Velociraptor's arm out of its socket. She has also picked up a downed street lamp. Meriem's strength also allows her to leap lengthy distances, such as between buildings in New York City, or leaping onto the top of a truck's trailer from street level. She is strong enough to leap through the forest with a full-grown man on her back.

Meriem is also highly resistant to injury. A high-caliber gunshot to the back and bites from Velociraptors have failed to penetrate her tough skin. She can survive falls from great heights, such as when she fell from a cliff to the beach. Things that have been proven able to penetrate her skin, or otherwise injure her, are attacks that are directed with great strength or force, such as a Tyrannosaurus bite, Klyde's blows, or armor-piercing ammunition.

Meriem's enhanced molecular structure gives her an enhanced healing effect that reduces the healing time of wounds. The effect is hastened proportionally to her food intake: the more food consumed, the more quick the healing. Meriem always gets hungry after she gets injured. Meriem has healed dinosaur bites, armor-piercing bullet wounds, and even a Yeti yanking off all of her head hair: the next morning she had grown her hair back. The worst injury Meriem is shown taking is when she battled a berserk Klyde during Cavewoman: Rain. Klyde beats her to the extent that she stops breathing and appears dead. She remains in this "death state" while her enhanced molecular structure slowly repairs itself, without Meriem being able to eat anything to hasten the healing process. The citizens of Marshville bury her, thinking she is truly dead, though the healing effect repairs the damage after two weeks.

Meriem also has above average running speed, described as moving at "30 miles per hour". Once, when she ran, her boyfriend Bruce had to ride after her on his motorcycle in order to keep up with her.

She is an extremely powerful swimmer and can hold her breath for long periods when fighting underwater. She has also proven resistant to the effects of drowning, being capable of expelling water from her lungs even when unconscious.

Meriem's senses of smell and hearing are also enhanced. In addition, she has psychic powers, the limits of which have not been revealed. She can see Gramp as a kind of spirit who appears to her from time to time, offering advice and insight. No one can see or hear Gramp but Meriem. She has psychic bonds with Klyde and Harmony. Meriem's sight is also extremely good: she can see an ant up to two miles away.

She is also an expert knife thrower, and can kill a pterodactyl with a thrown blade. She is also highly efficient with a knife in hand-to-hand combat, and is also an expert with a spear. Meriem is also accomplished in wrestling and boxing.

== Characters ==
=== Supporting characters ===
- Dr. Francis Peacock "Gramp" Reicher – Meriem's grandfather who is a scientist and inventor. Although dead, his spirit still speaks to Meriem in her times of need.
- Bruce Kabbit – Meriem's childhood best friend and a resident of Marshville. When meeting again in the past, Bruce becomes Meriem's lover and boyfriend.
- Klyde – a 15 ft. gorilla that came back in time with Meriem where he became a giant creature and Meriem's closest companion and protector. He has been called "the most dangerous creature to ever walk the planet...next to man".
- Harmony – Meriem's giant Tyrannosaurus companion, whom she saved from Velociraptors as a hatchling.

=== Recurring characters ===
- Robert Addam Cooper – Meriem's father who died prior to the beginning of the story.
- Gail Nicole Reicher – Meriem's mother who turned to drugs following Robert's death and fell in with some government agents at the beginning of the series. When Marshville was transported to the Cretaceous Period, Gail starts seeking redemption for how she treated her daughter.
- Carrie Fulton – Carrie is a Marshville housewife who was once abducted by a desert tribe and was rescued by Meriem.
- Cynthia Cross – the owner of a rabbit farm in Marshville.
- Mona Lansing - jealous of the attention Meriem Cooper gets, plain Mona Lansing injects a blood sample of Meriem into herself, transforming her into a hot woman.
- Fay Creighton Chaney – a former hairdresser who is now the co-owner of an ice cream parlor in Marshville.
- Francis Reicher II – he is Meriem's cousin and is named after their grandfather, but is usually referred to by his nickname of "Lumpy".
- Sgt. John Marstone – the sergeant of the Marshville Police Department, and has a huge ego.
- Maggie Matheson – a Marshville civilian who is good friends with Miriem and Nathaniel Hunt. She takes a special elixir that inhibits her transformation into a werewolf.
- Matthew Blackstone – a teenager who is the son of Nicholas and Mary Blackstone. When an electric fence was made that divided Marshville for protection from the dangerous dinosaurs, Nicholas salvaged the liquor where he and Mary got drunk and abused Matthew. After running away from home, Matthew became a gangster and gathered together some teenage criminals to cause trouble for Marshville.
- Nathaniel Hunt – a Marshville civilian who is a known hunter.
- Patricia Lavery – the police captain of the Marshville Police Department.
- Professor Robert Cook – a member of the Canterbury Society of Paleontology. He is friends with Meriem and is fascinated with dinosaurs.
- Raymond Forrest – a former member of the Los Angeles Rams who is now a co-owner of an ice cream parlor in Marshville.
- Roberto Armstrong – a hermit living in Marshville.
- Timothy Higgins – the police sergeant of the Marshville Police Department.
- Will O'Brian – the coolest kid in Marshville, though does do something stupid occasionally.
- Zak Kabbit – Bruce Kabbit's younger brother who was the first victim of the dinosaurs after Marshville was transported back in time.

== Awards ==
- Cavewoman was awarded the Best Pen and Ink award by The Inkwell Awards (2010) at Heroes Con.
- Cavewoman: Jungle Tales was nominated for a 1999 Ignatz Award for Outstanding Story.

== Limited bibliography ==
=== Series ===
- Cavewoman #1–6 (Dec. 1993 – Jun. 1995)
- Cavewoman: Rain # 1–8 (1996–1997)
- Cavewoman: Missing Link #1–4 (1997–1998)
- Cavewoman: Jungle Tales #1–3 (1998-2005)
- Cavewoman: Pangaean Sea #1–11 (2000–2009)
- Cavewoman: Intervention #1–2 (2001)
- Cavewoman: Meriem's Gallery #1–4 (2001–2009)
- Cavewoman: Prehistoric Pinups #1–5 (2001–2010)
- Cavewoman: Cover Gallery #1–5 (2002–2013)
- Cavewoman: Raptor #1–2 (2002)
- Cavewoman: Reloaded # 1–6 (2005–2009) reprint of Cavewoman #1–6
- Cavewoman: Jungle Jam #1–2 (2006)
- The Cave Drawings of Budd Root #1–2 (2008–2010)
- Cavewoman: Hunt #1–2 (2010–2011)
- Cavewoman: Snow #1–4 (2011)
- Cavewoman: Feeding Grounds #1–2 (2012)
- Cavewoman: Mutation #1–2 (2012)
- Cavewoman: Natural Selection #1–2 (2012)
- Cavewoman: Gangster #1–3 (2012)
- Cavewoman: Oasis #1–2 (2013)
- Cavewoman: Journey #1–2 (2014)
- Cavewoman: The Zombie Situation #1–2 (2015)
- Cavewoman: The Return #1–4 (2015)
- Cavewoman: Shorts #1-2 (2015)
- Cavewoman: Sisters of the Arena #1-2 (2015-2016)
- Cavewoman: Raptorella #1-2 (2016)
- Cavewoman: Starship Blish #1-2 (2017)
- Cavewoman: Ankha's Revenge #1-3 (2016)
- Cavewoman: Battle Against Ankha's Brood #1-2 (2018)
- Cavewoman: Return To Labyrinth #1-2 (2018)

=== One-shot issues ===
- Cavewoman: Original Series vol. 1 (1996) reprint of Cavewoman #1–6
- Cavewoman Meets Explorers (1997)
- Cavewoman: Color Special (1999) reprint of Threshold #7 story
- Cavewoman: Odyssey #1 (1999)
- Cavewoman: Pangaean Sea Prologue (1999)
- Cavewoman: One-Shot Special (2000)
- Klyde & Meriem (2001)
- Basement/Amryl 2002 Convention Special Jam Book! (2002)
- Tanlines Pinup Book (2002)
- Cavewoman: He Said, She Said (2003)
- Cavewoman: The Movie (2003)
- Cavewoman: Beauties & Beasts (2005)
- Women: Selected Drawings & Illustrations (2006) vol. 02 – 'Book Two'
- Cavewoman & Fiends (2008)
- Cavewoman: Red Menace (2009)
- Budd's Sketchbook of Sketchbook Sketches (2010)
- Cavewoman: A Night Out (2010)
- Cavewoman: Extinction (2010)
- PUs By Budd (2011)
- Babes Fer 'Burgh-ers (2012) – 'The Pittsburgh Comicon'
- Cavewoman: Bunny Ranch (2012)
- Cavewoman: Uncovered (2013)
- Welcome to the Jungle! (2013)
- Cavewoman: The Many Faces of Meriem (2013)
- Cavewoman: Primal (2013)
- Cavewoman: Sea Monsters (2013)
- Cavewoman: Labyrinth (2013)
- Cavewoman: Deadly Venom (2014)
- Cavewoman: Killing Dinos 101 (2014)
- Cavewoman: 2014 20th Anniversary Show Book (2014)
- Cavewoman: Karnival (2014)
- Cavewoman: Fallen (2014)
- Cavewoman: Rising (2014)
- Cavewoman: Roam (2014)
- Cavewoman: Castaway (2015)
- Cavewoman: Killing Dinos 101 Summer Break (2015)
- Cavewoman: The River Styx (2016)
- Cavewoman: Freakin' Yetis (2016)
- Cavewoman: My Little Dino (2016)
- Cavewoman: Shattered Time (2016)
- Cavewoman: Trouble For Two (2016)
- Cavewoman: Destination Jungle (2017)
- Cavewoman: Pool Party (2018)

== See also ==
- Jungle girl
- Feral child
