= Luchaire Affair =

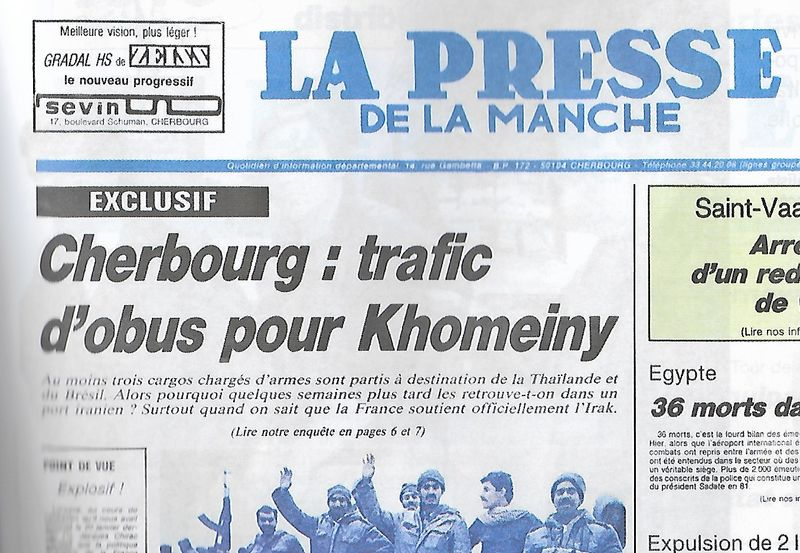
Front page of February 28, 1986 of the newspaper "La Presse de la Manche" triggering the Luchaire affair.

The Luchaire Affaire is a politico-financial scandal that took place in the 1980s in France, under the François Mitterrand presidency.

== Background ==
Between 1982 and 1986, while Charles Hernu was the French Minister of Defence, France supplied shells to Iran. This was revealed by the Presse de la Manche newspaper, and later by a Contrôle général des armées report published in L'Express in January 1987. Furthermore, 3 millions of francs in kickback might have given back to the French Socialist Party.

== The investigation ==
A formal investigation was initiated, with Judge Michel Legrand appointed to oversee it. However, Jean-François Barba retracted his allegations, and the judge was unable to access classified documents needed to continue the inquiry. Despite legal counsel advising against it, Prosecutor Pierre Bézard, acting under a direct written order from the French Ministry of Justice, issued an order for the case to be dismissed, which was officially carried out on June 16, 1989.

== Aftermath ==
Following these events, the first law on transparency of public life was enacted. This law established state funding for political parties and required certain public servants to disclose their financial status. Ultimately, it paved the way for the creation of the Haute Autorité pour la transparence de la vie publique in 2013. It ultimately led in 2013 to the creation of the Haute Autorité pour la transparence de la vie publique.
