= Budd Root =

American cartoonist

- Born: September 13, 1958 (age 68) Heidelberg, West Germany
- Areas: Artist, Writer
- Notable works: Cavewoman

Budd Root (born 1958) is an American cartoonist, and creator of the independent comic book Cavewoman, published by Root's company Basement Comics / Amryl Entertainment. Root is one of the premiere contemporary "good girl" artists, with an art style similar to Art Adams.'

== Biography ==
Root was born in Heidelberg, Germany, on a United States Army military base. Thanks to his grandfather, comics were a major influence during his youth. Joining the United States Marines, Root worked in supply, achieving the rank of corporal. During his time in the service, the Marine Corps' graphic arts department utilized his art skills for drawing tanks and airplanes for internal presentations.

In 1993, after leaving the Marines, Root attempted to get into the comics industry. After repeatedly being rejected by Marvel Comics and the mainstream companies, Root happened to meet author James Robert Smith at Smith's comic book store. Smith gave Root his first paid work, illustrating "James Gang" and "Johnny Thirteen" stories in James Gang #1, published by London Night Studios. The one issue of James Gang sold poorly; so poorly, in fact, that Root was paid in King Kong collectible cards from Smith's comic book store.

Nonetheless, that first taste of getting published proved irresistible to Root and he was hooked on comics. Pooling money with his wife Leslie, he formed Basement Comics and self-published the first issue of Cavewoman in 1993. The book has proven to be extremely successful, spanning many issues, specials, and one-shots; and has since gone on to be published by Caliber Press and Avatar Press, in addition to Basement Comics.

== Awards ==
Root's one-shot Cavewoman: Jungle Tales, was nominated for a 1999 Ignatz Award for Outstanding Story.
