= Basement Comics =

Independent comic book publisher from North Carolina, USA

- Industry: Comics
- Founded: 1993
- Founder: Budd Root
- Headquarters: North Carolina, U.S.
- Key people: Budd Root
- Website: BasementComics.com

Basement Comics is an independent comic book publisher owned by Budd Root. Basement Comics is best known for publishing the popular good-girl title Cavewoman (and all its associated specials, annuals, and one-shots). A division of Amryl Entertainment, Basement Comics is based in Mount Airy, North Carolina, and was founded in 1993.

In addition to Root, other creators affiliated with Basement Comics include Frank Cho, Devon Massey, Chad Spilker, James Robert Smith, Loston Wallace, and Dave Columbo.

== Titles ==
Cavewoman titles

- Cavewoman (1993)
- Cavewoman: Meets Explorers (1997)
- Cavewoman: Missing Link (1997)
- Jungle Tales of Cavewoman (1998)
- Cavewoman: Pangean Sea Prelude (1999)
- Cavewoman: Pangean Sea (2000)
- Cavewoman One-Shot Special (2000)
- Cavewoman: Intervention (2001)
- Cavewoman: Meriem's Gallery (2001)
- Klyde & Meriem (2001)
- Cavewoman: Prehistoric Pinups (2001)
- Cavewoman: Raptor (2002)
- Cavewoman: He Said, She Said (2003)
- Cavewoman: The Movie (2003)
- Cavewoman: Reloaded (2005)

Other titles

- Tigress (1998)
- Basement/Amryl Jam Book (2002)
- Savage Planet (2002)
- Budd's Beauties & Beasts (2005)
- Island of the Tiki Goddess (2007)
