= Dofus Arena =

2010 video game

- Developer: Ankama Games
- Platforms: Linux, Mac OS X, Windows
- Release: March 6, 2010
- Genre: MMORPG
- Mode: Multiplayer

Dofus Arena (also known as "Arena Confrontation") was a free turn-based strategic online game and was the second game of Ankama Games. It was a PvP (Player versus player) game based on the story of Dofus. Dofus Arena incarnates the essence of DOFUS's gameplay, featuring increasingly difficult tactical fights. As a coach, each player creates and manages their own unique team of characters, enabling him to face opponents of all kinds, in different elements.

The game was closed in October, 2014.

== Gameplay ==
=== Team creation ===
Every player makes a team of which the sum of the value of every fighter, spell, equipment and penalty does not exceed 6000 kama. Teams compose of 2 to 6 fighters, with the average being 4-5.

=== Classes ===
There are 12 classes, all of them a form of human, each with 10 spells available to them. Spells serve mainly to deal damage, but there are also plenty of spells that change stats (either positive or negative), debuff, heal, throw, change place, push, attract, summon or globally affect the game.

- Feca's Shield, Fecas have a human appearance and form the defensive spellcaster class. They are seen as defensive supporters and/or resistant tanks - with spells involving increasing ally resistance to attacks and laying a variety of (spell) glyphs which AoE damage or effects. Weapon speciality: staffs
- Osamodas's Whip, Osamodas are the summoner classes and have a human appearance with horns and a tail. They are able to summon various AI monsters to fight alongside them - however the AI of these monsters deter many from selecting this class. They also share many cleric-type spells making them a secondary healer. Due to their many summons, they are balanced supporters with a weapon speciality in hammers.
- Enutrof's Fingers, Enutrofs are depicted as elderly humans and are known as the treasure hunter class - around which their spells and abilities revolve. Enutrofs have a higher probability of obtaining rare drops when fighting against monsters in Dofus. They are seen as the multi-purpose ranged supporter class and are the only class with a weapon speciality in shovels.
- Sram's Shadow, Srams form the assassin/thief character class in Dofus with their appearance differing depending on the gender of the character. Their playing style is said to be more tactical than the other classes - being the only class that lay a variety of hidden traps on the ground and can render themselves invisible to get into close range. As a result, they are evasive close combat attacker with unique weapon speciality in daggers.
- Xelor's Sandglass , Xelors are the specialist denial and crowd control class with their spells focused upon restricting the moves of opponents. However they do have a number of ranged attacks and are therefore seen as the evasive ranged attacker. They have a mummy-like appearance and a weapon speciality in hammers.
- Ecaflip's Coin, Ecaflips have a cat-like appearance and are the gambler class - with their main theme being chance or luck. They have attacks and buffs that can be either beneficial or harmful and are seen as the versatile attacker. Weapon speciality: swords.
- Eniripsa's Hands, Eniripsas have a fairy / pixie appearance that differ depending on the gender of the character. They are the healer or clerics of Dofus with a range of healing and buff spells. They are also the only class with a weapon speciality in wands.
- Iop's Heart, Iops form the warrior/paladin high-damage-dealing class. They have an elf-like appearance but with no pupil in their eyes. They are the specialist class in Dofus for close combat attackers. Weapon speciality: swords.
- Cra's Range, Cras are the elf-like archer class in Dofus making them a specialist long ranged attacker. Many of their spells are linked to the bow and range. Unsurprisingly, they are the only class with a weapon speciality in bows, but maybe some will use daggers.
- Sadida's Boots, A race of tree people that are the invoker class and offensive ranged attacker. Their spells orient around nature and various voodoo dolls - therefore acting as a secondary summoner in Dofus. They also have a handful of AoE spells and crowd control measures making them a versatile offensive ranged attacker. Weapon speciality: staffs.
- Sacrier's Blood, Sacriers Berserkers and the primary tanks in Dofus. Their spells concentrate around receiving damage to do damage & protecting allies in a tanking role. Their appearance is similar to that of zombies. They are the only class that does not have a weapon speciality.
- Pandawa's Pint, As their names suggest, they have a panda-like appearance. Their spells are focus upon making an opponent weaker to attacks and two different states reliant on drinking alcohol. With their wide variety of spells, they are seen as the multi-purpose balanced close combat fighter. They are the only class with a speciality in Axes.

=== Equipment ===
The player can equip fighters with weapons, pets, cloaks, hats and/or dofuses. Weapons serve as a second way to deal damage - besides spells - and change Initiative. The other kinds of equipments change one or more of the following stats: Max Health (HP), Action Points (AP), Movement Points (MP), range, dodge & blocking, resistance, damage multiplier and reflecting.

There are 8 equipments kinds: weapons, the familiar ones, rings, amulets, boots, capes, hats and Dofus. Each character can carry only one equipment of each category. All the categories of equipment bring no-claims bonus to the carrier. The weapons have however a role particular to Dofus Arena (in addition to that to strike) because they make it possible to regulate the initiative of the characters.

=== Particularity ===
The game does not contain any experience system that could affect the team: Ankama Games did not want to give advantages to players with more time. As a result, the newest player can make exact the same team as the best player of the game.

It is not possible to get a successful team by throwing random elements together. Rather, the teams used by high level players focus on maximum synergy between spells, equipment and characters. There is no "best" team and teams that focus on one part of the equipment spectrum (i.e. summons) are equal to more balanced teams.

=== Fight ===
Currently two forms of combat are available, 1vs1 and 2vs2. In these modes, team(s) battle against each other in one of the 18 maps. The game promotes planning and using different spells in succession (often called a combo).

The turn order is determined by the initiative of each fighter. This stat depends on the class and can be altered with equipment. The order goes from the fighter with the highest amount of initiative to the one with the least initiative.

The game futures a side/back system where damage is increased by 20% when attacking from the side and 40% when attacking from the back.

To reduce repetition, there are two elements randomly chosen at the start of the game: bonus cards and event cards. Bonus cards are strong actions that can be activated by everybody, but can only be used once per team. Event cards are cards that affect the game and change every round, this ranges from "everybody deals 10% more wind damage" or "all sacriers (a class) gain 2 MP and do 10% more damage" to "everybody loses 1 AP".

==== Coach management ====
The majority of the fights are ladder based and grant the winner "coach items"- that serve solely for appearance, those items do not affect combat – and points, calculated by the Elo rating system. If the player has have enough points, they gain a level.

The ladder ranks everybody by their points gathered.

All stats are recorded and the replay of every single match is available.

== Reception ==
- "Price of the Public" at the Flash festival in France in 2006.

== Closure ==
Despite all the work on it and a beta test period that lasted nearly a decade, the game was never officially released. Development was officially "paused" in February 2012, and the lead developer left in July 2012. The game remained unfinished but playable for quite a while, until the Dofus Arena website was quietly closed without notice on October 14, 2014 and the game servers shut down.
