= Retz, Virginia =

Unincorporated community in Virginia, US

Coordinates: 37°25′44″N 76°21′13″W

Retz is an unincorporated community in Mathews County, in the U. S. state of Virginia.
