= Ankama =

French entertainment company

- Type: SAS
- Industry: Entertainment
- Founded: May 15, 2001; 25 years ago
- Headquarters: 75 boulevard d'Armentières, 59100 Roubaix Cedex 1 – France
- Key people: Camille Chafer; (lead programmer, co-founder); Anthony Roux; (art director, co-founder); Emmanuel Darras; (sales manager, co-founder)
- Number of employees: 500 (2012)
- Divisions: Ankama Games; Ankama Web; Ankama Éditions; Ankama Animations
- Website: ankama.com/en

Ankama is a French entertainment company headquartered in Roubaix, France, focused on the design of massive multiplayer online role playing games (Dofus, Dofus Arena and Wakfu). The company is also active in publishing, animation and Web development. It was founded by Anthony Roux, Camille Chafer and Emmanuel Darras. The company name comes from their own names : ANthony, KAmille, MAnu.

== Video games ==
Ankama Games create, produce and distribute their own video games:

- Dofus, the first game by the studio, is an MMORPG developed entirely in Flash. Players control an Avatar in the medieval fantasy "World of Twelve". aiming to acquire experience by completing quests and defeating monsters. The game uses a unique, turn based tactical combat system, which sets Dofus apart from many other MMORPGs. The basic version of the game is free-to-play, but more features are available to player purchasing a subscription.
- Dofus Arena, which public beta-testing began in early 2006, is the PvP (Player versus player) version of Dofus. The players take on the role of a coach setting up a team to compete with the teams of other players. Dofus Arena takes its combat system from Dofus. The goal of the game is to go up a relative ranking of players, which is based on the Elo rating system.
- Voya Nui Online Game, the only known game developed by Ankama to be used by another company (the aforementioned Lego Group), is a one-player RPG that could be played from Lego's website in 2006.
- Islands of Wakfu, an action-adventure role-playing game for the Xbox 360 Xbox Live Arcade published by Microsoft Games Studios, set in the universe of Wakfu. Released in 2011.
- Wakfu, an MMORPG developed in 2011. It allows players to interact without any NPC interference. The game takes place in the same world as Dofus, but is set 1000 years later.
- Fly'n, is a puzzle platformer released on 9 November 2012.
- Tactile Wars is a multi-player video game released in 2015.
- King Tongue is a single player phone app released in 2015.
- Kwaan, an MMORPG released in 2016. Servers were shut down and the game delisted from Steam on December 1, 2017.
- Drag'n'Boom
- Nindash
- Krosmaster
- Krosmaga
- Waven, a free-to-play multiplayer tactical RPG, for mobile devices, PC and Mac. Available in early access since August 2023.

== Comic book publishing ==
Ankama Éditions was set up in 2006 to publish comic books. The published works include titles related to Ankama Games' Dofus universe, but also unrelated titles such as Mutafukaz, which is very successful in France. Published works include:

- Artbooks Dofus
- Dofus (manga)
- Original SoundTrack Dofus
- Mutafukaz comic book (bd)
- Dofus Pandala comic book (bd)
- Dofus Arena (manga)
- Maliki (comic book), (bd)
- Dofus Monster (manga)
- Kuma-kuma (manga)
- Chaosland comic book (bd)
- Artbook Café Salé
- Dofus Mag
- Debaser (manga)
- Freaks Squeele comic book (bd)
- Kanvict comic book (bd)
- Radiant (manga)

== Web ==
Ankama Web is an interactive communication agency specialized in digital media, Web development and marketing buzz strategies. Ankama Web thus develops websites and Internet applications for professionals. Created in 2001, the agency was historically the first pole of activity of Ankama. Ankama Web shut down in 2012.

== Press ==
Ankama Presse, dedicated to the publication of magazines, was created on June 15, 2007, as a part of Ankama's cross-media strategy. It published mainly magazines about Ankama's video games. Its main product was Dofus Mag, focused on Ankama's flagship game, Dofus. The magazine's format was inspired by the Japanese concept of mook, indicating a hybrid product between magazine and book: while being distributed in newsstands, it was meant to be read and preserved as a book. Dofus Mag and other Ankama Presse titles were subsequently canceled.

== Animation ==
Anthony Roux founded Ankama Animations in March 2007.

In 2008, Wakfu: The Animated Series (based on the video game, Wakfu) began airing. A second season aired in 2011, followed by a third in 2017 and a fourth in 2024. All four seasons consisted of 20-minute episodes, for a total of 78 episodes across all four seasons. The plot focuses on Yugo and his companions as he is looking for his biological family. The series is animated in Adobe Flash.

In 2013, Dofus: The Treasures of Kerubim, based upon the Dofus game, aired. The series is set 200 years before the beginning of the MMORPG. It follows the main character Kerubim throughout various episodes of his life. The premise has Kerubim narrating several of his adventures to his adopted son Joris and their housekeeper Simone. The series consists of 52 10-minute episodes. A movie adaptation of the TV series was released in late 2015.

In 2016, the film Dofus, livre 1 : Julith (Anthony Roux, Jean-Jacques Denis) was released in French theaters.

In October 2017, Ankama Animations colloaborated with Ellipsanime Productions, the Paris-based French animation oroduction subsidiary owned by Média-Participations via French publishing arm Dargaud, to establish a joint venture 2D animation production studio based in Roubaix, Hauts-de-France named MadLab Animations to handle the two animation studios' own production services alongside Média-Participations' fellow main Paris and Angoulême-based animation production studio Ellipse Studio for the latter.

In 2018, the film Mutafukaz (Guillaume Renard, Shōjirō Nishimi) was released in French theaters. On December 25, 2019, it was released on Netflix in the US market.

In 2026 Ankama licensed the anime series Welsh & Shedar worldwide to be released on their Krosmoz YouTube channel in early November 2026.

== Development strategy ==
=== Internationally ===
Ankama developed internationally from the 2000s with two subsidiaries in the United States and Japan, and expanded with the arrival of Olivier Comte as general manager and the creation of many other studios.

Ankama Studio is a subsidiary of Ankama, created in 2006, which produces games for other companies, particularly in North America. The Ankama Japan studio, based in Tokyo, opened in early 2009. It mainly deals with animation.

Based in Montreal, the Ankama Canada studio was created on August 1, 2013, by two Ankama employees. The group, made up of ten employees, is the author of the video game Abraca. To enable (among other things) the expansion of the Wakfu game in China, the company opened a studio in Singapore in early 2014. These two studios, as well as another in São Paulo in Brazil, will close quickly, to allow Ankama to focus on Japan and Paris.

The Ankama Asia group, based in Manila in the Philippines, and aiming to develop its games in the Asian world, was acquired on March 22, 2016, by Keywords Studios. During this four-year contract, Keywords wishes to recruit about twenty more employees.

In 2018, Studio No Border was created, a Tokyo subsidiary responsible for the development of Japanese animations and video games. Thomas Romain, known for his Code Lyoko series, is the artistic director.

In 2019, Ankama reached the twelfth rank of the most profitable French companies.
