= Publihebdos =

French media group specializing in local weekly newspapers

Groupe actu
- Formerly: Publihebdos
- Type: Société par actions simplifiée
- Industry: Publishing of magazines and periodicals
- Founded: July 8, 1999
- Headquarters: Rennes, France
- Key people: Laurent Gouhier (President of the executive board from September 1, 2024)
- Products: Actu.fr
- Revenue: €92 million (2023)
- Number of employees: 850 (2023)
- Parent: Groupe SIPA - Ouest-France
- Website: www.publihebdos.com

Groupe actu (formerly Publihebdos) is a subsidiary of Groupe SIPA Ouest-France and specializes in the publication of local weekly newspapers.

== History ==
=== 1999–2017 ===
==== 1999–2001 ====
Publihebdos was established in 1999 with the objective of consolidating all of the weekly regional press titles owned by Ouest-France, which at that time included Le Trégor and Les Sables - Vendée Journal.

In 2001, through Publihebdos, Ouest-France acquired the family-owned Méaulle group, which was prominent in Normandy through approximately twenty titles, such as L'Éveil normand and Les Informations dieppoises... Publihebdos also took control of the printing plant in Bernay.

This acquisition enabled Groupe SIPA - Ouest-France to establish a presence in Upper Normandy, particularly to compete with the Hersant Media Group, which owned the rival newspaper Paris-Normandie.

==== 2002–2013 ====
In 2005, as part of the acquisition of Socpresse Ouest by Groupe SIPA-Ouest-France—which resulted in the creation of the subsidiary Les Journaux de Loire—Publihebdos acquired the weekly newspapers Toutes les nouvelles (Versailles) and La Gazette du Val-d'Oise, both previously owned by Serge Dassault.

In 2007, Publihebdos acquired 14 local weekly newspapers from the Hersant group in Normandy and the Pays de la Loire region, including titles such as Les Nouvelles de Falaise and Le Courrier vendéen. This transaction brought the total number of titles under Publihebdos to 56, representing nearly 30% of the French weekly press market.

Between 2009 and 2013, Publihebdos continued acquiring independent weekly newspapers, including L'Informateur and L'Écho-Le Régional in 2009, Le Courrier du Léon and Progrès de Cornouaille in 2010, the biweekly regional newspaper Le Pays briard in 2011, and Le Républicain (Lot-et-Garonne and South Gironde) in 2013.

In parallel with these acquisitions, the group launched new free weekly newspapers and digital-only publications, including Le Havre infos and Côté Caen in 2010, 76actu in 2012, and Normandie-actu.fr in 2014. By this point, the group comprised 76 weekly newspapers.

==== 2014–2016 ====
In 2014, Publihebdos acquired 70% of the weekly newspapers of La Presse Régionale, which was controlled by an association linked to the Mulliez family, with the remaining 30% initially retained by the association Les Amis de la presse régionale. This acquisition added 12 weekly titles, including Voix du Jura, Voix du Midi, and Croix du Nord, bringing the total to 80 titles out of approximately 250 weekly newspapers in France.

In 2016, the departmental daily newspaper La Presse de la Manche, which had been acquired by Ouest-France in 1990, was transferred to Publihebdos.

=== Since 2017 ===
Since 2017, Publihebdos has focused its strategy on digital development, consolidating its various websites under the single platform Actu.fr. This platform generated 50 million monthly visits in 2019 and reached 100 million monthly visits in 2023. On November 7, 2024, Publihebdos was renamed Groupe actu.

== Organization ==
=== Management ===
Until the end of August 2024, Francis Gaunand served as president of the executive board of Publihebdos, succeeding Bruno de Boursetty, who had in turn succeeded Martine Laruaz. Starting September 1, 2024, Laurent Gouhier became president of the executive board of Groupe actu (formerly Publihebdos).

=== Workforce ===
In 2023, the media group employed 850 people, approximately half of whom were journalists. This represented an increase of 100 employees compared to 2013. This growth was due to the acquisition of La Presse Régionale and the recruitment of around fifty journalists for the Actu.fr platform. In 2024, Groupe actu (formerly Publihebdos) had 847 employees, including 400 journalists.

=== Circulation ===
In 2013, the group's 76 titles had a combined circulation of 841,000 copies (740,000 copies for 75 titles in 2011). In 2020, amid rising raw material costs caused by the COVID-19 pandemic and the Russian invasion of Ukraine, circulation remained stable at 800,000 copies for 88 titles.

=== Publications ===
==== Brittany ====
- La Chronique Républicaine (Fougères),
- Le Courrier Indépendant (Loudéac),
- L'Écho de l'Armor et de l'Argoat (Guingamp),
- La Gazette du Centre Morbihan (Locminé),
- Le Pays Malouin (Saint-Malo),
- Le Penthièvre (Langueux),
- Le Petit Bleu des Côtes d'Armor (Dinan),
- Le Ploërmelais (Ploërmel),
- Pontivy Journal (Pontivy),
- La Presse d'Armor (Paimpol),
- Le Trégor (Lannion)
- Le Journal de Vitré (Vitré),
- Côté Brest (Brest)
- Côté Quimper (Quimper)
- L' Hebdo du Finistère (Quimper)

==== Normandy ====
===== Seine-Maritime =====
- Le Bulletin (Darnétal),
- Le Havre Infos (Le Havre),
- Le Journal d'Elbeuf (Elbeuf)
- La Dépêche du Pays de Bray (Forges-les-Eaux),
- Les Informations dieppoises (Dieppe)
- L'Informateur (Eu), bought in 2009 from the Royer family
- L'Éclaireur Brayon (Gournay-en-Bray),
- Le Réveil de Neufchâtel (Neufchâtel-en-Bray).
- Côté Rouen (Rouen), released in February 2nd, 2011

===== Eure =====
- Le Démocrate vernonnais (Vernon),
- Eure Infos (Évreux),
- L'Éveil de Pont-Audemer (Pont-Audemer),
- L'Éveil normand (Bernay),
- La Dépêche (Évreux - Louviers - Verneuil-sur-Avre)
- Le Courrier de l'Eure (Le Neubourg)
- L'Impartial (Les Andelys),

===== Calvados =====
- L'Éveil de Lisieux-Côte (Lisieux),
- Liberté - Le Bonhomme libre (Caen),
- Les Nouvelles de Falaise (Falaise)
- La Voix - Le Bocage (Vire)
- La Renaissance le Bessin (Bayeux)
- Le Pays d'Auge (Lisieux)
- Côté Caen (Caen), released in December 8th, 2010

===== Manche =====
- La Presse de la Manche (Cherbourg-en-Cotentin),
- La Gazette de la Manche (Saint-Hilaire-du-Harcouët),
- Côté Manche (Saint-Lô), released in May 11, 2011
- C'est à Cherbourg (Cherbourg-en-Cotentin)

===== Orne =====
- Le Journal de l'Orne (Argentan),
- L'Orne Hebdo (Alençon)
- Le Perche (Mortagne-au-Perche),
- Le Réveil normand (L'Aigle),
- Le Publicateur libre (Domfront)
- L'Orne combattante (Flers)

==== Pays de la Loire ====
- Les Alpes Mancelles (Sillé-le-Guillaume)
- L'Hebdo de Sèvre & Maine (Clisson)
- Les Nouvelles (Sablé)
- Les Sables Vendée-Journal (Les Sables-d'Olonne)
- L'Éclaireur (Châteaubriant)
- Le Courrier du pays de Retz (Pornic)
- Le Courrier vendéen (Challans)
- L'Écho de la Presqu'île (Guérande)
- Le Petit Courrier - L'Écho de la Vallée du Loir, bought in 2010
- L'Écho de la vallée du Loir (La Chartre-sur-le-Loir), bought in June 2011
- Côté La Flèche
- Côté La Roche sur Yon
- Côté Les Herbiers
- Mayenne Infos
- L'Action - L'Echo
- Actu Le Mans
- Le Journal du Pays Yvonnais

==== Île-de-France ====
- Le Courrier de Mantes (Mantes-la-Jolie),
- Le Courrier des Yvelines (Saint-Germain-en-Laye),
- La Gazette du Val-d'Oise (Pontoise), bought in 2005,
- La République de Seine-et-Marne (Melun),
- Toutes les nouvelles (Versailles), bought in 2005.
- La Marne (Meaux), bought in 2007.
- L'Écho-Le Régional (Pontoise), bought in February 2008
- Le Pays Briard (Coulommiers), bought in late 2010.

==== Nouvelle-Aquitaine ====
- Le Républicain (Lot-et-Garonne and Southern Gironde), bought in December 2012

==== Auvergne-Rhône-Alpes ====
- La Voix du Cantal

==== Centre-Val-de-Loire ====
- L'Action - L'Echo (Nogent-le-Rotrou)

==== Hauts-de-France ====
- Croix du Nord,
- L'Éclaireur (Gamaches),
- Le Journal d'Abbeville (Abbeville).

==== Occitanie ====
- Côté Toulouse
- Voix du Midi (Toulouse - Lauragais)
- La Vie Quercynoise

==== Bourgogne-Franche-Comté (Jura) ====
- Voix du Jura (Lons-le-Saunier).

=== Printing facilities ===
Groupe actu operates two printing plants: one in Cavan in the Côtes-d'Armor department and another in Cherbourg in Normandy. Both facilities are certified under the Imprim'Vert environmental label. The printing plant in Bernay, also located in Normandy, was closed in 2018.

== Economic model ==
In 2013, the group's revenue was €78 million, of which 48% came from newspaper sales and the remaining 52% from advertising, classified advertisements, and legal notices. In 2023, the group reported revenue of €92 million, with a profitability rate of 10%.

In 2022, an independent report commissioned by the works council of Publihebdos criticized the group's business model, describing it as "low-cost" journalism and highlighting poor working conditions.

=== Ownership ===
Groupe actu is a subsidiary of Groupe SIPA - Ouest-France. It is owned through SIPA (Société d'investissements et de participations), which holds 84.34% of its capital. SIPA itself is controlled by the Association pour le soutien des principes de la démocratie humaniste. The group also owns the news agency APEi.

== Bibliography ==
=== Theses ===
- Anciaux, Arnaud (2014). Réinventer l'économie du journalisme. Ouest-France et Québecor, deux essais de transformation d'une pratique discursive et des modèles d'affaires des industries médiatiques à l'ère du numérique [Reinventing the economics of journalism. Ouest-France and Quebecor: two attempts to transform discursive practices and business models in the media industry in the digital age] (Thesis) (in French). Université de Rennes 1 – Université Laval. p. 507.

=== Academic articles ===
- Rouger, Aude (2005). "Entre presse nationale parisienne et journaux locaux de province : la presse régionale en Île-de-France" [Between the national press in Paris and local newspapers in the provinces: the regional press in Île-de-France]. Le Temps des médias (in French). 5 (2): 177–188. doi:10.3917/tdm.005.0177.
- Ballarini, Loïc (2008). "Presse locale, un média de diversion" [Local press, a medium for entertainment]. Réseaux (in French). 148–149 (2–3): 405–426.
- Frisque, Cégolène (2010). "Des espaces médiatiques et politiques locaux ?" [Local media and political spaces?]. Revue française de science politique (in French). 60 (5): 951–973. doi:10.3917/rfsp.605.0951.
- Tredan, Olivier; Gestin, Philippe (2023). "La presse locale sous l'influence des plateformes numériques : l'influence de Facebook sur la circulation de l'information locale" [Local media under the influence of digital platforms: Facebook's influence on the circulation of local information]. Études de communication (in French). 61 (2): 113–131. doi:10.4000/edc.16178.
- Texier, Jean-Clément (April 2023). "La PQR, ses territoires et ses modèles d'affaires" [Regional daily newspapers, their territories, and their business models]. La revue européenne des médias et du numérique (in French).

=== Books ===
- Charon, Jean-Marie (2013). La presse quotidienne [The daily press] (in French). Paris: Éditions La Découverte. p. 128.
- Bousquet, Franck; Amiel, Pauline (2021). La presse quotidienne régionale [Regional daily press] (in French). Paris: Éditions La Découverte. p. 128.

=== Parliamentary reports ===
- Commission d'enquête sénatoriale (March 2022). "À l'heure du numérique, la concentration des médias en question ?" [In the digital age, is media concentration an issue?] (in French). Sénat français.
