= Wakfu =

2012 video game

WAKFU
- Developer: Ankama Games
- Publisher: Ankama Games
- Engine: Java
- Platforms: Linux, macOS, Windows
- Release: February 29, 2012
- Genre: MMORPG
- Mode: Multiplayer

Wakfu is a tactical turn-based MMORPG developed by Ankama Games and released for Microsoft Windows, macOS, and Linux on 29 February 2012. The game takes place 1,000 years after Ankama's previous game, Dofus.

A spin-off game, Islands of Wakfu, was released on Xbox Live Arcade on 30 March 2011. An animated television series based on the game began airing while Wakfu was in development in France from 30 October 2008, marking twelve years later after the game. The series has also spawned various comics, a trading card game and a board game.

== Story ==
In the time of Dofus, twelve years before the animated series, an ogre named Ogrest managed to get all six Dofus eggs for the sake of someone he loved. However, she was interested only in the eggs, and Ogrest killed her in a fit of rage. Later realizing what he'd done, he climbed atop Mount Zinit and cried for 1,000 years. This brings us to the time of WAKFU. Now the "goal" is to defeat Ogrest, but, like in Dofus, this is not necessary.

The timeline has moved thus far that the Ogrest is no longer the main villain of the story. It appears that it was not the Ogrest who caused this world to flood, but the Eliotrope OROPO. In the battle between Ogrest versus Yugo (who only appears in the animated series), Yugo gained control over the six Eliatrope Dofus and created alternate versions of himself, and then sent them back into the past. This also explains the appearance of the Eliotrope class in the game.

== Gameplay ==
Wakfu features a turn-based combat system similar to Dofus, it also contains elements inspired by tactical RPG. Players walk around with the screen scrolling while they move, as opposed to Dofus where the camera is static and characters move to a new area by walking to the edge of the current screen. Some parts of the game are player-managed: Governmental affairs such as organising militias or elections for positions like governor are performed by players themselves. Another similar addition is environmental management by players. Players can maintain resource levels by planting seeds as they harvest crops and hunt wildlife or simply take what they want, decreasing availability for other players, If players manage to maintain this they will earn various Nation bonuses. Since 2014 a new feature came to the World of Twelve, The Riktus Clan. The Riktus Clan nation was meant to be a criminal Nation, getting Nation bonuses by destroying the ecosystems of other nations. There are 18 classes, each one featuring 25 abilities (and 3 abilities which can be obtained by doing a quest). Each class has three types of elemental spells (out of four possible elements) with 5 spells per type, one category of 5 special actions specific to the class, and one category of 5 abilities that passively improve the character's other capabilities, since a short period, new elements were released but only for specific classes, such as Stasis or the Light element. Contrary to typical RPGs which present characters with new, more powerful abilities throughout the course of the game, Wakfu grants characters all their spells by the early stages and thereafter allows players to strengthen them. Wakfu features the same classes as Dofus, although many have different appearances or roles. As in Dofus, Wakfu features professions which characters may learn. Harvesting professions let characters "collect resources or basic materials from the fauna and flora". Crafting professions "allow you to transform these basic ingredients into ... equipment, accessories or even potions." The most famous monsters from Dofus, such as Tofus, Moskitos and Gobballs are present in Wakfu, although they have been redesigned with the addition of subclasses. The graphic designers at Ankama Games have also developed new creatures, like Phorreurs and Grave-diggers; Smares (monsters that look like a samara (fruit)) have been included.

== Development and release ==
Ankama Games began development in 2006. In October 2011, Eurogamer revealed the game to launch in February 2012. Square Enix published the game in North America until 15 January 2013, when Ankama assumed the role.

== Animated series ==
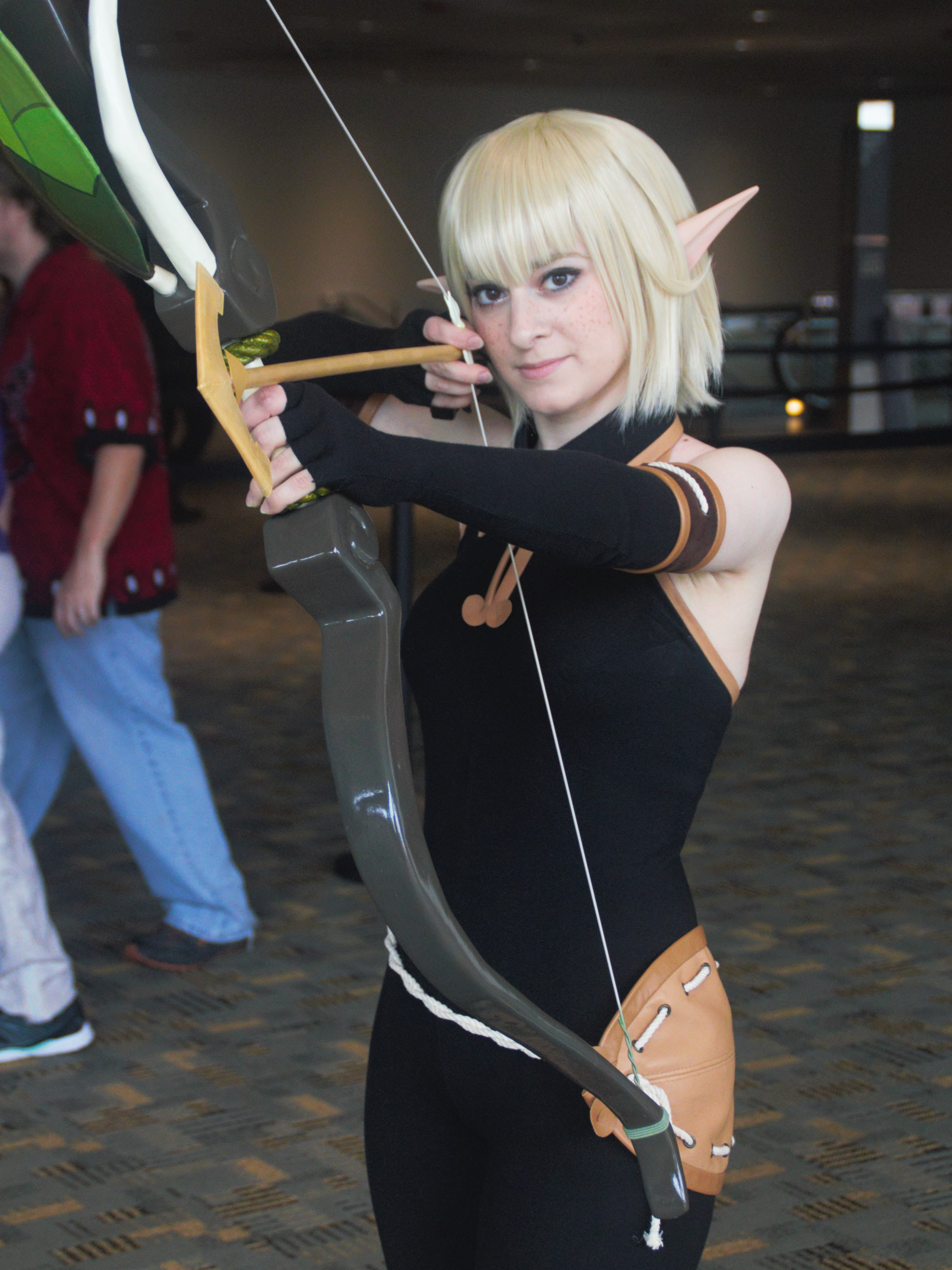
Cosplay of Evangelyne

Wakfu is predated by the TV series of the same name by Ankama Animation, with the first season of 26 episodes beginning airing on 30 October 2008. New episodes continued to air through June 2010 on France 3. The show was animated with Adobe Flash software; with all production done in France except episode 22 "Rubilax" and the special episode "Noximilien", both produced in Japan. The series is directed by Anthony "Tot" Roux, and character design is directed by Xavier "Xa" Houssin and Kim "Tcho" Etinoff. During the 2009 London MCM Expo, the first two episodes were shown for the first time in English, and a Kickstarter campaign was launched to fund the translation of the full first season.
