= Dofus =

2004 video game

- Developer: Ankama Games
- Designer: Mathieu Bourgain
- Platforms: Flash, Microsoft Windows, macOS, Linux
- Release: FR: September 2004; EN: October 2005
- Genre: Massively multiplayer online role-playing game
- Mode: Multiplayer

Dofus is a tactical turn-based massively multiplayer online role-playing game (MMORPG) developed and published by French game development studio Ankama Games. Originally released only in French, it has since been translated into many other languages. The game includes both pay-to-play accounts offering the full experience and free-to-play accounts offering a more limited amount of content. Its success has led to the marketing of spin-off products, such as books, art, comics and a movie released in 2016. It has also led to the development of two continuations: Dofus Arena, released at the beginning of 2006, which is an alternative "tournament" version of Dofus; and Wakfu, a sequel to Dofus. The game has attracted over 40 million players worldwide and is especially well known in France.

== Plot ==
=== Context ===
Dofus takes place in the World of Twelve, a High fantasy universe. Players must find the six primordial Dofus, dragon eggs that confer great power on their bearer, which are scattered across the world. The game features an open world that allows for a high level of player autonomy. Players can choose to engage in Player versus player combat, Player versus environment combat, or participate in the game's economy by obtaining and/or trading in-game items.

=== Universe ===
Dofus is the first Ankama product to take place in the transmedia world of the Krosmoz. From this first success will appear many derivative products, including two other video games, Arena in 2011 then Wakfu the following year, a television show (Wakfu, Dofus: Aux trésors de Kerubim) and a movie (Dofus, book 1: Julith).

The first derivative work is the manfra Dofus, the first volume of which was released on October 10, 2005. It is written by Tot, co-creator of the game, and drawn by Ancestral Z.

== Gameplay ==
Dofus takes place in "The World of Twelve", named for the 12 gods that inhabit it. Players control a 2D avatar belonging to one of 19 character classes in a third-person view. Each class has a unique set of spells that other classes can not obtain. As with most other massively multiplayer online role-playing games, players gain levels by obtaining experience. Experience can be gained by defeating monsters and completing quests. With each level, players gain points that can be used to improve their avatar's characteristics and spells. Players can access new spells and equipment by advancing in level. Players receive a special 'aura' when they reach level 100, and gain a different aura at 200, the maximum level. Players may also decide to take up professions and frequently band together to undertake dungeons. Many also become part of guilds, to more easily coordinate with others. Players complete quests to gain experience and other rewards.

While the game takes place in real-time, combat in Dofus is conducted more like a turn based strategy game – where each player takes it in turns to make a series of moves and attacks within a time limit. As such, when a player attacks monsters – they are transported to a 'copy map' where the fighting takes place. Once a fight begins, no other players may join that fight. Players use a series of spells (which are unique to that character class) to, amongst other effects, attack, heal, buff or drain one's Action Points (AP) or Movement Points (MP). All actions done in combat (by both players and monsters) consumes an amount of AP and all movement consumes MP. In combat if a character loses all of their health points (HP) they're rendered dead.

Characters in Dofus can learn various professions. There is a special type of profession called a specialization which can enhance item stats. Collecting professions involve players going out into the wilderness and collecting natural resources, such as certain wood and flowers. These can be made into breads and the like that restore health. They may also be sold as many of them are needed as quests items. Crafting professions involve the player piecing collected resources together to make a vast array of different items. Players gain experience in each profession by gathering the resources of that profession and/or by crafting items, depending on the type. As a player's collecting profession gains levels, they can collect new types of resources and obtain resources quickly. When a crafting profession levels, the player can create more powerful items and create them with a higher success rate, meaning that crafting will fail less often.

The currency used in Dofus is called "Kamas" (k). There are three cities that contain a marketplace where people can buy and sell goods and equipment for a fee. The kamas from these sales deposit directly into the player's bank account. Accounts are separated into two categories, Free-to-Play and Pay-to-Play. The game includes a zone accessible to Free-to-Play accounts. Free accounts have access to the new player zone of Incarnam and access to the city of Astrub and most of its outlying areas. This makes it possible for a new player to enjoy seemingly full game play, unbounded by time restrictions. Access to the entire world of Dofus—including access to other cities, participating in factional Player vs. Player battles and being able to raise profession levels above 30—requires a monthly fee, with discounts given for longer term subscriptions.

== Classes ==
- Feca's Shield, Fecas have a human-like appearance and form the defensive spellcaster class. They are seen as defensive supporters and/or resistant tanks - with spells involving increasing ally resistance to attacks and laying a variety of (spell) glyphs which AoE damage or effects. Weapon speciality: staffs.
- Osamodas's Whip, Osamodas are the summoner classes and have an imp appearance with horns and a tail. They are able to summon various AI monsters to fight alongside them - however the AI of these monsters deter many from selecting this class. They also share many cleric-type spells making them a secondary healer. Due to their many summons, they are balanced supporters with a weapon speciality in hammers.
- Enutrof's Fingers, Enutrofs are depicted as elderly humanoids and are known as the treasure hunter class - around which their spells and abilities revolve. Enutrofs have a higher probability of obtaining rare drops when fighting against monsters in Dofus. They are seen as the multi-purpose ranged supporter class and are the only class with a weapon speciality in shovels.
- Sram's Shadow, Srams are a skeleton assassin/thief character class in Dofus with their appearance differing depending on the gender of the character. Their playing style is said to be more tactical than the other classes - being the only class that lay a variety of hidden traps on the ground and can render themselves invisible to get into close range. As a result, they are evasive close combat attacker with a unique weapon speciality in daggers.
- Xelor's Sandglass, Xelors are the specialist denial and crowd control class with their spells focused upon restricting the moves of opponents. However, they do have a number of ranged attacks and are therefore seen as the evasive ranged attacker. They have a mummy-like appearance with robotic features and a weapon speciality in hammers.
- Ecaflip's Coin, Ecaflips have a cat-like appearance and are the gambler class - with their main theme being chance or luck. They have attacks and buffs that can be either beneficial or harmful and are seen as the versatile attacker. Weapon speciality: swords.
- Ouginak's Rage, they are heavy hitting barbarians of fury with a dog-like appearance, their special ability is Bow Wow.
- Eliotrope's Portal, An offshoot to the Eliatropes from Wakfu Eliotropes have the ability use Portal magic and cast spells through their portals for added damage, with further distances between portals resulting in greater damage
- Eniripsa's Hands, Eniripsas have a fairy appearance that differs depending on the gender of the character. They are the healer or clerics of Dofus with a range of healing and buff spells. They are also the only class with a weapon speciality in wands.
- Iop's Heart, Iops form the warrior/paladin high-damage-dealing class. They have a noseless appearance but with no pupils in their eyes. They are the specialist class in Dofus for close combat attackers. Weapon speciality: swords.
- Cra's Range, Cras are the elf-like archer class in Dofus making them a specialist long ranged attacker. Many of their spells are linked to the bow and range. Unsurprisingly, they are the only class with a weapon speciality in bows, but maybe some will use daggers.
- Huppermage's Rune, Huppermages the elemental mages in Dofus They are able to combine Fire, Air, Water, and Earth to cast spells with multiple effects
- Sadida's Boots, A race of tree people that are the invoker class and offensive ranged attacker. Their spells orient around nature and various voodoo dolls tile offensive ranged attacker. Weapon speciality: staffs.
- Foggernaut's Steam, Technomage Tactitions Foggernauts are able to summon various AI turrets that each perform different functions including Damage, Healing, and Positioning.
- Rogue's Ruse, Rogues are experts in Explosives they are able to summon bombs, use spells that can make them more powerful as well as move them, and can line up their bombs to create bomb walls
- Masqueraider's Mystique, as their name suggests, they wear masks, those masks help vary their combat and element style also giving them the ability to change the mask as they see fit.
- Sacrier's Blood, Sacriers Berserkers and the primary tanks in Dofus. Their spells concentrate around receiving damage to do damage & protecting allies in a tanking role. Their appearance is similar to that of zombies. They are the only class that does not have a weapon speciality. They're humanoids with pointed ears, orange hair and noseless male.
- Pandawa's Pint, As their names suggest, they have a panda-like appearance. Their spells are focus upon making an opponent weaker to attacks and two different states reliant on drinking "Bamboo Milk". With their wide variety of spells, they are seen as the multi-purpose balanced close combat fighter. They are the only class with a speciality in Axes.
- Forgelance's Heritage, Forgelances are the lancer class of Dofus. They are able to cast spells through their lance and they specialize in positioning and protection

== Development ==
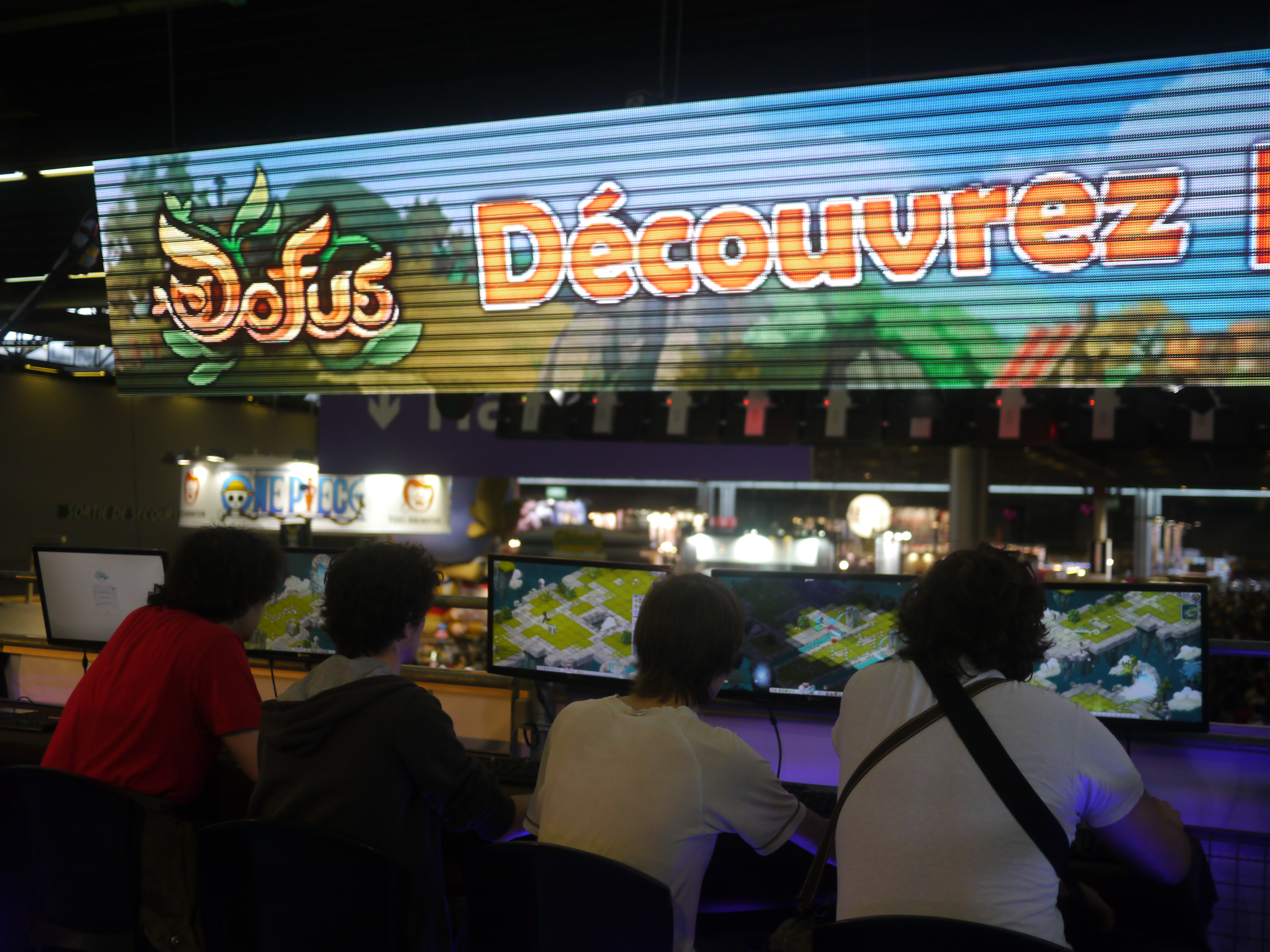
Dofus at Japan Expo 2013

=== Dofus 1 ===
Dofus began development in 2001 as the first title of Ankama games. The title was developed in Adobe Flash at their office in Roubaix by a small team, and ran from within a browser. 80,000 players were involved in the beta test, ahead of the French launch in 2004 and an international launch in September 2005. By 2007 Dofus had reached 3 million players, and by 2008, Dofus was the sixth most subscribed MMO in the world.

=== Dofus 2 ===
Dofus underwent a major overhaul in 2009, with the 2.0 update changing the graphics systems and netcode, as well as featuring a new soundtrack. The update retained the Flash platform. By 2010, Dofus had reached 30 million registered players, with around 3.5 million active subscribers at that time. Retro servers, which remained at version 1.29 of the game and were not supported with further updates, launched in 2016.

The player base peaked around the early 2010s and entered into a slow decline, leading to server mergers. Adobe Flash was discontinued at the end of 2020, after which the developers stated their intention to develop a new title using the Unity engine rather than port the existing game to another format. By 2021, the declining player base led the heroic mode servers to close, and declining player numbers caused a series of additional server mergers in 2022. The nineteen international (non-French language) servers were merged into four, and finally into a single server in October 2022. A quest to reunite the six primordial Dofus, the end of the core story of the game, was added in a May 2023 update.

=== Dofus 3 ===
Dofus 3.0, also known as Dofus Unity, marks a significant evolution in the Dofus MMORPG series by transitioning to the Unity engine. After an extensive development period, the game was officially released on December 3, 2024. Prior to the official launch, a beta phase commenced on August 13, 2024, allowing players to experience and provide feedback on the new features and improvements.

The shift to the Unity engine aimed to enhance the game's performance, graphics, and cross-platform compatibility, providing a more immersive and accessible experience for both new and returning players, but mostly it aims to stabilize development. According to the developers, continuing development on Flash had become increasingly difficult.

== Critical reception ==
Reception

Aggregate scores
| Aggregator | Score |
|---|---|
| GameRankings | 74% |
| Metacritic | 74/100 |

The game received "positive" reviews, according to video game review aggregator platform Metacritic. Dofus has also received international gaming awards including the Bytten Ernie Award for Best Graphics And Concept Art in 2007 and the Audience Award at the Independent Game Festival in 2006.

- Best game and Public Choice at the Flash festival in France in May 2004.
- Game of the month by the Edge Magazine in July 2005.
- Best game and Public Choice at Flashforward Film Festival of Seattle in February 2006.
- Public Choice at the Independent Games Festival (IGF) of San Jose in March 2006.

Following the release of Dofus 3.0, the game received the award for Best Game as a Service at the 2025 Pégases Awards.

== Animated series ==
In 2013 an animated series entitled Dofus aux trésors de Kérubim (English: Dofus: The Treasures of Kerubim) based upon the game began airing on France 3. The series is set 200 years before the beginning of the MMORPG and follows the character of Kerubim throughout various points in his life. The premise has Kerubim narrating several of his adventures to his adopted son Joris and their housekeeper Simone. Dofus consists of 52 episodes, each running 13 minutes apiece. The movie Dofus Book I: Julith was released on February 3, 2016. An English dub of the series debuted in the United States on VRV in November 2017. It was removed in late-2019.

=== Main characters ===
- Kerub Crepin - Kerub takes the leading role as head of the house, father figure, shop keeper and storyteller. Most episodes focus on stories of his past, and he often maintains the leading role in present-day episodes as well. Through his many stories, viewers get to know him as a child, a teenager and an adventurer in his prime. These different periods of heroism, conquest and bravado are contrasted by his current wisdom, melancholy and care for Joris. Having left many flaws in his past, he often delivers morals to Joris, but he still displays mischief and other traits that children may identify with.
- Joris - Joris, 7 years old, is the second focus of the series, a young boy whom the target audience can relate to with his mischief, disdain for chores and love of stories and (child-scale) adventures. He is always pressing his "Papycha" for more stories, asking about the various magic items in the shop, all of which were acquired through adventuring. He is very curious and obedient and clearly loves his adoptive father. His pet flea Flifli is often helpful in situations of need, frequently acting like a guard dog.
- Simone - Simone is an Osamodas maid that is hired by Kerub in the second episode, although her arrival is based on a misunderstanding. Although she plays a secondary role in most episodes, she becomes a member of the family after a fashion despite being aloof toward most people, with the notable exception of Joris, with whom she sometimes behaves like a nanny. She also befriends Luis quickly, which allows her to set both the house and the household straight. She develops a romantic relationship with a local Ecaflip hairdresser named Julie, but her sexual orientation is never treated as out of the ordinary or used to make a point. Despite working as a maid, she is fearsome in a fight and secretive about her past.
- Lou - Lou is the lifelong love interest of Kerub, and also a capable Ouginak adventurer in adulthood. Featuring in many episodes focused on the past, the Ouginak is sometimes seen as a prize, sometimes as a companion, and sometimes as a disgruntled lover to win back. Her strong temperament often clashes with Kerub's exuberant and carefree attitude, but his love for her is never diminished. She, on the other hand, seems to have left him for good and is never seen in the present day.
- Indie Delagrandaventure - The Ouginak Indie Delagrandaventure is Kerub's greatest rival. Similar in many ways, yet perfect opposites in others, they have spent their whole lives competing to determine who was the greatest adventurer. In their youth, they also competed for the love of Lou, but neither of them truly won that competition. Where Kerub relies heavily on luck and persuasion, Indie owes his success entirely to skill and discipline. He sees himself as a gentleman adventurer, refined and respectable, and Kerub as a "stray" merely playing at being a hero.

=== Supporting characters ===
- Luis - As the living house where current-day events take place, the Shushu Luis is mostly involved in conversation, but he also has control over various parts of the house and can use doors, among other things, to hinder or assist Kerub depending on his mood. One episode is dedicated to showing how Kerub and Lou came into "possession" of him.
- Ecaflip - As Kerub was raised in Ecaflip's temple and became his favorite disciple, the god Ecaflip makes several appearances throughout the series, influencing his luck, watching over him or placing challenges in his way.
- Julie - Julie is a local Ecaflip hairdresser. She is revealed to be a lesbian as she falls for Simone the minute she sees her during Episode 1. They develop a romantic relationship and are always seen together going on dates.
- Crocosec - Crocosec has an uncanny gift for disguise that is nothing short of unbelievable, which made him a valuable asset as part of Kerub's old crew. Unfortunately, he also feels uncontrollable urges to betray his allies at the worst times, but the others seem to accept his handicap rather gracefully.
- Kanigroo - Kanigroo is an expert tracker with a zen attitude, who never resorts to violence despite his impressive strength. His extraordinary sense of smell also allows him to detect lies.
- Tortue Brutale - This excitable member of Kerub's old crew has a fascination for explosives that needs to be kept in check by his friends, but his expertise on weaponry is equally valuable. He usually handles the more technical part of their operations.
- Bash Squale - Although he and Kerub used to be best friends, Bash has never forgiven Kerub for his perceived betrayal (episode 7). As he lives close by, Kerub often tries to be cordial with him, but his efforts seem wasted, to his chagrin.
