= Wakfu (TV series) =

French animated TV series

- Genre: Action; Fantasy; Comedy-drama; Adventure
- Created by: Anthony Roux
- Based on: Dofus
- Developed by: Ankama Animations; France Télévisions; Frakas Productions; Pictanovo
- Directed by: Anthony Roux; Fabrice Nzinzi
- Voices of: French cast: Fanny Bloc; Adeline Chetail; Thomas Guitard; Patrick Bethune; Geneviève Doang; Dorothée Pousseo; Jeremy Prevost; English cast: Jules de Jongh; Jessica Bell; Ross Grant; Keir Stewart; Hugo Chandor; Joanna Ruiz; Arthur Bostrom; Erika Harlacher; Christine Marie Cabanos; Kira Buckland; Kyle McCarley; Doug Erholtz; Keith Silverstein; Todd Haberkorn
- Theme music composer: Guillaume Houzé
- Composer: Guillaume Houzé
- Country of origin: France
- Original language: French
- No. of seasons: 4
- No. of episodes: 78 (+ 4 specials & 3 OVAs) (list of episodes)

Production
- Producers: Anthony Roux; Emanuel Darras
- Running time: 22-25 minutes
- Production companies: Ankama; France Télévisions; Frakas Productions; Pictanovo

Original release
- Network: France 3 France 4
- Release: October 30, 2008 – present

Wakfu: The Animated Series, or simply Wakfu, is a French animated television series produced by Ankama Animation, based on the video game Dofus. The first season of 26 episodes began airing on 30 October 2008, and new episodes would continue to air into January 2010 on France 3. The series is directed by Anthony "Tot" Roux, and character design is handled by Xavier "Xa" Houssin and Kim "Tcho" Etinoff.

A successful Kickstarter campaign to produce an English-language dub of the series was launched in January 2014. There were two prior English dub attempts. The first two episodes were shown for the first time in English during the 2009 London MCM Expo; this dub pilot is believed to have been recorded in France by expats, many of whom previously worked on the English version of Code Lyoko. A second English dub pilot recorded by Ocean Studios was shown at Anime Expo in 2011.

The series was previously dub to Polish in February 2010.

The third season of the series premiered in France on September 2, 2017. Season 3 premiered on Netflix worldwide on April 6, 2018. The release was originally planned for April 1, but was delayed to avoid conflicts with the Easter holiday weekend and the respective holiday event in the Wakfu game.

On May 7, 2020, Ankama announced that season 4 would premiere in early 2024, intended as the final chapter of the story, and a Kickstarter campaign to fund its production was launched on June 8, 2020. On January 16, 2024, Ankama announced that season 4 would be released on February 9.

On February 12, 2025, Ankama announced the creation of a fifth season, which was fully funded on Kickstarter.

== Plot ==
The series follows a little boy named Yugo, who travels the world with a group of friends on a quest to find his birth family.

== Characters ==
=== Main ===
Left to right: Evangelyne, Sir Percedal of Sadlygrove, Yugo, Ruel Stroud, and Princess Amalia Sheran Sharm

==== The Brotherhood of the Tofu ====
Yugo
Voiced by: Fanny Bloc, Valentin Vincent (adult) (French); Jules de Jongh (Season 1-2 & OVAs), Erika Harlacher (Season 3), Crystal Lopez (Season 4), Samuel Romero (adult) (English)
Yugo is a 12-year-old (13-year-old in season 2, 14-year-old in manga, 19-year-old in special episodes, and 20-23-year-old in seasons 3-4) Eliatrope who recently discovered his powers, and is on a mission to find his true family. He has lived with his adoptive father Alibert, working alongside him at his inn, and has no memories of his real family, and a kind and adventurous boy. He has the ability to summon teleportation portals by rotating his hand in a circular motion and throwing them to where he would like to appear. As the series progresses, he learns other abilities, such as moving at high speeds and creating beams from his portals. Near the end of the second season, it is revealed that he is the King of the Eliatropes. Yugo utilizes the 6 Eliatrope Dofus to attain godly power in an effort to defeat Ogrest, but doing so costs him his brother's friendship and nearly destroys the world.
In the third season, it is shown that Yugo and Ruel have been trying to find Adamaï everywhere, to no avail. When Adamaï, using their psychic link, shows Yugo the seeming death of Percedal, Yugo rushes to help his friend, still unable to believe his brother could be capable of such evil. It is later revealed that his actions created Oropo, an evil counterpart of Yugo. In the fourth season, he encountered his sister Nora and their mother, the Goddess Eliatrope, and got into conflict with the Necros, their leader Toross Mordal, and Yugo and Nora's corrupted brother Efrim. After being captured by Toross and his Wakfu was used to feed the Necros, Yugo instantly aged into an adult. Following Toross and the Necros' defeat, he married Amalia, becoming her husband and King of the Sadida Kingdom.

Az
A "Tofu" (bird) that is always seen by Yugo's side.

Queen Amalia Sheran Sharm
Voiced by: Adeline Chetail (French); Jessica Bell (Season 1-2 & OVAs), Christine Marie Cabanos (Season 3), Jackie Rodriguez (Season 4) (English)
Known as the Adventurer-Princess, she is a 13-year-old (14-year-old in season 2, 15-year-old in manga, 20-year-old in special episodes and 23-year-old in seasons 3-4) Sadida. She is able to talk to plants as well as control them. She is devoted to her friends and to helping Yugo find his family. Near the end of season one, it is revealed that she dislikes and has many disputes with her brother Armand. The Special Episodes 6 years after the second season show Amalia has taken her mother's position as Queen of the Sadida and her forced marriage to Count Harebourg of Frigost begins the story. Though she initially accepts his proposal, she avoids the agreement after learning the Count planned to use the Sadida forests as a fuel source for his kingdom. By the finale, Amalia and Yugo have shown a strong desire to be with each other, in spite of the difficulties caused by the difference in their races. As of the third season, Amalia has withdrawn from society and rarely leaves her father's side, but agrees to leave to look for Percedal with Yugo when he comes asking for help. In the fourth season, she aided the Brotherhood of the Tofu in fighting off the Necros to protect the World of Twelve. After her father had earlier passed away and Armand had died defending the Sadida Kingdom, Amalia succeeded them as Queen and eventually married Yugo, becoming his wife.

Sir Percedal of Sadlygrove (also nicknamed Dally in the English dub), (Messire Tristepin de Percedal, lit. Sir Sadlygrove of Percedal; renamed Pinpin (Grovy) in French)
Voiced by: Thomas Guitard (French); Ross Grant (Season 1-2 & OVAs), Kyle McCarley (Season 3), Anthony Heider (Season 4) (English)
A 16-year-old (17-year-old in season 2, 18-year-old in manga, 23-year-old in special episodes and 26-year-old in seasons 3-4) lop who was born on October 12, Percedal is a "Knight of the Order of the Guardians of Shushus", entrusted with the guardianship of the demon-sword Rubilax. He acts brave but foolhardy and is a strong fighter. As a Guardian, Percedal is responsible for making sure Rubilax does not escape its sword prison and possess its owner, or others, though when he is possessed by Rubilax he becomes a powerful monster. He is questing with friend Yugo as repayment for Yugo's rescuing him from Rubilax's possession. As the series progresses, he falls in love with Evangelyne and she with him, which later leads to them getting married. He becomes a father to twins, Elely and Flopin in the Special episodes and is revealed to be the reincarnation of the Iop God, but he chooses to leave his powers during the fight with Ogrest when he loses his right arm. In the third season, Percedal is living with Eva and their two children, training Elely in combat. When assassins attack them to steal the children and a pregnant Eva, Percedal and his family fight them off but when Adamai shows up, he is no match for him. Dropped off a cliff, Percedal almost dies and makes a deal with Rubilax to release him if he helps him save his family.

Rubilax
Voiced by: Gérard Surugue (French); Keir Stewart (Season 1-2 & OVAs), Doug Erholtz (Season 3), Donald Guzzi (Season 4) (English)
A Shushu trapped inside of Percedal's sword. He is obsessed with destruction and lends strength to any being he possesses. He is usually in the form of a dagger but can grow to the size of a longsword. His true form is a knee-high demon, however, he is still incredibly strong for his size and grows bigger every time he is hit. Rubilax can also create a small army of strong clay warrior-clones. As his time with the Brotherhood progresses, he eventually grows attached to the group, enough so to rebel against his own kind. In the third season, Adamai shatters the sword, damaging Rubilax. As Percedal is dying, Rubilax makes a deal with him to release the Shushu after he helps him save his family. Rubilax replaces Percedal's missing right arm and can assume any shape.

Evangelyne
Voiced by: Geneviève Doang (French); Jules de Jongh (Season 1-2 & OVAs), Kira Buckland (Season 3), Rosana Smith (Season 4) (English)
A 17-year-old (18-year-old in season 2, 19-year-old in manga, 24-year-old in special episodes and 27-year-old in seasons 3-4) Cra, Evangelyne is accompanying the Sadida princess Amalia as a bodyguard. She is committed to her job but also acts as an older sister to the young Amalia. She wields a bow that can fire a variety of magic arrows, making a quiver unnecessary. At first, she shows no attraction to Percedal but as the series progresses she admits that she loves him and starts a family with him by the time of the Special Episodes, marrying him at the end. In the third season, it is revealed that Eva is pregnant and living with Percedal and their two children, Elely and Flopin. When assassins attack them, she fights back but she and Flopin are captured and taken by Adamai. Before the final battle, she is forced to give birth and, with the help from Echo and Flopin, she safely gives birth to a second son, one whose powers were a threat to Oropo throughout the remainder of the season.

Ruel Stroud
Voiced by: Patrick Bethune (Season 1-3 & OVAs), Xavier Fagnon (Season 4) (French); Hugo Chandor (Season 1-2 & OVAs), Keith Silverstein (Season 3), Doug Turkel (Season 4) (English)
Ruel is an old friend of Yugo's adoptive father Alibert, as well as a treasure- and bounty-hunter known as an Enutrof. As a favor to Alibert, Ruel agrees to accompany Yugo on his travels. Ruel is greedy and stingy. He is skilled as a fighter and is committed to seeing Yugo through the trouble. Ruel wields a gold-plated shovel as a weapon. In the third season, it is revealed that he is a demi-god son of Enutrof and targeting by the Siblings into joining their group, much like Sadlygrove's and Evangelyne's kids. Ruel has an estranged wife, Arpagone, who is with the Siblings. Ruel is a grandfather-figure to Yugo, whom Ruel named his intended heir to his fortune.

Junior
A pig-like mole creature called a dhreller, which are said to be usual pets of Enutrofs. When he started to tag along, Ruel would try to drive it away. It is later revealed it is because after the death of his first drheller, Kamasu-Tar, he did not wish to have another one. After Junior saves Ruel from a Sadida prison, Ruel starts to show a liking to him.

Elely and Flopin
Elely voiced by: Caroline Lallau (French); Jules de Jongh (OVAs), Cristina Valenzuela (Season 3), Christina Costello (Season 4) (English)
Flopin voiced by: Karl-Line Heller (French); Julie-Ann Dean (OVAs), Marcy Edwards (Season 3), Kristina Abreu (Season 4) (English)
The twin children of Percedal and Evangelyne, Elely is the daughter and is as wild and unpredictable as her father, while Flopin is the son and is as calm and cool as his mother, and is equally skilled with a wrist-mounted crossbow. When their parents and the other members of the Brotherhood were held hostage by Count Harebourg, they stormed the palace to rescue them. Flopin used his mom's bow to help free the Brotherhood while Elely merged with Rubilax to give them a fighting chance, with their fighting skills impressing their parents. After the climactic battle Yugo and Percedal have with Ogrest, and after Ogrest returned to a normal baby ogre, Elely was the first person in ages to make friends with him. In the third season, the kids have grown slightly. Elely is a lot like her father, training hard and is shown to be able to defeat an opponent many time her size "using her head" - for pummeling them to submission. Flopin is the more reserved and bookish of the kids, being more like his mother. He ends up captured alongside her by Adamai but both later escape and they reunite with the rest of their family.

=== Secondary characters ===
Adamaï
Voiced by: Dorothee Pousseo (French); Joanna Ruiz (Season 1-2 & OVAs), Cristina Valenzuela (Season 3) (English)
A shape-shifting dragon who comes into contact with Yugo during their visit to the island of Oma and is revealed to be Yugo's twin brother, born of the same dofus. After separating from his friends, Yugo trains alongside Adamaï in order to control his wakfu and stop Nox from his sinister plans. Following the Special Episodes, Adamaï has severed ties with Yugo and the Brotherhood, after Yugo attacked him in order to utilize the Eliatrope Dofus to challenge Ogrest. His current whereabouts are unknown, except that he is now allied with the Forgotten Brotherhood, led by Lady Echo. In the third season, it is revealed that Adamai joined Lady Echo's brotherhood of other god-offsprings and assumed a humanoid form. Adamaï pursues Percedal's children, intending to have them join the Brotherhood. However, after realizing that Oropo's plan involved letting the Elia Cube absorb the Dofu eggs, transforming it into a bomb powerful enough to destroy the worlds, Adamai betrays Oropo and sides with Yugo.

Grufon (Skribble in the English dub)
Voiced by: Damien Da Silva (French); Taylor Clarke-Hill (English)
A small bear-like Shushu who is imprisoned inside a map. In the beginning, he would only show the group where to go if they flattered him, but he would never give them proper directions. He was later eaten by an Arachnee (a spider-like creature) but ended up possessing the Arachnee and attacking the group. After being captured, Yugo promised to be Skribble's guardian if he would let them go. Skribble agreed and has since then been more agreeable to show the proper way.

==== Sadida ====
They are a humanoid species who are close to nature and are most noticeable for being barefoot, having green hair, dark skin, and wearing clothes made out of leaves. The males have their hair covering their entire heads. They are all connected to the Tree of Life.

King Oakheart Sheran Sharm
Voiced by: Phillipe Dumond (French); Tom Clarke-Hill (Season 1-2 & OVAs), Kirk Thornton (Season 3) (English)
Amalia's father and king of the Sadida people. He is a jolly man as well as not familiar with formalities despite his king status, always questioning why Eva would always bow before him. He temporarily left his post to Armand when the Tree of Life was sick, trying to cure it. He later regains his throne after being informed of Nox's plan by Amalia and Eva. In the third season, it is revealed the King is gravely ill and confined to his bed, and expects to die soon. King Oakheart eventually passed away at a later point, leading his son Prince Armand to succeed him as king.

Queen Sheran Sharm
Voiced by: Jessica Barrier (French); Fiona Clarke (English)
Amalia's mother and queen of the Sadida people. She died before the start of the story when Amalia was little. The king says that Amalia is the spitting image of her, both stubborn and adventurous. However, she appears in Evangeline's dream in her time at the Tree of Life

King Armand Sheran Sharm
Voiced by: Cedric Dumond (French); James Nickerson (Season 1-2 & OVAs), Doug Erholtz (Season 3), Rayner Garranchan (Season 4) (English)
Amalia's brother and was the acting ruler of the Sadida while the king is away. He is an arrogant man and believed the warning about Nox from his sister was nothing but her own imagination. He is attracted to Evangelyne, something that creeps her out and causes Percedal to become jealous. Armand also appears to have a racist view towards Iops, often insulting them. In the third season, due to the king's illness, Armand has all but taken over the throne and is constantly annoyed by how his sister does not care about politics. He is married to an Osamodas princess and tried to marry off Amalia as well. In the fourth season, following his father's death, he became the new Sadida king until his own death when he sacrificed himself to protect his kingdom and people from the Necrons.

Chamberlain Tofdrew
Voiced by: Gérard Surugue (French); Eric Meyers (English)

Canar & Renate
Canar voiced by: Arnaud Laurent (French); Taylor Clarke-Hill (Season 1-2), Eric Meyers (OVAs) (English)
Renate voiced by: Damien Da Silva (French); Eric Meyers (Series), Tom Clarke-Hill (Mini-Wakfu) (English)

==== Other ====
Alibert
Voiced by: Thierry Mercier (Seasons 1-2 & OVAs), Paul Borne (Season 4) (French); Joe Mills (Seasons 1-2 & OVAs), J.D. Kaye (Season 4) (English)
Yugo's adoptive father, who found him as a baby when Grougaloragran left him at the beginning of the series. He is also the town mayor and a chef, who runs an inn. After taking the young boy under his care, Alibert has also ingrained a magical message through his eyes regarding Yugo's past. He raises Yugo for 12 years, training him as an assistant chef at the inn's restaurant, until the day their hometown comes under attack by a mysterious enemy and Yugo's past must be revealed.

Cleophee (Cleome in the English dub)
Voiced by: Maryne Bretieaux (French); Joanna Ruiz (English)
Evangelyne's younger sister. She is a tomboy and more easy-going than her older sister. She was in the Cra military and is a skilled fighter who works well with Percedal in hand-to-hand combat, which seems to make Evangelyne worried that Percedal might like Cleophee more than her. After the battle on the Crimson Claws, she sailed back home to Cra City with Elaine and Black Ink.

Grougaloragran
Voiced by: Benoit Allemane (Season 1), Frantz Confiac (Special) (French); Tom Clarke-Hill (Season 1), Justice Washington (Special) (English)
A dragon who took care of Yugo before Nox saw him. He has the powers to see into people's souls, which is why he picked Alibert for Yugo's father, as he saw he would be the perfect father. Until his rebirth, Grougaloragran was the father-figure of Adamaï, after which their roles became reversed with Adamaï having to be the parental figure to the reborn Grougal.

Master Goultard
Voiced by: Bruno Choel (French); Anthony Adonis (Season 1-2 & OVAs), Ben Pronsky (Season 3), Federico Slezynger (Season 4) (English)
A powerful demigod Iop who is Percedal's mentor. He is able to take down Rubilax's possessed form with a single strike of his sword, as well as he is the only being Rubilax has been shown to be afraid of. He gets Percedal back on his path after he was depressed over breaking Evangelyne's bow. It is later revealed in his fight with Rushu that he has become the new Iop god. After defeating Ogrest, Yugo leaves the six Eliatrope Dofus in Goultard's care, but in the third season it is revealed Adamaï stole them.

Master Joris
Voiced by: Yoann Sover (French); Eric Meyers (Seasons 1-2 & OVAs), Elgin David Aponte (Season 4) (English)
A wanderer whose face is hidden by his hood. He is a representative of the King of Bonta who came to discuss matters with Armand, who simply brushed him off. He is also very strong, wielding a hammer almost as tall as him and taking out a team of Sadida guards all on his own, as well as defeating (a damaged) Razortime very quickly. More of his backstory, including his origins, is revealed in the "Dofus: The Treasures of Kerubim" series and in the movie Dofus – Book 1: Julith. He was born as the child of Jahash Jurgen, Huppermage Supreme of Bonta, and Julith, the Butcher of Brakmar, who were mortal enemies who fell in love. After his mother returned to her old murderous ways, his father stopped her at the cost of his own life, and Joris was adopted and raised by Kerubim. Joris was revealed to be the host of the dragon Grougalorasalaar, who took residence in him when his Dofus was shattered.

Phaeris
Voiced by: Jean Barney (French); John Knowles (English)
A dragon who lived on the Crimson Claw archipelago in order to protect Shinonome's Dofus. When Qilby and Yugo fought for the Dofus, he defended Yugo against Qilby and a possessed Adamaï.

Balthazar
Voiced by: Gérard Surugue (French); Frank Stubbs (English)
An ancient dragon who watches over the children Eliatrope in the Emrub dimension.

Ogrest
Voiced by: Brigitte Lecordier, Mathias Kozlowski (Giant) (French); Julie-Ann Dean, Joe Mills (Giant) (English)
A gigantic goat-like creature who was accidentally created from Ogrines and a piece of candy a long time ago by an alchemist named Otomaï. He is known for creating natural disasters dubbed Ogrest's Chaos, in which his tears create giant floods.

Otomaï
Voiced by: Mark Lesser (French); Brad Kavanagh (English)
A Feca alchemist who accidentally created Ogrest and treated him as his son. He at some point leaves Ogrest, leading Ogrest to believe he was abandoned.

Elaine Narrowsmith and Captain Black Ink
Elaine Narrowsmith voiced by: Claire Baradat (French); Julie-Ann Dean (English)
Captain Black Ink voiced by: Martin Brieuc (French); Frank Stubbs (English)
Elaine is a Brakmarian girl who is a pirate just like her adoptive father, Black Ink, who is from the squid-like species of Kralove. They both make their first appearance in "A Fistful of Kamas" when they helped the Brotherhood find a boat to sail to the Crimson Claws archipelago. At the end of the second season, Elaine and Black Ink sailed back home, with Cleophee along for the ride. In the fourth season, they make a return as they congratulated Yugo and Amalia getting married after Yugo is now a handsome man.

Prince Adale
Voiced by: Alexandre Gillet (French); Eric Meyers (English)
The prince of New Sufokia, nation of the seas and oceans. His nation was wiped out by Ogrest's Chaos centuries ago, thanks to the scientists of his nation they were able to build an undersea dome as a temporary sanctuary until they fully re-built their society on Crimson Claws. The island holds an ore that enables them to fuel their machines.

General Frida Mofette
Voiced by: Déborah Perret (French); Jules de Jongh (English)
The commander of Prince Adale's army, in the battle at The Crimson Claws Island she appears to have to most fun slaughtering Shushus.

Soft Oak
Voiced by: Marc Cassot (French); Keir Stewart (English)
The tallest and oldest tree of the Forbidden Forest, located just outside Alibert and Yugo's village. He is killed after Nox drains him and many of his tress of their Wakfu.

Kabrok and Miranda
Kabrok voiced by: Richard Darbois (Episode 3), Patrick Bethune (Mini-Wakfu) (French); Keir Stewart (English)
Miranda voiced by: Claire Buyot (Episode 3), Diane Dassigny (Episode 11), Nathalie Regnier (Mini-Wakfu) (French); Fiona Clarke (English)
Kabrok is an Osamoda adventurer from days long past, who eventually found his true love in the form of an Ecaflip named Miranda. Soon after, the couple settled down and began running an underground item shop for weary travelers. However, Kabrok began to grow bored of his new life while Miranda forbid him to go adventuring, so he donned the guise of a villain called "The Black Crow" and has a ball of a time torturing a nearby village and destroying his competitors' shops in the process. He also dislikes Ruel as he often hits on his wife. Miranda is a strict saleswoman who will even put customers through a test so as to not deal with looky-loos. At the end of the first season, it is shown they are expecting a child.

The Ugly Princesses (Princess Eenca, Ydalipe, Erpel, and Lela)
Eenca voiced by: Jessica Barrier (French); Julie-Ann Dean (English)
Ydalipe voiced by: Audrey Le Bihan (French); Fiona Clarke (English)
Erpel voiced by: Caroline Pascal (French); Fiona Clarke (English)
Lela voiced by: Celine Ronte (French); Jules de Jongh (English)
A group of princesses who were cursed with ugliness by the god Osamodes after they insulted them; the only way to break the curse is for one of them to be kissed by a man. Their curse is broken when Percedal blows them a sincere kiss, but they go right back to turning down suitors.

The Puddlies
Tiny gelatinous creatures that often plagued the Taure brothers who often steal their food with brute force. Yugo and company come across both races on their visit to Puddlie village and Sadlygrove feels a sense of responsibility in teaching them how to defend themselves against the Bullies. Eventually, Yugo takes on the Bully leader and defeats him, sending the whole stampede packing.

Nausica
Voiced by: Elisabeth Fargeot (French); Fiona Clarke (English)
Nausica is an Eniripsa healer who helped the heroes after Amalia was bitten by a demonic rose although the poison was beyond her ability to heal. She directed them to a sap legendary for its healing properties, and Yugo and Ruel brought back several phials, one of which was used to cure Amalia. They gave the rest to her as thanks.

Xav the Baker
Voiced by: William Coryn (French); Taylor Clarke-Hill (English)
A baker from Chtibrout Town who is famous for his incredible-tasting golden wheat bread. His storage is ruined by a monster called Breadnought, not long before the deadline for a baking contest where the winner can present their bread to the King of Bonta. To help Xav win the contest, Yugo becomes his assistant and trains under him, so Xav teaches Yugo how to mold bread as if he were training with a weapon. After the Baker's Tournament, Yugo and company stay at Xav's home before heading out for their next adventure.

Helene
Voiced by: Dolly Vanden (French); Jules de Jongh (English)
Xav's wife and the mother of their two children.

Ratafouine (Ratweasel in the English dub)
Voiced by: Gérard Surugue (French); Tom Clarke-Hill (English)

Tolot, Calben, and Posho
Tolot voiced by: Vincent Grass (French); Joe Mills (English)
Calben voiced by: Frederic Cerdal (French); Eric Meyers (English)
Posho voiced by: Michel Mella (French); Tom Clarke-Hill (English)
Old friends of Ruel and his team members in his Gobbowl team The Real Boitards.

Kriss Krass
Voiced by: Mathias Kozlowski (French); Taylor Clarke-Hill (English)
A Sacrier wishes to become the most famous and highly respected Gobbowl player. He is originally from Brakmar, however, he leaves the city, to be the captain of The Red Gobbowls Bonta team. He is in love with Maude, however, she prefers the state masked Gowlbowler, in the episode The Masked Gobbowler, it is revealed who she really is. When Kriss returns to Brakmar, he is judged by Judge Bokobrodego.

The Red Gobbowls (Lame Chester in the English dub)
Kriss Krass' Gobbowl team consisting of Mounu, Jay, Jeremy, and Benji. They face off against Ruel's team The Real Boitards in Bonta.

Jactance
Voiced by: Cedric Dumond (French); Tom Clarke-Hill (English)
A Gobbowl commentator from Bonta. He commentates over the match between The Real Boitards and The Red Gobbowls. He later joins with his brother in Brakmar, Tendynite, to commentate over the match between Kriss' stand-in team and The Brak'N'Blacks.

Botun
Voiced by: Gabriel Ledoze (French); Tom Clarke-Hill (English)

Moon
Voiced by: Thomas Guitard (French); Fiona Clarke (Episode 14), Taylor Clarke-Hill (Mini-Wakfu) (English)

Master Drill
Voiced by: Pierre Hatet (French); Eric Meyers (English)
An Osamodas who watches over the ruins of an ancient dragon temple, and is father of Lotie and Mica.

Lotie and Mica
Lotie voiced by: Jennifer Fauveau (French); Fiona Clarke (English)
Mica voiced by: Sauvane Delanoë (French); Jules de Jongh (English)
Drill's two children who care for injured animals. Lotie soon adopts Nox's bow wow, Igole, and renames him Crazy-Eye.

Chibi
Grougaloragran's Eliatrope brother.

Moumoune
Voiced by: Perrette Pradier (French); Julie-Ann Dean (English)
Ruel's grandmother, she runs a cable cart business and is even more stingy and greedy than Ruel, whom she raised and claimed to have "spoiled" although flashbacks reveal she spent as little as possible on Ruel's upbringing, which included only feeding him a few peas on his birthday and refusing to buy him treats of any kind, claiming they would rot his teeth when she did not want to spend money. She refused to give him a discount and despite her stinginess, she loves her grandson in her own selfish and twisted way.

Justice Knight
Voiced by: Vincent Ropion (French); Taylor Clarke-Hill (English)
A knight clad in golden armor who sworn to protect the world from Shushus. Prior to the start of the second season, he and his father the original Justice Knight were attacked by Rubilax while he was in possession of Percedal's body. During his attack he causes Anathar to be freed and take over his father. Justice Knight has no choice but to cage him in a prison for the Shushu.

Justice Knight, Sr.
Voiced by: Antoine Tome (French); Joe Mills (English)
Justice Knight's father who unleashed Anathar, forcing Justice to have to lock him is his prison.

The Masked Gobbowler
Voiced by: Karine Foviau (French); Fiona Clarke (English)
A Brakmarian woman who is the captain of The Brak'N'Blacks. Her team faces off against Kriss Krass with Yugo and the gang serving as his stand-in team. Kriss Krass and his team in Brakmar were about to be executed when it was revealed two of their players were actually girls, she reveals her true identity as Maude who was actually an old of friend of Kriss'. Because of Brakmar's rules forbidding females to play Gobbowl, she has a mask to conceal her identity.

The Brak'N'Blacks
Maude's Gobbowl team consisting of Actator, Leol'Brak, Albarus, and Rhaboss. They play against Kriss Krass' stand-in team until Maude revealed her true identity, feeling betrayed they decided to play against her with The Emporg serving as their new captain.

Prince/King of Brakmar (Queen of Brakmar in Season 4)
Voiced by: Rémi Caillebot (French); Arthur Bostrom (Season 2), Yenni Ann (Season 4) (English)
The fickle, hot-tempered, prejudiced and manipulative ruler of Brakmar. Like in the French dub, he was male in the English dub, but was replaced in the fourth season with a female version of the character, who is referred to as the Queen of Brakmar.

Judge Benchwig
Voiced by: Bernard Tiphaine (French)
A Brakmarian judge who presided over the trial of Kriss Krass with Judge Bokobrodego. After the Brotherhood of the Tofu were exposed for cheating in Gobbowl, Benchwig has them, with Kriss among them, sentenced to death only to then include Maude when she was revealed to be the Masked Gobbowler. He cancels the execution when the Brak'N' Blacks demanded a trial by Gobbowl and he orders the release of the Emporg so he could serve as their new captain.

Tendynite
Voiced by: Nessym Guetat (French); Jimmy Hibbert (English)
A Jactance's brother who commentates over Gobbowl games and even court trials. He and Jactance both commentate over the match between Kriss Krass' stand-in team and The Brak'N'Blacks.

Pandiego de la Vega
Voiced by: Jean-Pierre Michael (French); Joe Mills (English)

A Pandawa bamboo farmer

Phil Harmonic
Voiced by: Edgar Givry (French); Frank Stubbs (English)

Wa Wabbit
Voiced by: Christophe Lemoine (French); Jimmy Hibbert (English)

Lenald
Voiced by: Benoit Du Pac (French); Tom Clarke-Hill (English)

Bordegann
Voiced by: Constantin Pappas (French); Tom Clarke-Hill (English)

Alia
Voiced by: Camille Donda (French); Jules de Jongh (English)

Leon Zitrool
Voiced by: Martin Brieuc (French); Frank Stubbs (English)

Sho-Bubu
Voiced by: Arnaud Arbessier (French); John Knowles (English)

Melo
Voiced by: Claire Baradat (French); Fiona Clarke (English)

Aurora
Voiced by: Marie Facundo (French); Cherami Leigh (English)
Armand's Osamodas wife. Both she and Armand often try to convince Amalia to marry one of her relatives.

Ashtur
Voiced by: Patrick Bethune (French); Joe Ochman (English)
Aurora's cousin. He is presented to Amalia as a potential husband.

The Council of Six
The leading faction of the Eliatrope race, composed of the six First Born Eliatropes and their Dragon twin siblings. Virtually immortal, these Eliatropes and Dragons never truly die, but reincarnate continuously from their shared Dofus. Each pair held an important post in Eliatrope society but fluctuated often between protecting, guiding and teaching their people. Chibi and Grougalorogran were poets, prophets, and inventors. Chibi was also the first king of the Eliatropes. Mina and Phaeris were priests and diplomats, known for resolving conflicts that emerged among the people. Chibi and Mina were also secret lovers. Yugo and Adamai were great explorers and warriors, charged with protecting the Eliatropes and leading them in battle. Yugo also succeeded Chibi as king. Nora and her brother Efrim were channelers, able to speak directly to the great goddess Eliatrope, the source of all Wakfu. Glip and his brother Baltazaar were teachers and loremasters, responsible for instructing Eliatropes young in all areas of life, including combat. Qilby and his sister Shinanome were the wisest of the First Born, both of them blessed with an eternal memory of all their past incarnations, unlike their other siblings. They served loyally for many years, but Qilby was eventually driven mad by boredom (as his eternal memory prevented him from re-experiencing life through his reincarnations) and rebelled, forcing a bloody campaign against a mechanoid race known as the Mechasme that nearly led to the extinction of the Eliatrope race before Yugo and Phaeris were able to imprison Qilby for his crimes. Apart from this, the First Born are shown to be capable of immense power and judging by the special episodes, aged at a far slower rate than their peers.

=== Antagonists ===
Nox
Voiced by: Benjamin Pascal (French); Arthur Bostrom (Season 1), Kaiji Tang (Season 3) (English)
The main villain of the first season. A Xelor born on 12 of October, with twisted and obsessive motives. At the beginning of season one, he encounters Grougaloragran in the guise of a human and is initially surprised by his high levels of Wakfu. Nox is swiftly immobilized and has since been searching for Grougaloragran on his travels, as well as any other large sources of Wakfu to absorb. Nox seeks to gain a large quantity of Wakfu to travel back in time and undo a great wrong that he has done. He eventually goes after the Tree of Life, which would kill the Sadida with it. Despite absorbing Wakfu for over 200 years, Nox is only able to travel back 20 minutes in time. Upon discovering this, he grieves at the fact he will never be able to save his family. No longer supported by the Eliacube, Nox's body withers and turns to dust.
His past was revealed in a special episode, where he used to be a kind well muscular father figure named Noximilien Coxen with a flair for inventing and great skills as a horologist. He was a good father and loved his wife and children more than anything, but was depressed at the fact he could not provide financially for his family, often having to negotiate with a man over his debt. While playing with his family on the beach, Igol ran away and discovered the Eliacube. Noximilien takes it to his workshop and tinkers with it, amazed at the possibilities the device has, he becomes obsessed with researching the cube to the point of abandoning everything else. His health deteriorates and he hints that he no longer sleeps; these serve to degrade his body to a skeletal state. His family also leaves him; by the time he leaves his workshop to present his work to his wife, his home is shown to be barren and dilapidated, and a note shows that his wife has moved to live with her sister, telling him to come join them if he's ever ready. Before he receives the chance, he is told they have died in a flood. In a desperate state, he plunges deeper into his research, seeking a means to turn back time and correct his mistake.

Marama, Frisco, and Tartufo
Three of Nox's minions, which he refers to as his "favorites." They are first seen during his fight with Grougaloragran and...although their exact nature is unknown, they appear to be a mummified Cra, Feca, and Sacrier, and possess most of those classes' respective powers. They are all destroyed in the final battle. Defeated by Adamaï and Yugo, Marama is finally destroyed by Raze-time; Frisco and Tartufo are destroyed by Amalia.

Weedkilios
A Sadida analog to Marama, Frisco, and Tartufo. Much of his apparent bulk seems to come from his wood armor. he is frozen by Evangelyne and destroyed by Amalia.

XII Raze-time
A large clockwork-like robot created by Nox, and one of his most powerful weapons. Before being confronted by the main characters, it devastated a large section of the Sadidas' forest with its "stasis blasts." He was deactivated for good when Nox's clock is destroyed.

Igole
Nox's pet Bow Wow. He can travel at extremely fast speeds and has the ability to run on water to get from island to island when traveling over-sea. Igole was previously owned by a little girl who is later revealed to have been Nox's daughter, who drowned due to Ogrest's tears along with the rest of his family. In the present, Igole is adopted by an Osamoda girl named Lotie, who resembles Nox's daughter. Igole once appeared to be a normal dog, but after being mutated by the Eliacube, he became a hyena-like creature.

Qilby
Voiced by: Erik Colin (Season 2), Laurent Morteau (Seasons 3-4) (French); Arthur Bostrom (Season 2), Joe Ochman (Season 3), Felix Bermudez (Season 4) (English)
An elderly eliatrope and member of the Council of Six, set free from his imprisonment unintentionally by Yugo. He acts as an ally and uses his knowledge of their species to manipulates Yugo into seeking the Dofus of his dragon sister, Shinonome. Qilby's true plan is to steal back the Eliacube and drain the Wakfu of the planet to power his ship to explore the Krozmos with his brothers and sisters.

Qilby is revealed to have once been imprisoned in an empty, timeless dimension by a previous incarnation of Yugo as punishment for betrayal. Qilby orchestrated a war with a robotic species called the Mechasms, resulting in the deaths of many eliatropes and the need for them to abandon their original world. Cunning and conniving, Qilby nearly succeeds but is defeated by a combined effort by Yugo, the last remaining eliatrope children, and the unborn Shinonome. Separated from the Eliacube, he is imprisoned in the same timeless dimension by Yugo. Qilby returns in the fourth season as a supporting character, and dies in episode 10 after Yugo is transformed into a handsome man.

==== Shushus ====
The Shushus are a race of demons with the ability to possess objects and people. They came from a dimension called Fab'hugruta.

Rushu
Voiced by: Marc Alfos (French) [fr]; Jimmy Hibbert (English)
The tyrannical king of all Shushus. a colossal 10-meter tall fiery demon, he is the one that has mostly been destroyed down to rock and ash and is looking for a way to enter the World of Twelve, so full of light and life, that he and his demons can keep destroying things. During his battle with Goultard, his true form was revealed to be a grayish-blue cyclops-like humanoid with a yellow eye.

Anathar
Voiced by: Antoine Tome (French); Joe Mills (Most Appearances), John Knowles (Episode 34), Ross Grant (Episodes 49, 51) (English)
A skeletal jackal-like Shushu with the power to copy the ability of anyone he touches. Originally a bound prisoner, he was released by his guardian and refused to be unsummoned. After being accidentally freed by the Brotherhood of Tofu, Remington releases him to distract the heroes; he quickly realizes this is a bad idea. Anathar participates in the final battle in possing Adamaï against Yugo, but he is betrayed and threatened of destruction by Qilby, he decides to leave him to take care of Adamai and Yugo, Qilby accepts and kills Anathar.

Ombrage (Shadowfang in the English dub)
Voiced by: Malvina Germain (French); Fiona Clarke (English)
A seductive vampire-like Shushu imprisoned in a ring, she has the power to steal a person's shadow, which appears to represent the target's soul, and turns them into a ghoul. However, she is unable to do this if the target lacks any darkness in their heart. She is first met in a ruined town, where she has taken over her guardian's spirit, who goes by the name Vampyro. After being defeated, her guardian swears never to fall for her tricks again. She returns in the second season as an ally of Rubilax. Once Percedal is returned to his body, though, she is left behind, ignored by her guardian. In the closing scenes, however, an unknown fisherman picks her up.

==== The Brotherhood of the Forgotten/The Siblings ====
The main antagonists of the third season. The Brotherhood is a secret Guild whose members are all demigods or children of Dragons, making them semi-immortal. Their stated goal is to replace their parents and become the new gods of the World of Twelve, believing that the gods don't care about them and that the world has become horribly corrupt under their rule. They threw down the gauntlet against the Brotherhood of Tofu in the third season because their leader, Oropo, desires both the Percedal family children and Ruel to join their new pantheon. Furthermore, he has an unspecified need for Yugo's help as well in his plan. To that end, he is using the weaknesses and doubts in the characters to try to bring them to his side. However, later episodes reveal that not everyone in The Siblings fully trusts their leader and some begin to move on their own.

Oropo
Voiced by: Franck Lorrain (French); Christopher Corey Smith (Season 3), Roly Gutierrez (Season 4 & Special) (English)
Oropo is the owl-masked leader of the Brotherhood. He believes that the current gods are lazy and selfish, and wants to usurp them alongside The Siblings. Oropo is very calm and persuasive individual, able to win others to his side with these traits. He claims to hate violence and chaos, and is lenient on others despite what he considers flaws in their personalities. He also follows the principles of the end justifying the means, and that sacrifice is necessary for change. Oropo is extremely powerful, able to bend time and space in the creation of his multi-dimensional tower of dreams. He is also able to enter people's minds through the cracks of their doubts and fears.

Lady Echo
Voiced by: Hélène Bizot (French); Julie-Ann Dean (OVAs), Cherami Leigh (Season 3), Katlyn Dannes (Season 4 & Special) (English)
The second in command of The Siblings, meant to replace her mother Eniripsa. Echo is the face of the guild whenever Oropo is not around. It was revealed that she is in a relationship with Oropo and joined his cause for aligning to his beliefs and simultaneously being in love with him.

Adamaï
Voiced by: Jeremy Prevost (French); Todd Haberkorn (Season 3), Christian Vandepas (Season 4) (English)
Once a member of the Brotherhood of the Tofu, but soon joins the Siblings after a falling out between him and Yugo over using the Eliatrope Dofus. Adamaï gained a taller body and even more powerful abilities after draining the Eliatrope Dofus, becoming even darker and villainous, willing to kill his former friends. He returns to his good self as he reunites with Yugo.

Sipho
Voiced by: Jean-François Vlérick (French); Taylor Clarke-Hill (OVA), Keith Silverstein (Season 3), Josh Portillo (Season 4) (English)
Child of a dragon, used as a spy.

Count Harebourg
Voiced by: Sylvain Agaësse (French); Jimmy Hibbert (English)
A Xelor demigod who is a master of time and ice magic. In the OVA, he was to be Amalia's groom in a political engagement in exchange for two Dofus for Yugo; but a front to use the Sadida forest to power his kingdom. Imprisoned for his actions in the OVA, meant to replace his Father Xelor when the time comes.

Ush Galesh
Voiced by: Jonathan Amram (OVA & Season 4), Nathanel Alimi (Season 3) (French); Taylor Clarke-Hill (OVA), Joe Ochman (Season 3), Kevin Garcia (Season 4) (English)
A demigod Ecaflip who is intended to replace his father. Tends to treat everything as a game, but in doing so he will respect the rules of the game.

Poo
Voiced by: Pascal Casanova (French); Kirk Thornton (Season 3), Frank Montoto (Season 4) (English)
A clumsy demigod Pandawa working with Adamaï for the Forgotten Brotherhood. Despite his size, he is very fast and agile. After attacking Percedal and Eva and their family, Adamaï tasks him with finding the escaped Elely. When challenged by her, he just toys with the kher but ends up being knocked unconscious due to her Iop tenacity to never give up.

Toxine
Voiced by: Caroline Combes (French); Reba Buhr (English)
A Sram assassin who can turn invisible and has a featureless black body with glowing green markings. She uses a poisonous dagger in battle.

Coqueline (Mishell in the English dub)
Voiced by: Emmylou Homs (French); Cassandra Morris (Season 3), Annemarie Blanco (Season 4) (English)
Member to replace her father Osamodas.

Dark Vlad
Voiced by: Cyrille Monge (French); Ben Pronsky (English)
Goultard's evil persona that is forcibly transformed by Adamai when he stole the Eliatrope Dofus. They kept him as a challenge to the heroes, since Elely is the one they desire to be their Iop God, not him.

Black Bump
Voiced by: Boris Rehlinger (French); Kaiji Tang (Season 3), Jesse Inocalla (Season 4) (English)
Member meant to replace his mother, Feca.

Arpagone
Voiced by: Cathy Diraison (French); Cindy Robinson (Season 3), Elizabeth Price (Season 4) (English)
The only member who is not a demigod as she joined to help force her estranged husband, Ruel, to replace Enutrof.

Dathura
Voiced by: Geneviève Doang (Special), Celine Melloul (Season 3) (French); Fiona Clarke (Special), Cindy Robinson (Season 3), Elizabeth Price (Season 4) (English)
Member, meant to replace her father, the god Sadida. This is the very same being whose actions caused Ogrest to become the living natural disaster he had been for centuries, a fact that fills her with guilt.

Kali
Voiced by: Marie Facundo (French); Kira Buckland (Season 3), Kelsey Poppen (Season 4) (English)
Member to replace her mother Sacrier.

==== Other ====
Mandhul
Voiced by: Michel Vigne (French); Keir Stewart (English)

Taure Bullies
Voiced by: Michel Vigne, Gérard Surugue (French); Tom Clarke-Hill, Taylor Clarke-Hill, Joe Mills (English)
A group of bull-like monsters that plague the Puddlies by stealing their food with brute force.

Vampyro
Voiced by: Benjamin Pascal (French); Keir Stewart (English)
Formerly a Iop named Wagnar, he fell in love with a Shushu named Ombrage, who was sealed in a magic ring. Wagnar wore the ring that Ombrage was trapped in and her demonic powers transformed the guardian into "Vampyro", causing him to steal the souls of the townspeople to form an army of ghouls. When Yugo's team visits Katrepat town, Vampyro ambushes them with this army of ghouls and kidnaps Evangelyne in order to give Ombrage a body to inhabit. When transformed into Vampyro, he has an unfortunate allergy to Tofus, which eventually becomes his undoing. Afterward, he realized she was merely using him and swore to never fall for her trickery again. Ombrage returns in the second season, now wielded by Rubilax in Percedal's body.

Sybannak
Voiced by: Dolly Vanden (French); Fiona Clarke (English)

Breadnought
Voiced by: Elisabeth Fargeot (French); Julie-Ann Dean (Episode 8), Fiona Clarke (Mini-Wakfu) (English)
A Enutrof who seeks to ruin Xav the Baker's chances at winning the Chtibrout Baker's Tournament by destroying his golden wheat storage. She wreaks havoc on the village while riding atop a golem made of giant pieces of bread. Yugo takes on Breadnought and nearly wins, but she escapes before he claims victory. At the climax of the Baker's tournament, the Breadnought is revealed to be Xav's father's assistant, also known as Chouquette, who wanted her master to win the contest as she was in love with him.

Gonnard the Great (Rich McDeek in the English dub)
Voiced by: Serge Faliu (French); Eric Meyers (English)
A supposed herald who visits Yugo and his friends during their stay at Xav the Baker's home, informing them of a gold-robbery crime wave. Gonnard displays a herald's knowledge, seeming to know much about their adventures up to the point that he makes contact with them, but turns out to be an absorbent genie, whose body's substance becomes whatever he eats, and was responsible for the crimes. He is defeated when Ruel tricks him into eating chocolate coins.

Saule
Voiced by: Constantin Pappas (French); Joe Mills (English)

Smisse Monde
Voiced by: David Krüger (French); Eric Meyers (English)

Remington Smisse
Voiced by: David Krüger (French); Eric Meyers (English)
A charismatic Rogue who is a well-known collector of Shushu and is able to wield many of them without losing control over them. He is extremely sly and cunning, always trying to gain the upper hand through deceptive means and likes to play dirty. His deceptiveness sometimes becomes his own undoing; during a fight with Evangelyne over the possession of Percedal -- who was trapped in Rubilax's sword body -- he falls off the edge of a building, hanging upside down at the end of a rope. He promises Eva that he won't trick her if she saves him, however, when he gets to the ledge, he tries to kill her with a sword Shushu. Eva dodges the attack, and Remington ends up destroying the ledge he was hanging onto and plummets to his apparent death. However, it is revealed that he did survive the fall in Episode 8 of the second season. He meets Eva again in prison where he releases Anathar. Later on, he, Sadlygrove and Yugo are taken to the Shushu world. He is left behind while the others escape so he could save his brother, Grany and is presumed dead once again. Remington and Grany are later seen as Rushu's personal slave/masseur in Episode 20 until they escape through the Shushu invasion portal in Episode 24. At the end of the Battle of Crimson Claw Archipelago, Remington takes Eva hostage in exchange for Rubilax, but is defeated and knocked into the sea. Remington and Eva are last seen sailing into the sunset in a wrecked submarine.

Grany Smisse
Voiced by: Mathias Kozlowski (French); Tom Clarke-Hill (English)
A talking Bow Meow who Remington calls his brother, which Ruel finds odd. He is as sly and cunning as his brother, and like him not above using a double cross to get their way. Despite this, however, both brothers are shown to care about one another, as Remington chose to stay behind in the Shushu world to save him.

Dragon Pig
Voiced by: Patrick Bethune (French); Keir Stewart (English)
A wild boar/dragon hybrid who wants to get revenge on The Brotherhood of Tofu for hunting a baby piglet. Afterward, he kidnaps Ruel and takes him to his underground labyrinth. When looking for Ruel in his labyrinth Yugo, Eva, and Amalia are turned into pigs. Dally leads them through the rest of labyrinth and faces off against him, at the end. He is beaten by Dally and forced to free Ruel, as well turn Yugo, Eva and Amalia back to normal.

Riglesse
Voiced by: Mael-Davan Soulas (French); Jimmy Hibbert (English)

The Emporg
Voiced by: Bruno Magne (French); Keir Stewart (English)
A fearless, yet rude minotaur-like Brakmarian who is known for being the strongest player of Gobbowl.

The Voice Thief
Voiced by: Paolo Domingo (French); Taylor Clarke-Hill (English)

Felinor (Boris Eca in the English dub)
Voiced by: Loic Houdre (French); Tom Clarke-Hill (English)

Bellaphones
Voiced by: Anouck Hautbois (French); Fiona Clarke and Jules de Jongh (English)

Cassis
Voiced by: Martial Le Minoux (French); Frank Stubbs (English)

== Episodes ==
Season	Episodes	Originally released	
Season	Episodes	First aired	Last aired
1	26	October 30, 2008	June 5, 2010
Specials	4	July 7, 2007	November 17, 2023
2	26	February 26, 2011	March 3, 2012
OVAs	3	November 15, 2014	November 29, 2014
3	13	September 2, 2017	September 17, 2017
4	13	February 9, 2024	March 15, 2024

== Production ==
The series was animated with Adobe Flash, all the production is done at Ankama's headquarters in Roubaix, with the expection of some episodes of the third season that were outsourced at Kaibou Productions and Caribara in Montreal alongside Waooh! in Liège and the special episodes "Noximilien l'Horloger" and "Ogrest, la Légende", both produced in Japan, the episode was directed by Eunyoung Choi with Masaaki Yuasa on character designs and features a radically different art style made by the same team of animators who worked on Kaiba and Kemonozume.

== Reception ==
Wakfu has received generally positive reviews. Writing for Common Sense Media, reviewer Emily Ashby gave an overall positive review, praising the plot and graphics, but warned parents of elements potentially unsuitable for younger kids. The show has a rating of 8.1 on IMDb. Writing for thereviewgeek.com, Greg Wheeler, praised the plot and characters, but opined that the show has a slightly overlong runtime.

== Netflix streaming ==
Netflix acquired the right to the show and started showing it on its streaming, according to Variety Ted Sarandos, Netflix's CCO, said "Animation has a very strong history in France and French animators are among the best and most innovative in the world." Sarandos added that Netflix expected "to further strengthen our relationship with Ankama and other French animation studios." The series started airing on Netflix in September 2014. The dub for the third season uses an entirely new voice cast based in Los Angeles.

== Kickstarter campaigns ==
On January 20, 2014, Ankama launched a Kickstarter campaign to produce an English-language dub of the series for release on region-free Blu-ray Disc in English speaking territories. The campaign had a target of $80,000 Canadian Dollars to dub the first season, with stretch goals to produce dubs of the second season and various original video animation episodes. The campaign's goal to dub the first season was met on January 21, 2014, and the campaign's goal to dub the second season was met on January 30, 2014.

On June 8, 2020, Ankama launched another Kickstarter campaign for the production of the fourth season of the series, with an initial target of €100,000; the target was reached within an hour after the campaign started. In the end, more than 1.5 million euros were collected from nearly 18,000 donors, setting a European record.

On February 12, 2025, Ankama launched another Kickstarter campaign for the production of the fifth and final season of the series. Once again, the original target of €500,000 was reached within a few hours. However, it was plainly known that this would not be enough, as €500,000 is the cost of a single episode, and Ankama would need €13 million for a full season, expecting that half of this would come from the donors.
