= List of Wakfu episodes =

The following is a list of episodes of the Ankama Animations cartoon television series Wakfu, which premiered on October 30, 2008. The show is based on a turn-based tactical MMORPG based on the series of the same name (although the show's second season was airing by the time the game was finished) and airs on France 3. The story follows a boy named Yugo and his friends as they set out on a journey to discover Yugo's origins, while meeting people and saving the world on their way.

Seasons 1 and 2 each have 26 episodes, while seasons 3 and 4 each have 13 episodes. Included in-between seasons 2 and 3 are three original video animations (OVAs), along with three specials, bringing the total to 84 episodes.

The English cast for the first two seasons and the OVAs featured actors based in the UK; however, the dub of season 3 switches to an entirely new cast based in Los Angeles. The dub for season 4 would also switch to another new cast based in Miami.

== Context ==
Wakfu takes place in the fictional World of Twelve, a world inhabited by twelve distinct races; however, the show's protagonist, Yugo is later revealed to be part of the 13th, the Eliatropes, who can make portals and have dragon partners. The series follows Yugo, a twelve-year-old boy and his friends, later known as the Brotherhood of the Tofu, who go on adventures while trying to discover who Yugo truly is. The first season follows the group's journey to Oma Island, and later their attempts to stop the villain Nox. The second season focuses on the group's journey to the Crimson Claw Archipelago, and Yugo's attempts to defeat Qilby. The OVAs follow the group six years later, as Dally deals with the fact he is a god while attempting to stop a cataclysmic event known as Ogrest's chaos. Season 3 follows Yugo as he tries to stop a changed Adamaï and a mysterious figure known as Oropo from destroying the world.

The major races of the World of Twelve Include: -The Iops, brazen warriors who often charge into fights without thinking -The Sadida, people with a strong connection to plants (Adidas backwards) -The Cra, people skilled at archery (Arc backwards) -The Enutrof, a people obsessed with money (Fortune backwards) -The Pandawa, a panda-like people who are famous for their milk -The Xelor, a group focused on time (Rolex backwards) -The Eliatropes, an ancient race who can create portals and has dragon companions (Portail backwards without the e's; this is French for portal)

All of these races serve central purposes and have relevant characters throughout the series, though there are others, too. They all serve the central purposes of either being Yugo's friends, central antagonists, or simply people Yugo's group meets on their adventures.

== Series overview ==
Season	Episodes	Originally released	
Season	Episodes	First released	Last released
Specials	4	July 7, 2007	November 17, 2023
1	26	October 30, 2008	June 5, 2010
2	26	February 26, 2011	March 3, 2012
OVAs	3	November 15, 2014	November 29, 2014
3	13	September 2, 2017	September 17, 2017
4	13	February 9, 2024	March 15, 2024

== Episodes ==
=== Specials (2007–23) ===
The specials serve as backstory episodes and follow three different major characters: the first goes back thousands of years to tell the legend of Goultard, the second chronicles the backstory of the first season's main antagonist, Nox, and the third tells the partial story of Ogrest's origin.

No. in series	No. in specials	Title	Animation by	Original release date
Special	1	"Goultard the Barbarian" "Goultard le Barbare"	Ankama Animations	July 7, 2007
Goultard is then only a child but already is endowed with incredible strength. It all starts when he strikes down a Taure in the forest. The village chief, frightened by the reaction of the Taure chief, Mandhal, banished Goultard and his mother Cabotine from the village. Later, Mandhal comes to meet Goultard who sends him flying so high that he lands back in the square of the village in which Goultard had just been banished. He is acclaimed and called a hero. He quickly becomes the most powerful Iop on the planet. Many years have passed and the Iop has a wife and children. But one day he receives a strange letter from a certain Katar who has kidnapped his family. He goes to the meeting place indicated and then realizes that Katar has killed his family. He unleashes his anger on him even to the point of killing him and then leaves the body of the Sacrier, a strange and dark creature. She who possessed Katar's body then takes possession of Goultard's. Since that day, Goultard has been the guardian of the corpses that he himself disembowelled during all these years. He watches over the dead and whoever dares to challenge him regrets it sooner or later.
Special	2	"Noximilien the Clockmaker" "Noximilien l'Horloger"	Doga Kobo and Asahi Production	June 5, 2010
Nearly 200 years before Yugo's birth, Noximilien is just a failed inventor in need of recognition, nevertheless a simple but happy clockmaker with a wife and three children. He is a good father and lucky enough to be loved by his wife Galanthe, who covers him with her affection. But one fine day, everything changes when he discovers a magic cube, the Eliacube, at the bottom of a cave. Intrigued by the artefact, Noximilien decides to study it, rushes into a downward spiral and becomes addicted to its power.
Special	3	"Ogrest the Legend" "Ogrest, la Légende"	Madhouse, DR Movie and Studio Ghibli	April 25, 2011
Yugo's father Alibert tells him a story about the beginning of the legend of Ogrest, from its creation to the awakening of the Dathura doll. Ogrest is an ogre created by an alchemist called Otomaï. He is kind, but clumsy and seems to always destroy everything. He is also in love with Dathura, a doll who can't function because her heart is broken.
Special	4	"Oropo" "Bataille pour l'Eliacube"	Ankama Animations	November 17, 2023
Oropo and his allies go to Oma Island to recover the Eliacube from Grougaloragran and his brother Chibi. Bouillon is obviously the first to volunteer to face the dragon. Unfortunately, the fight does not turn out to his advantage and Eliotrope is killed. Following his death, Oropo decides to run away but they are stopped by Chibi. The fight resumes and it's Chibi and Atone's turn to succumb. Furious, Oropo then begins a violent confrontation against Grougaloragran. In a final attempt to seize the Eliacube, Oropo causes a Wakfu explosion. His spirit finds himself trapped in the object... Once calm returns, Grougaloragran gets rid of the cube while the surviving members of the Brotherhood retreat. Several years pass and Oropo's body rests at the top of his tower, his spirit still absent...

=== Season 1 (2008–10) ===
Season 1 follows Yugo, a kind-hearted 12-year-old boy who accidentally discovers he can create portals, allowing him to transport himself or other people or objects. He, along with his friends, Percedal (a brazen Iop) Eva (a Cra skilled at archery, and Amalia's bodyguard) Amalia (a Sadida, and the princess of the kingdom) and Ruel (a money-hungry Enutrof) go on a journey to Oma Island in an attempt to discover Yugo's origins. The second half of the season follows the group's attempts to stop Nox, a Xelor who wants to send the world back in time to see his family again; however, this will erase all the world's people from existence.

No.	Title	Original release date
1	"The Child from the Mist (Part 1)" "L'enfant des Brumes"	October 30, 2008
Grougaloragran, a mysterious and ancient entity, appears one night with a baby carriage. After defeating a mysterious foe with powers over time, who wants Grougaloragran's life force, or "Wakfu", Grougaloragran comes across Alibert, who is quitting his profession as a bounty hunter after almost taking an innocent man to jail. Grougaloragran leaves the baby carriage with Alibert, believing that he will be a good father to the baby inside. He also leaves a message for the adoptive father, along with a baby Tofu (bird) named Az. 12 years later, Alibert has opened an inn and established a small town called Emelka. The grown up 12-year old boy, now called Yugo, believes himself to be an ordinary boy until he accidentally discovers that he has the ability to create portals. Meanwhile, a monster rampages through town, ending up at his inn. Ruel, who was passing through town, teams up with Yugo, who makes use of his newfound power to defeat the beast. It turns out to have been an Iop possessed by a demon trapped in an item - in this case, a sword known as a Shushu, who is named Rubilax. Alibert, seeing Yugo's power, decides to tell him the truth: that he is adopted and his real family is out there somewhere.
2	"Yugo the Eliatrope (Part 2)" "Yugo L'Eliatrope"	October 31, 2008
The village is attacked by Polters, creatures that turn humans into shrubs. Yugo and Ruel, along with their new companion, Sir Percedal of Sadlygrove, (Dally for short), go to the Forbidden Forest to find out what caused the attack. Inside, they run into two ladies on a pilgrimage from their home kingdom, Amalia Sheran Sharm and her bodyguard, Evangelyne, who join them on their journey. Along the way, the group encounters the ruler of the forest, the Soft Oak, who plans to turn all humans into trees in revenge for the destruction his forest has suffered. Amalia convinces Soft Oak that not all humans are evil and that only free people can protect the forests. She then heals him with magic and he agrees to turn the shrubs back into humans. Later when returning to Emelka, Yugo, Alibert, and the others are attacked by the time villain from 12 years ago, now revealed to be a Xelor named Nox. Nox manipulates time to age Alibert rapidly and then calls Yugo an Eliatrope, swearing to get Yugo's Wakfu one day. Alibert, knowing that Yugo deserves to know the truth, tells him that his real family, the Eliatrope race, are out there somewhere at a place called Oma Island. Yugo's friends agree to help him find his real family and they set off on their adventure.
3	"The Black Crow" "Le Corbeau Noir"	October 31, 2008
The group goes to Kelba Market in search of a map to begin their quest. When they arrive, they find the marketplace under attack by a mysterious figure known as the Black Crow. The groups learns about a shop run by Kabrok, an old adventurer who hung up his cape and became a stock boy, and Miranda, who is Kabrok's strict but loving wife. They have a map the group can buy, but find themselves to sell it thanks to the Black Crow's attacks. The heroes lay a trap for the Black Crow and are able to take him down. The Black Crow is revealed to be Kabrok, who was bored with his life, craved adventure again, and felt that attacking the local merchants was the way to get it. Kabrok and his wife sell the group a map - a Shushu named Skribble.
4	"The Ugly Pageant" "Miss Moche"	October 31, 2008
Lost, the group finds themselves in front of a tower belonging to four sisters who wish to find the perfect husband. Percedal, completely smitten just by the top of one of their heads, climbs up to get a kiss. When he gets to the top, he finds that the sisters are actually ugly because of a curse that Osamodas put on them after the picky girls had been rejected every single suitor. To be cured, one of them must be kissed by a man, and they hold Percedal captive until they get their kiss. The group dons disguises to get inside the tower. The nine of them decide to hold a little contest to see who will get the kiss from Percedal, which ends up being pure torture. Things quickly go wrong when Eva, who is the prettiest of all of them but labeled the ugliest among the sisters, enrages the sisters and causes them to attack the group. Freeing Dally, the group flees with the aid of one of the sisters, who believes they got what they deserved and is sorry for what they did to Dally. As they flee, Dally blows the sister a kiss, which turns the sisters and their tower back to normal.
5	"The Magnificent Five" "Les 5 Magnifiques"	January 28, 2009
The group comes across a village of Puddlies, cephalopod-like gelatinous creatures that turn into puddles. They are constantly attacked by a pack of Taures Bullies, wild bovine beasts that constantly raid their village for food. The group manages to fight them off, but know they will return as they always have. Not wanting to turn a blind eye to turmoil, and needing food themselves, the group decides to help train the Puddlies so they can be ready for the next raid. The Bullies attack again, but the group, along with the Puddlies, quickly overpower them. However, the Bullies brought one of their leaders - their father, Mandhal the Mighty. He proves to be a tough foe, and even has his own beam attack, but Yugo uses his portal to deflect Father's beam attack back at him. With Father defeated, and worry about Mother finding out taking over, the Bullies flee, leaving the Puddlies to live in peace.
6	"Vampyro"	February 15, 2009
With no other route to take, the group is forced to pass through an inhospitable town full of decay and zombie-like townsfolk. Vampyro, a vampire, comes to claim Eva as his wife, by using a magical ring to take her “shadow” (her soul). The group launches a rescue mission, avoiding ghouls launched by Vampyro. They soon reach his castle and begin climbing it, but the group is overrun by vampire bats. Percedal volunteers to stay behind while the others go to rescue Eva. They arrive and find that Vampyro is using Eva's body as a vessel for his true love, Shadofang. Vampyro uses his shadow stealing powers on Ruel, turning him into a beast that Amalia eventually defeats. Amalia, Yugo, and Percedal fight Vampyro, but he proves to be too powerful. However, during the fight, they discover his weakness: he's allergic to Az. The group uses Az to their advantage, overpowering Vampyro and removing his ring. He turns back to his original self, a magistrate named Wagner, while the town and its people are returned to normal. The shadows of Eva and Ruel are also returned, and the group soon leaves the town.
7	"Poisonous Beauty" "Vénéneuse"	February 21, 2009
After running away from a group of angry savages, Amalia is bitten by a poisonous Red Rose, causing her to collapse and become extremely sick with seemingly no cure. Ruel says that his old friend, an Eniripsa named Nausica, lives nearby and can help heal her. She tells them that the only cure to a Red Rose bite is sap from the rare Severum tree, which is located deep in the nearby Maleficent Forest. Ruel and Yugo leave to gather the sap while Percedal and Eva stay behind to help care for Amalia. Not long after Ruel and Yugo leave, Amalia's doll goes berserk, attacking Nausica, Percedal, and Eva. It merges with Rubilax, turning into a monstrous demon. The trio overpower it, forcing Rubilax out and cutting the doll up into pieces, but the pieces turn into other dolls and attack in masses. In the forest, Ruel and Yugo are attacked by giant Venus flytraps, but are saved by a forest dweller named Sybannak. They are forced to help her in exchange for the sap, but when the tasks become tedious and monotonous, Ruel instead decides to steal some sap. Enraged due to wanting the sap for herself, Sybannak attacks them with the Venus flytrap monsters. Rue and Yugo escape with the sap and return to Nausica's where they save Amalia and return the dolls back to normal.
8	"Xav the Baker" "Xav' le Boulanger"	February 28, 2009
Following a delicious smell, the group finds a man attacking a beast made entirely out of bread. They mistake the man for the attacker, only to later find out that the man, an innocent baker named Xav, was attacked by Breadnaughts who were after the rare Golden Wheat stored in his barn. Before the attack, Xav was going to enter a bread baking contest with the special wheat which is thought to produce exquisite bread. Wanting to fix their mistake, Yugo decides to help Xav make the bread while the others harvest the wheat. They enter the competition and with Yugo's help, Xav wins. The Breadnaught soon attacks again, and after a short battle the Breadnaught inadvertently reveals that she is Chouquette, Xav's father's former apprentice, and that she was after the wheat because she is in love with her master and wanted him to win.
9	"Ruel's Bag" "Le sac de Ruel"	March 7, 2009
The group is staying at Xav's place, and getting some tips on how to deal with Skribble from its original master: Xav's father, Ratweasel. A traveling herald named Rich McDeek passes through and tells the group that kamas, gold coins serving as the land's currency, are being stolen throughout the land. Ruel, afraid his own kamas will be stolen, retreats into his magical bag, and uses a recall potion to return home. The others, McDeek included, follow after him. They discover his home is built into a clay mesa and has a special code, which is the theme song of the show Sur Tes Pas, to keep intruders out and keep his stash of Kamas hidden. McDeek reveals himself to be a shapeshifting genie that turns into whatever he eats, and since he eats kamas, he's as hard as gold. He overpowers the group and eats more kamas. Ruel, desperate not to give up his kamas, tricks him into eating chocolate coins instead. McDeek eats them and turns into chocolate, so Ruel traps him inside a glass vase and leaves McDeek in his vault.
10	"The Gobbowl Inferno - Part 1" "L'enfer du Boufbowl - 1"	March 14, 2009
Upon arriving to the port city of Bonta, Yugo & the gang try to hire a boat to take them to Oma Island, but the local owners either believe it doesn't exist, find this a waste of time, or refuse to chase after a cursed island. They try to buy a boat from a fisherman sympathetic to their story, but it's too expensive for Ruel to buy. So Ruel, not wanting to spend any kamas, enters them in a gobbowl match with his venerated team, Real Gobbly, against professional player Kriss Krass & his battleharded team, Lamechester United. However, the old, weary members of Real Gobbly are not intent on teaming up with Ruel, as he left them to become a Bounty Hunter, but Ruel and the crew are able to make amends with the team and join up and receive some basic training before the game.
11	"The Gobbowl Inferno - Part 2" "L'enfer du Boufbowl - 2"	March 21, 2009
Ruel & his team, Real Gobbly, along with Percedal, with Yugo, Amalia, and Eva relegated to being cheerleaders, play against their opposing team, Lamechester United, led by professional gobbowl player, Kriss Krass in a special game of gobbowl - a game where the goal is to reach the opponents territory to score points (similar to rugby), while also using special, powered up equipment to boost movement or power (with limited charges). Things don't go well as Lamechester begins using cheap tricks to get the upper hand. Kriss Krass insists on showboating to show off to the crowd, thinking about how he'll look cool to his fans over playing the actual game, which gets worse and worse as the match goes on as he cares too much about making sure the fans get a good show. Due to their age, the senior members of Real Gobbly get badly injured, forcing them out of the rest of the game and forcing Ruel to bring in Yugo, Amalia, and Eva.
12	"The Gobbowl Inferno - Part 3" "L'enfer du Boufbowl - 3"	March 28, 2009
With Real Gobbly's senior members being forced out due to injuries brought on by Kriss Krass and his team, Ruel substitutes in Yugo, who is excited to be in the game, Amalia, who's also excited but intimidated by the size of some of the players, and Eva, who couldn't care less but whose beauty infatuates Jay of Kriss Krass's team, turning him into a motionless statue. Though he feels the girls won't be as valued of players as his old team was, they prove to be just as useful as the senior members, if not better, although Yugo immediately wastes the charge of his equipment. They're so good, the crowd and Kriss Krass' own cheerleaders begin to cheer for them, causing Kriss Krass to become infuriated. He bribes the referee and announcer, giving his team free rein to cheat for four minutes, but Amalia is able to use Jay's infatuation of Eva to take out some of his own teammates, letting Real Gobbly score the final, tying point, causing overtime. In overtime, all plays have unlimited charge in their equipment, making the final point all the more hectic. After a while, Yugo and Kriss Krass fight over the ball, with Kriss Krass seemingly about to win, but his showboating gets the better of him, allowing Percedal to claim the ball and score the winning point with Yugo, winning the game for Real Gobbly and becoming permanent legends of the Bonta field. With their winnings, they buy the fisherman's boat and heading off to Oma.
13	"Calm Blue Sea" "Calme bleu"	April 18, 2009
Now with a new ship, Yugo & his friends set a course for Oma Island. The boys and girls gamble every day with dice to see who gets to cook and clean the ship, with the girls usually being the ones doing the work due to Ruel rigging their dice. That night, things turn spooky as a lone arachnee, a spider-like creature, sneaks on board, is then possessed by Skribble, and is picking everyone off one by one. However, Yugo is able to barter with Skribble-- if he helps him find his family he'll become the map's guardian, like how Dally is to Rubilax. Skribble agrees and dispossesses the arachnee, letting the spider and his friends go free. Meanwhile, in his clock fortress, Nox has a dream about his past where his drive to absorb all the Wakfu he can is revealed - he had a wife and children, but they were killed by a cataclysmic event known as Ogrest's Chaos. He hopes a mysterious cube known as the Eliacube he has will reverse time far back enough to prevent their deaths. He and his clock fortress travel back to Emelka and siphons all the Wakfu from the Soft Oak, killing it, the Polters, and the forest it protected. He also visits Alibert and restores him back to normal, saying he apologizes for what he's about to do to the World of Twelve.
14	"Moon Island" "L'île de Moon"	June 20, 2009
After a bad run-in with a storm, Yugo and friends are shipwrecked on Moon island, inhabited by a tribal race called Kanniballs, who kidnap Yugo, Eva and Amalia for sacrifice to their god. Now it is up to Dally, Ruel and Az to save them and the islanders from their corrupt leader, Saul, and return exiled ruler Botan Ficus. With the help of their benevolent god Moon, a monkey as smart as a human with godly powers and control over a mighty hammer that can summon towers of tiki totems, they set off to return Botan back to his rightful place on the throne. Saul is able to claim the hammer and command overwhelming power because of it, but Botan and Amalia, who had been lamenting the inevitable end of the journey before they arrived, are able to outsmart him and reclaim the hammer, defeating him by sending him into the stratosphere on a giant tiki totem. The Kanniballs help repair their ship and point them in the direction of Oma.
15	"Adamai (Part 1)" "Adamaï"	June 20, 2009
After being attacked by a Kralove, a vicious kraken monster, Yugo & friends are shipwrecked on Oma Island washing up on the beach. However, Yugo & Az have been separated from the others, and are stuck on the other side of the island. Eva, Dally, Amalia & Ruel fight the same Kralove from before, defeating it by cutting its tentacles, while Yugo meets a mysterious creature named Adamaï during his wanders through the forest, and Adamaï tells him he has information about him and his family.
16	"The Eliacube (Part 2)" "L'Eliacube"	November 28, 2009
Eva, Dally, Amalia & Ruel venture into a deep, dark cave where they encounter Grougaloragran the Dragon. Grougal mistakes their intent as malevolent and almost kills them, but he soon realizes they have good intentions and lets them go. Meanwhile, Yugo, Az & Adamaï play a game of tag, where if Yugo wins Adamaï will tell him all he knows. Yugo soon wins, and Adamaï tells him he is one of the Eliatropes, and that they are brothers since they came from the same Dofus. They soon search for Yugo's friends, but stumble onto a nefarious plot schemed by Nox, discovering he plans to invade the island and take all of Grougal's Wakfu.
17	"Grougaloragran the Eternal (Part 3)" "Grougaloragran l'éternel"	December 5, 2009
Grougal realizes what about happen and, ignoring the group's protest, saves their lives by sending the group to shelter in the North, allowing Grougal and Nox to do battle without any interference or risk to others. Grougal makes easy work of all of Nox's minions, but Nox soon takes Grougal himself. They do battle, and it ends up close, but soon Nox traps Grougal by using his abilities to stop time and takes all of his Wakfu, leaving his fate unknown, although Adamaï senses a bad outcome and takes on a look of despair.
18	"The Brotherhood of the Tofu" "La Confrérie du Tofu"	December 12, 2009
Now that Nox believes he has all the Wakfu he needs, his plan to drain the Tree of Life has been set into motion. In order to stop him, the Brotherhood of the Tofu is formed, consisting of all of Yugo's group's members, and using one of Az's feathers as their symbol. The group decides to split up. Yugo, Az & Adamai begin to cross the ocean, attempting to head south to the island where Grougal's Dofus is kept - since Grougal has died, he has reincarnated in the Dofus as part of the Eliatropes' life cycle. as well as train to improve their powers. Meanwhile, Ruel, Percedal, Eva and Amalia head towards the Sadida Kingdom to warn the king, who happens to be Amalia's father, about Nox's sadistic scheme. They brave mountains of snow and an avalanche and soon find themselves at their destination.
19	"The Sadida Kingdom" "Le Royaume Sadida"	December 19, 2009
Amalia, Eva, Dally & Ruel have arrived in the Sadida Kingdom, Amalia's homeland, full of lush plants and life. They enter the palace of the King, Oakheart Sheran Sharm, to warn him about the incoming attack on the Tree of Life, but find that the king is not there. Instead, they run into Amalia's elder brother, Armand, who is substituting as king for his father while he is in meditation at the Tree of Life. Armand has been feuding with Amalia since they were little, and tension quickly builds between the two sides. Later, Dally accidentally ends up feuding with the royal guard and is soon challenged to a battle against Armand. However, when he gets severely beaten, Rubilax manipulates Dally in his anger to take control of him, causing him to wipe out the royal guard but also resulting in his immediate disgrace. Realizing what he has done, he heads towards the desert in shame.
20	"The Tree of Life" "L'Arbre de vie"	January 9, 2010
After the events of the previous episode, Percedal has gone missing, and Ruel has been thrown in prison, although he soon escapes. In an attempt to resolve the conflict, Eva & Amalia, with some assistance from the newly appeared Master Joris, the King's close advisor and friend, head to the Sadida Kingdom's Tree of Life, to find Amalia's father, King Oakheart. They want to convince him that they did nothing wrong, and to prepare for war since Nox is coming. However, when they arrive, Amalia suddenly disappears. Eva tries looking for her, following her to the Tree of Life, but she unknowingly finds herself in an endless dreamscape. She soon finds herself going through a series of euphoric hallucinations, but then realizes they are fake and shuts them out. She is then able to find Amalia, who is with the King, who has seen visions of the incoming attack.
21	"Igol" "Igôle"	January 16, 2010
Yugo, Adamai and Az finally arrive on the island where Grougaloragran hides his Dofus; however, they first have to cross an extremely dry desert to reach their destination. Adamaï uses this to his advantage and begins to train Yugo to help him use Wakfu properly. Meanwhile, Igol, Nox's vicious bow-wow, also arrives on the island, hunting for its new prey: Adamaï. Igol can move at the speed of light and soon catches up to the two, attacking Adamaï and leaving him stuck in Tofu form, as Yugo learns to channel his Wakfu to see the Wakfu of others. He cannot see Igol due to his speed, but uses his Wakfu to find him and trap him under a bundle of rocks. With Igol gone Yugo and Adamaï head towards the town where the Dofus is located.
22	"Rubilax"	January 23, 2010
Following the events of "The Sadida Kingdom", Percedal has headed for the desert and resigned from being a Shushu Guardian. He buries Rubilax at the desert's edge and aimlessly wanders the desert. After almost dying of thirst, he winds up at the grave of his late Master Goultard, who, unexpectedly, ends up being resurrected. Goultard convinces Dally to regain his honor and title as a Shushu Guardian by fighting Rubilax in his true Shushu form, and defeating him. They battle, and Rubilax takes advantage of his power, which allows him to increase in size each time he is it. Dally falls for this initially, but soon uses this to his advantage by tripping Rubilax up, allowing him to bury Rubilax in the sand. Rubilax transforms back into a sword, and Dally leaves the desert to return to his friends.
23	"The Quest for the Dofus" "La quête du Dofus"	March 20, 2010
Yugo, Adamai and Az finally arrive at the town holding the secret sanctuary where Grougaloragran keeps his Dofus hidden, as well as meet the keeper who guards it. They try to find the hidden sanctuary, but since Adamaï is stuck in Tofu form no one believes him. He soon finds a little girl, however, who helps him transform back into a dragon, allowing him to enter the sanctuary with Yugo. Yugo discovers that he must battle a giant stone creature that guards it in order to get it, and soon uses his portals to defeat it. Meanwhile, Igol comes back, and continues to hunt down Adamai; however, the same little girl from before meets him and helps Igol sees his soft side. She takes him in as Yugo and Adamaï leave with Grougal's Dofus.
24	"Reunion" "Retrouvailles"	June 5, 2010
Yugo and Adamai have obtained Grougaloragran's Dofus, and make their way to the Sadida Kingdom to join their friends. Meanwhile, the Kingdom of Sadida readies for war, developing a plan to try to stop Nox from reaching the Tree of Life; however, Nox is one step ahead and readies a machine to counter it. Adamaï and Yugo finally reunite with their friends, as each side explains what they've learned and Nox's army is seen off in the distance.
25	"I Am a Legend (Part 1)" "J'entre dans la légende"	June 5, 2010
Nox and his army arrive at the Sadida Kingdom and begin to charge towards their target, the Tree of Life and its Wakfu. The Brotherhood of the Tofu, now reunited, along with the Sadida Kingdom's warriors, go on the offensive to stop him and his giant clock from reaching the tree, easily defeating most of his army. Yugo and Adamai are able to infiltrate Nox's Clock, his army's central fortress, while everyone else engages Nox's latest creation, XII Raze-time, which is wiping out the Sadida army. The machine overpowers them, and Percedal sacrifices himself to try to stop it, but he fails, subsequently dying. It is later destroyed by Ruel and Master Joris. After sensing Dally's death, Yugo launches into a rage while he finds the Eliacube, as Nox's Clock reaches the Tree of Life and begins draining its Wakfu.
26	"Mount Zinit (Part 2)" "Le Mont Zinit"	June 5, 2010
Enraged by Percedal's death, Yugo and Adamai face Nox to avenge Dally and stop the attack. However, they find him as the Tree of Life is drained, causing the Sadida race to begin dying. The brothers fight Nox and soon overpower him. Yugo attempts to access the Eliacube, finding himself drawn to it, but when he touches it they are teleported to a lonely mountain. Yugo and Nox battle, but because of a brief interruption by Ogrest, Nox traps Yugo and drains him of all his Wakfu, rendering him almost inert. Meanwhile, the Tree of Life has almost been fully drained, so Nox uses all his stored Wakfu and succeeds in going back in time, but all the Wakfu Nox has collected is only enough to go back twenty minutes. This takes them to before the Tree's destruction, reviving all the Sadidas, but right after Dally's death. The Clock falls apart, since it was powered by Nox's stored Wakfu. The Sadidas move to finish Nox off, only to be stopped by Yugo, as he recognizes that despite all the destruction, Nox had good intentions and the battle is already over. Nox bids Yugo farewell before teleporting away in despair, although he thanks him. The Sadida people rebuild their kingdom and erect a statue in Percedal's memory. Yugo and the others stand at the foot of Dally's statue, paying their respects.

=== Season 2 (2011–12) ===
Season 2 follows the Brotherhood as they meet another Eliatrope, Qilby, who tells them they must head to the Crimson Claw Archipelago on the other side of the world to find the rest of the Eliatropes. They also confront the king of the Shushus, and Adamaï stays behind with Qilby, discovering his motives in the process - he seeks to destroy the Eliatropes as revenge for trapping him in eternal prison years ago. However, this motive soon changes, and the season ends with a climactic battle between four different sides on the archipelago.

No. overall	No. in season	Title	Original release date
27	1	"Monsters and Chimeras (Part 1)" "Monstres et chimères"	February 26, 2011
A few months have passed since the end of season one. The Brotherhood has settled down in the Sadida Kingdom, and accepted life without Dally - except for Eva, who sits by Dally's statue every day, wishing he could return. One day, while Eva sits by Dally's statue, drawing a picture of him in her book chronicling his adventures, she suddenly hears the statue talking to him. She believes she's hallucinating, but she soon accepts that his voice his real as Dally tells Eva to find him in a previously unknown place known as Rubilaxia. Meanwhile, Ruel angers an underground monster while attempting to find gold, causing a giant electric monster to rise from the underground up, going on a rampage and attacking nearby farms. Yugo and Adamaï team up to defeat it by using underground tunnels to push it up from below and defeat it up above. Eva grabs Skribble, and leaves to find Rubilaxia without telling anyone after she cuts her own hair.
28	2	"Rubilaxia (Part 2)"	March 5, 2011
Eva continues looking for Percedal, but she soon gets lost and wonders if she hallucinated Dally's voice. She is then lured from her path by hearing Dally's voice, who tells her to "follow the wind" to lead her to him. However, her journey is interrupted when she comes across a crumbling village, where she meets a mysterious old lady. She tells her that the nearby towns have been absorbed by Rubilaxia, and her village will be next. She then points her in the direction of Rubilaxia. Meanwhile, she is targeted by a Rogue named Remington Smisse, and his bow-meow brother, Grany.
29	3	"Remington Smisse (Part 3)"	March 12, 2011
Remington confronts Eva near Rubilaxia, and fighters her, declaring he wants Rubilax for his own - he is a Shushu hunter, and devotes himself to their collection. Eva steals some of Remington's weapons, but Eva soon finds herself cornered. Eva is trapped and taken to Rubilaxia. She finds that Dally's soul is trapped in Rubilax's captive body, while Rubilax has taken Dally's body as his own, meaning they have trapped each other. She soon uses her position to her advantage and is able to free Dally, but Rubilax does not want to let them go.
30	4	"The Return of Percedal (Part 4)" "Le retour de Pinpin"	March 19, 2011
Yugo, Amalia, and Ruel use one of Eva's special arrows to teleport to her location. However, Rubilax kidnaps Yugo, and turns Amalia and Ruel into ghouls. His plan is to show and tell the Lord of the Shushus, King Rushu, a way to invade and conquer the World of Twelve: Yugo and his portals. However, when Rubilax speaks with King Rushu, Eva and Dally team up to convince Rushu Rubilax is on the humans' side, confusing Rubilax's emotions. Soon, Rubilax realizes he wants to stay with Dally, and Rubilax cancels his plan and heads back to the Sadida Kingdom with the Brotherhood, angering Rushu.
31	5	"The Dragon Pig" "Le Dragon-Cochon"	March 26, 2011
After saving Dally, the Brotherhood of the Tofu heads back to the Sadida Kingdom, but Yugo, Dally and Ruel find themselves overwhelmed by hunger. A baby piglet soon wanders by, and, against the protest of the girls, the boys cook the pig and eat it. This angers the lord of the pigs, The Dragon Pig. As revenge, the Dragon Pig kidnaps Ruel, and takes him to his underground fortress - a labyrinth full of traps. Entering the labyrinth and almost immediately falling for a trap, Yugo, Eva and Amalia are turned into pigs. However, Dally is able to use his knowledge of traps to safely head through the whole dungeon and battle the Dragon Pig. They do battle, and end up tying, but the Dragon Pig ends up respecting Dally so much that he turns his friends back to normal and lets them go.
32	6	"Qilby"	April 2, 2011
After returning to the Sadida Kingdom, Yugo and Adamai use the Eliacube and Grougaloragran's Dofus in an attempt to discover the truth about their origins. After doing this, a white light fills the room, and they find a hatched baby Grougal, his Eliatrope twin brother Chibi, and a mysterious man named Qilby, Grougal and Chibi are Yugo and Adamai's younger brothers while Qilby is their older brother. Qilby tells them that he is the king of the Eliatropes, and that his Dofus lies at the Crimson Claw Archipelago on the other side of the world. He also says that the key to finding the rest of the Eliatropes lies on these islands; however, the Sadidas are suspicious of his sudden appearance and claims. Yugo believes him, however, so he and the Brotherhood set off for the archipelago - except for Adamaï, who stays behind to watch Chibi, after his older brother Yugo kissed him on his forehead, and Grougal together with Albert.
33	7	"Ambush" "Guet-apens"	April 9, 2011
Due to Qilby's revelations, the Brotherhood begins their journey to the archipelago. They begin their journey by taking a shortcut: via cable car; which happens to be run by Ruel's long-lost grandmother. However, the cable car descends very slowly, so three Rogues take the opportunity to ambush the car. The Brotherhood fights them off: Yugo uses his portals, Dally leaps onto a bird to take control of it, and Eva uses her arrows. They tie the Rogues up as the cable car reaches the bottom, allowing the Brotherhood to safely continue on their journey.
34	8	"The Justice Knight (Part 1)" "Chevalier justice"	April 16, 2011
Continuing their journey, Percedal is upset that Rubilax hasn't been talking to him since Rubilaxia. Later, in the middle of the night, the group, along with Remington Smisse and his brother Grany, have been abducted by a mysterious golden train, owned by the Justice Knight, a Shushu guardian. The gang and Remington work together to bust out of his prison at his tower, while dealing with a new Shushu threat: Anathar, a Shushu that can copy anyone's powers; and that demon happens to be in possession of Justice Knight's father.
35	9	"The World of Rushu (Part 2)" "Le monde de Rushu"	April 30, 2011
After the fight against Anathar, Yugo, Percedal, Rubilax, Grany and Remington are pulled in with him to the dark realm of the Shushus, the Shukrute. They come face-to-face with Rushu, King of the Shushus, who plans to kill all except Yugo, whom he needs to create a portal for him to invade the World of Twelve. To prevent this, Rubilax demands a game of "rush", where they have to fight for their lives in a battle royale against hundreds of Shushus, and hope not to perish in the process. Meanwhile, Adamai and Qilby sense this, and try to create a portal for the guys, and help them escape.
36	10	"Kriss Krass (Part 1)" "Kriss la Krass"	June 4, 2011
The adventurers' journey takes them to the city of Brakmar, home to Gobbowl -- but also to thieves, con artists and other nefarious types. While there, they search for Kriss Krass, who has been placed on trial playing Bontarian gobbowl with Lamechester United. Kriss is about to be sentenced to execution, until Yugo intervenes the trial to defend him. Yugo then calls out Brkamar's greatest gobbowl player, The Masked Gobbowler, and challenges him to a game of gobbowl for Kriss' life.
37	11	"The Masked Gobbowler (Part 2)" "Le Boufbowler masqué"	June 11, 2011
In order to save Kriss, the heroes must play a legendary match against the brutal Brak'n'Black team and their leader, the Masked Gobbowler. Little do they know, the Masked Gobbowler is hiding what would be known as one of the biggest scandals in Brakmar...
38	12	"The Emporg (Part 3)" "Le Emporg"	June 18, 2011
After the Masked Gobbowler is revealed to be a woman, notably Maude, Kriss' old gobbowl mentor/lover, she, Kriss, and the brotherhood are sentenced to execution by beheading. But the Brak n' Black team demand revenge by a rematch of gobbowl, as well as an extra player; the Emporg, one of the greatest and most powerful gobbowl players who ever lived. Later in the match, Ruel discovers and reveals a shocking secret about the Emporg that could bring the very destruction of Brakmar... and them along with it.
39	13	"The Night of the Thirsters" "La Nuit des Soiffards"	October 29, 2011
The adventurers make their way to the valley of Pandalucia, known for its natural beauty, along with its milk and alcohol. However, when they reach it, they find it devastated and deserted. They look around to see what has happened, only to suddenly be ambushed by zombies. They bite everyone, turning them into zombies - except for Amalia, who manages to escape. She meets Don Pedro, one of the last remaining pandawas, who explains that the contaminated water supply has caused all the pandawas to turn into zombies, and the only way to turn them back is to use the pandawas' special milk. Making their way to the last storehouse of it, run by Jack Pandaniels, they are able to successfully turn everyone back into normal. The adventurers are given the remaining milk supply and leave the valley.
40	14	"The Voice Thief" "Le Voleur de Voix"	November 5, 2011
Yugo and his team stop in the town of Mashville for the night, ending up staying in an inn run by Ruel's old friend, Phil Harmonic, along with his nephew Albert. Phil is holding a talent show at the inn, but a mysterious masked voice thief is using a strange contraption to steal the voices of the participants. However, Yugo's team decides to participate, anyway, and Amalia's voice is soon stolen. They interrogate all talent show participants, but get nowhere, so they decide to lure out the voice thief by having Eva sing at the talent show. It works, and Yugo soon captures the voice thief - Albert, who was tired of the passive life Phil was living.
41	15	"Wabbit Island" "L'île des Wabbits"	November 12, 2011
When they land on the island of the Wabbits, the heroes meet Wa Wabbit, the former ruler who's on a personal quest to return to the throne.
42	16	"The Cursed Fountain" "La Fontaine Maudite"	November 19, 2011
Thirsty and exhausted, the heroes make their way through a barren wasteland to a fountain, only to find it cursed and guarded by a fearsome warrior.
43	17	"The Council of Twelve" "Le Conseil des Douze"	November 26, 2011
Each class of the World of the Twelve sends a delegate to the kingdom of Sadida, where they plan to discuss what will become of the Eliatropes.
44	18	"Cleome" "Cléophée"	December 3, 2011
The adventurers arrive at the Trool Fair theme park on Ga Ga Island, where they encounter the larva races, the GladiaTrool Arena and more. Yugo and his friends meets Cleome, who is Eva's younger sister.
45	19	"A Fistful of Kamas" "Pour une Poignée de Kamas"	December 10, 2011
The adventurers finally arrive at Rogue-controlled Haven Port, and begin their search for a ship they can sail to Crimson Claw Archipelago. However, all the ships are too expensive for Ruel's liking - until he finds a run-down ship, own by pirates Black Ink and Elaine. However, Ruel gets in trouble with the town's pirates after protecting Black Ink and Elaine from the pirates, so they declare that the Brotherhood will have to fight them for the ship. Yugo and company arrive at the pirates' lair, where the captain declares the Brotherhood will have to compete in series of games to win the ship. They succeed, and soon the final game is announced - shooting, specifically falling gold coins. The captain misses a few, but Yugo is blindfolded and uses his ability to sense Wakfu to win. The Brotherhood, Black Ink and Elaine take the ship and sail to the archipelago.
46	20	"The Zinit" "Le Zinit"	January 14, 2012
The adventurers set sail on Black Ink's ship for the final leg of their journey, and Qilby, Adamai and Grougaloragran discover the Zinith ship.
47	21	"Bellaphone Island" "L'île des Bellaphones"	January 21, 2012
The group ends up shipwrecked, dangling on the precipice of a strange island. After making their way down safely, they discover mysterious, siren-like creatures known as Bellaphones. The boys (even Az) become infatuated with them to the point of rejecting everything the girls say, so the group goes their separate ways. Later, the Bellaphones reveal their true form - monkey-like creatures - and decide they are going to turn the boys into Bellaphones, too. The girls realize this and head off to save the boys, and soon manage to turn them back to normal. They then head off the island, even though Ruel still remains infatuated with the creatures.
48	22	"The Silence of the Rings" "Le Silence des Anneaux"	January 28, 2012
After Ruel fakes a heart attack, the group ends up on the island of Breta. Ruel immediately goes to search for treasure using a map that he has, but is unable to find it, instead finding a mysterious ring. The group ends up having to head into town to gather food for the final stretch of their journey, but it turns out that most of the food is useless due to the governor's order to stamp everything. They soon realize the governor's tyranny is the source of the town's problems and head off to depose him. After a battle, the governor is defeated and it is revealed the ring contains the spirit of a woman, who the governor previously trapped as he was jealous after she was married to another man. The woman takes over, bringing peace to the island, Ruel finally finds what he was looking for - an old trading card worth thousands of kamas - and the group leaves the island, heading on the final stretch of their journey.
49	23	"The Crimson Claws" "Les Griffes Pourpres"	February 11, 2012
Yugo and his fellow heroes reach Crimson Claws Island, which is under siege by bombs made with advanced technology.
50	24	"Phaeris the Mighty" "Phaéris le Puissant"	February 18, 2012
Rushu and his wicked minions have brought the World of the Twelve to its knees, and the ultimate battle unfolds on the island. As Qilby becomes more evil, Yugo loses his patience in front of him and screams at him as he stops him to finish this in the battle.
51	25	"The White Dimension" "La Dimension Blanche"	February 25, 2012
Yugo must keep a backstabbing Eliatrope from activating the Zinith ship amid the raging battle on Crimson Claws Island.
52	26	"The Eliatropes" "Le Peuple Eliatrope"	March 3, 2012
The war for the Crimson Claws continues. With the Zapp to the Shushu dimension closing, time is running out to stop the Shushu invasion. Goultard tells Percedal that he still has much to see in do, ending his statement with "daddy" before launching into battle. While Percedal tries to figure out what his master meant by "daddy", he is able to deduce she is pregnant before she is taken a hostage at gunpoint by Remington. Cleo arrives to save her sister, but Eva is shot in the shoulder. Percedal gives Remington a hard punch and Granny a hard kick, launching them into the sea. He asks Eva if they can take a break from adventuring to try out parenting, which she agrees to. Meanwhile, Yugo discovers the Eliatrope children in the alternate dimension Qilby described protected by a dragon named Baltazar. Qilby brags that he will make the Eliatrope race into what it once was and explore the Krosmoz once more. Yugo, sick of this talk about supposed destiny, deduces that Qilby is doing all this because he is afraid of being alone again, evidenced that he had plenty of opportunities to kill them, but did not, as well as his desire for his sister Shinonome. Qilby grows in anger and launches at him. The final battle erupts as Yugo and the Eliatrope children battle their true enemy- the traitor Qilby.

=== Original Video Animations (2014) ===
The Original Video Animations serve as a bridge between seasons 2 and 3 and follow Yugo's group several years after the end of season 2 as they try to stop Ogrest's Chaos, a cataclysmic event used as a plot device, while Adamaï is lured towards the darkness by new friends and Dally deals with the sudden revelation that he is a god.

No. in series	No. in OVAs	Title	Original release date
OVA	1	"The Quest for the Six Dofus Eliatropes - Book 1: The Throne of Ice" "La Quête des Six Dofus Éliatropes - Livre 1: Le Trone de Glace"	November 15, 2014
Six years have passed since the battle with Qilby and the Shushu Race. Yugo and Adamai work at Alibert's Inn, which has become famous with Yugo and his friends saving the world multiple times. Az had settled down with female Tofu with babies of his own, while Yugo is wrestling with his growing romantic feelings for Amalia. Ruel is still a bounty hunter, while Junior reached maturity and is a big and burly Phorror, with both capable of merging together. Percedal and Eva are living a quiet life with twin children—a girl named Elely and a boy named Flopin. Percedal keeps trying to ask Eva to marry him, but keeps getting interrupted every time. All this peace is brought on its face when they receive word from Otomai, a 5000-year-old alchemist who is in the current employ of the Sadidas, that the Sadida Kingdom is in danger of being wiped off the map thanks to a massive flood caused by Ogrest, a powerful demi-god Ogre created by Otomai. Amalia, who is also wrestling with romantic feelings for Yugo, agrees to an arranged marriage with a Xelor count who lives in the arctic, something Percedal finds insulting to the sanctity of marriage because of his attempts to propose to Eva. Even knowing it is not right, Amalia still agrees to it for the sake of her people, but the Count has other plans for the Sadida kingdom. The group travels to the Arctic and meets with the Count, who shows them a hidden forest under the ice, stating it will be perfect for the Sadida people. When he and Amalia depart to wed, his goons take the rest captive and reveal their true plan: the Count plans to use the Sadida Kingdom's trees to heat his palace. Elely and Flopin arrive and fight the goons and free the others, allowing Yugo to go and warn Amalia. The leader of the goons take Elely and Flopin hostage, and threaten to throw them into molten magma and this sends Percedal into an advanced state of being. He effortlessly overpowers the goon leader and saves his children. Eva, knowing about Percedal's repeated attempts at a proposal, says this is the perfect time. After six long years, Percedal finally asks Eva to marry him, which she happily says yes to. Meanwhile, Yugo is able to get to the wedding and warns Amalia of the Count's plans. The Count attempts to freeze him but Amalia and Yugo overpower him.
OVA	2	"The Quest for the Six Dofus Eliatropes - Book 2: Ush" "La Quête des Six Dofus Éliatropes - Livre 2: Ush"	November 22, 2014
While checking out the Count's trophy room, which contains some old relics of Nox, including his special telescope, as well as 2 Eliatrope Dofus', Percidel is contacted by Goultard via their telepathic connection, though seeing it in action confuses everyone. Goultard talks to them though Rubliax and gives them all a startling revelation: Percedal is, in fact, the current incarnation of the Iop God with his powers slowly returning after Goultard, his child from a past life, defeated Rushu in battle and after Percedal went into an advanced state of being after his children, who are now revealed to be Demi-Gods, were threatened by the Count's goons. After that was said and done, Master Joris, who was frozen in the trophy room along with his two adopted sons, who are also Demi-Gods and the reincarnations of his adopted father Kerubim and his uncle Actham, for having the Dofus' themselves before they were stolen, explains that a mysterious organization known as the Brotherhood of the Forgotten has been stealing the 6 Eliatrope Dofus', which the Count was a member of. Yugo, Joris, and his adopted children go to claim two others while Adamai and Otomai go after the last two. After collecting the last four Eliatrope Dofus', Percedal uses his powers as the Iop God to erect a massive sea wall to keep the flood waters out. Immediately after doing that, however, he says goodbye to his family to go and fight Ogrest to stop future disasters.
OVA	3	"The Quest for the Six Dofus Eliatropes - Book 3: Dragon Mountain" "La Quête des Six Dofus Éliatropes - Livre 3: Mont Dragons"	November 29, 2014
Yugo volunteers to go after Percedal with the 6 Dofus', but Adamai, taking Lady Echo's words to heart that such a fight would end the world, takes a Dofus and flees. Yugo chases him, claiming that Echo is filling his head with lies. Adamai refuses to believe that, believing that this fight is still a horrible idea. The two brothers have a fight before a furious and angered Yugo claims the Dofus. Adamai says they are no longer brothers before departing for good and Yugo almost started to cry while hugging Ruel. With all 6 Dofus' in hand, Yugo, with Otomai tagging along, head to Mount Zinit to aid Percedal. They arrive just in time, but Ogrest taps into the Dofus' he has in his belly, bringing out the Dragons inside them to aid him. Yugo uses his powers to send their battlefield into space to avoid destroying the world. That, however, may prove to be their downfall as the Mountain is enormous and shards that break off from the fight rain down on the world like meteors. After a long and arduous battle, Percedal loses his right arm, causing his powers to return to Goutard. Otomai was able to get through to Ogrest and convince him to stop this madness, turning the powerful demon back into a little baby. The mountain begins its fall to the world. Using what remained of his power, Yugo was able to open a portal to the Shushu dimension. Timing it perfectly, Goutard grabs Yugo, Percedal, Otomai, and Ogrest as he leaps into the portal, allowing the mountain to destroy the Shushu dimension rather than the real world. The group appears in the desert, with Ogrest apologizing to the Dragons before they depart to their Dofus's and the six used by Yugo. When the group returned to the Sadida Kingdom, they try to introduce the newly pacified Ogrest to the king, but it was met with less than stellar reception. Elely yells at the guards and the king for threatening him and offers him her hand in friendship, which he happily accepts. A few weeks later, Percedal and Eva finally get married, with a seemingly stunned Adamai watching from a distance with Lady Echo.

=== Season 3 (2017) ===
Taking place a few years after the end of season 2, this season sees Yugo, now a tall pretty boy, and his friends reunite to take on a new foe, Oropo, who wants to destroy the world. He has lured Adamaï and other powerful demigods to his side, and he forces Yugo to climb his tower to prove his point, although they don't succeed in doing this before the final battle begins.

It is the only season not to feature Yugo's adoptive father, Alibert, and it is the first season not to feature Az since Yugo only wears an orange sleeveless shirt.

No. overall	No. in season	Title	Original release date
53	1	"Fallen Heroes" "Tomber de haut"	September 2, 2017
A few years had passed since Percedal and Yugo defeated Ogrest and Adamai left. Yugo, now pretty since he is tall, is feeling guilty after their falling out, and Ruel have been searching all over the world to find Adamai, but they keep finding no trace. Amalia has become emotionally distant to everyone including her brother and his new wife with her father sick and presumably dying. Percedal, the twins Flopin and Elely, and Evangeline, who is 9 months pregnant, are living a quiet life out in the wilderness, which Percedal likes since he doesn't have any god powers anymore. One day, a traveling Pandawa named Poo arrives at the house to escape a storm and asks to stay until it passes, which they say yes to. It turns out to be a trick as Poo attacks the family with help of a Scram named Toxine and a pair of mysterious orbs that take the children hostage, claiming that they will take them and Eva as well since she is pregnant. Eva damages the orbs but it destroys the house in the process. The fight is interrupted by a mysterious tall figure, who reveals himself to be Adamai. He attacks the family, shattering Rubilax's sword and beating Percedal with ease as he possesses the Eliatrope Dofus' Goultard was protecting. He mind-links with Yugo and shows him casting the near-dead Percedal off a cliff, with Elely following after him. The attackers take Flopin and Eva after Adamai recovers from a temporary bout of paralysis Yugo cast by accident.
54	2	"Like Father, Like Daughter" "Tel père, telle fille"	September 2, 2017
Yugo and Ruel arrive at the Sadida Castle to inform Amalia and the King of what he saw from his mind-link with Adamai. Amalia is shocked, but finds it hard to believe that he would do it. Yugo asks her to come help find Percedal, but she is hesitant. Only by order of the bed-ridden king does she go. Meanwhile, Percedal had been moved by Elely into a hollow dead tree where he can be safe since Poo has been following them. She goes out to fight him on her own and, while receiving some blows herself, is able to overpower the Pandawa though her own sheer strength mixed with her own god powers. Percedal tries to go help his daughter, but collapses and dies. His spirits pleads with Rubilax to help like he did the last time he died after the battle with Razortime. They reach an agreement- Rubliax will revive Percedal and after they rescue Eva and Flopin, he will be set free. With a new right arm formed from Rubilax, they go to help Elely, but find she has already defeated Poo. Yugo, Amalia, and Ruel arrive after it is all over, demanding that the attacker tell them where they took the others, while Ruel comments that Rubilax would have been freed if Percedal had died, implying he has become attached to the Iop. Poo refuses to talk, so Percedal shakes him to make him drop all his items. Five recall potions fall out and the group uses them. And Junior stays here in the travel car.
55	3	"Oropo's Tower" "La Tour d'Oropo"	September 2, 2017
Evangelyne and Flopin find themselves trapped in a mysterious tower. Percedal, Elely, Yugo, Amalia and Ruel go to rescue them, but they fall into a trap: a time bubble. There, they age rapidly in a short time- Percedal and Ruel become old men, Yugo becomes a handsome man, and Elely grows into a beautiful lady, and Amalia is strangely unaffected, and all suffer psychotic episodes meant to break them: Percedal being tortured by Eva and the twins about how he has more than one family, Ruel over losing someone called Arpagone, Elely attempting to be coerced into the enemy's side, Amalia being swooned by a mysterious owl-like figure, and Yugo tormented by phantoms of Qilby and Nox. The mysterious figure, calling himself Oropo and accompanied by Adamai, disengages the bubble and sends them back to their normal age, coercing them to enter and fight his brotherhood of demigods.
56	4	"Beastly Girl" "Pas si bête"	September 3, 2017
The gang, traumatized by the time bubble, enter Oropo's tower to rescue Eva and Flopin. Inside they meet an Osamodas girl, who tries to convince Elely that Oropo and his brotherhood are actually good.
57	5	"A Iop Hides Himself to Cry" "Les Iops se cachent pour pleurer"	September 3, 2017
The gang arrive at the Iop floor of the tower, which turns out to be protected by a corrupted Goultard, who goes by the name, "Dark Vlad". Percedal decides to fight him on his own and the fight brings back some memories of the moments the two of them shared.
58	6	"The Ecaflip's Scratching Post" "L'Arbre à Ecaflip"	September 9, 2017
Yugo, Amalia, Ruel, and Elely arrive at the Ecaflip floor of the tower. Its protector is Kerubim and Atcham's brother, Ush. Being an Ecaflip, he loves to gamble and invites the gang to play a deadly game.
59	7	"Pinball Hazard" "Faut pas flipper"	September 9, 2017
The gang continue their journey to the top of the tower. At the Feca floor, they encounter a demigod named Bump. He is willing to let them pass without fight, but he has a peculiar condition: he wants Yugo, Ruel and Amalia's pants to add to his underwear collection after Yugo first kissed Amalia.
60	8	"Arpagone" "Arpagone"	September 10, 2017
Arriving at the Enutrof floor, the gang find four doors, so they decide to split up in order to find the exit quicker. Along his way, Ruel reminisces about his youth and a girl he once loved named Arpagone. Ruel encounters Arpagone, who takes him captive so that a fake one can infiltrate the group. The Fake Ruel converses with Yugo about his love for Amalia, wondering if she'd ever feel the same ever she ever stopped the stubborn princess routine.
61	9	"The Sadida Temple" "Le Temple de Sadida"	September 10, 2017
Yugo, Amalia, Elely, and fake Ruel arrive at the Sadida floor where they meet the Demi-God of the race, revealing that she doesn't want to fight, but to talk. She discovers the Fake Ruel among their party and captures him. Arpagone tries to convince the real Ruel to join her and Oropo. Evangelyne and Flopin manage to escape their prison but are intercepted by Toxine and Echo. Echo tries to persuade them to come back, but Toxine electrocutes her and chains her up as her hate for Echo trumps everything else. She goes into a sadistic fight against Flopin and Eva and they somehow manage to fight her off but launching her into a Well of Shadows – a representation of her own soul, dark, evil, and chaotic – but she fires an energy bolt as she falls in, striking Eva in the womb and electrocuting her.
62	10	"When the Walls Fall Down" "Lorsque les murs tombent"	September 16, 2017
Thanks to Toxine, Evangelyne goes into labor while the baby's godly powers activate, causing untold pain as she prepares to give birth with help from Echo, who is able to minimize the pain. The baby, having a demigod's strength, causes the tower to crumble from the shockwaves it emanated during labor. Only Oropo's power is preventing the tower itself from collapsing, but only barely. He sends Adamai to find the cause, finding it to be the son that is coming. He decides to keep them safe from the crumbling debris around them so that he and Echo can have a conversation later. Eva gives birth to a boy, ending the shockwaves and the pain, but the tower is in shambles. Oropo and Adamai set the pieces with those alive gently on the ground, allowing everyone to reunite and for Percedal to meet his new son. Before she could head over, however, Fake Ruel knocks out Amalia and transforms into a fake Amalia, sending the real one to Oropo.
63	11	"Oropo" "Oropo"	September 16, 2017
Along with Amalia and sharing a tender kiss, Oropo tells the story of his birth, revealing his true identity and the motivation behind his actions. When Yugo used the Eliatrope Dofus' to help Percedal battle Ogrest, he had inadvertently created a time loop in which a shadow race, the Eliotropes, were created long ago. They were essentially copies of Yugo, but they slowly began to die off, leaving Oropo as the last.
64	12	"The Hyperzaap" "L'Hyperzaap"	September 17, 2017
Oropo is about to open the Hyperzaap and use it to destroy the gods. As he reveals his true intentions and the fact that he lied to everyone, with the Sadida Demi-Goddess revealing that it was he who set the world's tragedies into motion, such as Nox finding the Eliacube and Ogrest turning into the demon he was, his brotherhood of demigods start to turn against him. He uses his powers to send Yugo into a coma, where he confronts his demons in the forms of Qilby and Nox, who he had been suffering waking nightmares from since he arrived at the tower.
65	13	"Inglorium" "Inglorium"	September 17, 2017
The Brotherhood of the Tofu and the demigods join forces to stop Oropo from killing the gods in a final battle that will decide the fate of the World of Twelve, and the universe. After a climactic battle, Oropo activates the Hyperzaap. In a last act of self-sacrifice, Echo uses her powers to send Yugo's group and the Demi-Gods though the Hyperzaap, leaving her and Oropo, who still loves her, to die as the Eliacube creates a massive black hole that destroys Oropo's dimension. Yugo and his friends find themselves in Inglorium, the realm of the gods.

=== Season 4 (2024) ===
After the destructive battle against Oropo, but also against their own demons, Yugo and his friends find themselves at the gates of Ingloriom, the kingdom of the Gods. The Tofu Brotherhood has no time to wonder what fate the Twelve Deities have in store for them for this sacrilege: the floating territory is devastated! What happened? Is there a link between the victory they have just won and this chaos? Are they to blame for the situation or is it something much worse? About something beyond them? How far will our heroes have to go this time?

No. overall	No. in season	Title	Original release date
66	1	"Far from the World" "Loin du Monde"	February 9, 2024
As strange eyes appear over different regions of the World of Twelve, the Brotherhood of the Tofu moves through the devastated landscape of Ingloriom towards a temple bathed in an intriguing glow. They have no idea who they're about to meet in the ruins of this dimension, let alone the revelations that await Yugo in the only temple left standing.
67	2	"The Goddess of Love" "La Déesse de l'amour"	February 9, 2024
Inside the temple, the Goddess Eliatrope welcomes her sons and their friends. Still exhausted from their recent fight with Oropo, the group decides to split up and return to the World of Twelve.
68	3	"A New World" "Un nouveau Monde"	February 16, 2024
The World of Twelve's leaders gather in response to recent events. Accompanied by his mother, Yugo tries to explain their reasoning to the assembled dignitaries. Unfortunately, his words don't have the desired effect. Meanwhile, a new threat draws closer to the Sadida Kingdom.
69	4	"The Assembly" "L'assemblée"	February 16, 2024
Back in the Sadida Kingdom, Amalia learns some tragic news. Meanwhile, Yugo is getting to know his sister a little better. Far across the World of Twelve, an old man continues his journey. And at the Stroud home, Ruel wakes up to a very unpleasant surprise.
70	5	"Necromes" "Nécromes"	February 23, 2024
As Necromas approach the Island of Albuera, Armand and Amalia observe with horror the devastation caused by the creatures in their kingdom. Unfortunately, this is only the beginning of trouble for our friends and Yugo will very quickly witness it. Meanwhile, the Percedal family receives a very special visit.
71	6	"Rotalström"	February 23, 2024
Amalia and Yugo, battling a new wave of Necromas on the Sadida Kingdom, try to repel the assault. Meanwhile, on the Island of Albuera, another attack takes place, led by a huge Necrom Dragon. The monsters are dangerously approaching the coast.
72	7	"Toross Mordal"	March 1, 2024
Evangelyne takes the time to listen to Madagaskane despite some reluctance. Meanwhile, Yugo begins negotiations with the leaders of the World of 12 in order to obtain their help against the Necromas
73	8	"Traitor" "Traîtrise"	March 1, 2024
Convinced that Qilby is involved in the appearance of the Necro portals, Yugo tries to confront him. He and his friends then travel to the Necroworld, where they meet a powerful being with a thirst for Wakfu.
74	9	"Lokus"	March 8, 2024
Yugo finds himself trapped in the Necroworld at the mercy of Toross Mordal, who has no qualms about subjecting him to various forms of vicious torture. Meanwhile, at the Eliatrope Temple, things take a rough turn for the rest of the group when Qilby disappears with the six Eliatrope Dofus
75	10	"My Brother, My King" "Mon frère, mon Roi"	March 8, 2024
Nora finds herself in a difficult spot as the fight between Qilby and Lokus continues in the Eliatrope Temple. Meanwhile, Yugo, imprisoned by the Necros, is locked in a fierce battle with himself.
76	11	"Together" "Ensemble"	March 15, 2024
Yugo gathers all the members of the Brotherhood of the Tofu. After reuniting with Ruel and then the Sadlygrove family, Yugo and his friends return to the Sadida Kingdom to prepare for the final assault against the Necros.
77	12	"Armand"	March 15, 2024
The Necros' attack on the Sadida Kingdom is imminent. The Brotherhood of the Tofu is ready to face them, together with the Eliatrope and Sadida armies. The final battle to defend the Sadida Kingdom has begun. Yugo and his friends do everything they can to push back the Necros, but they're in for an epic battle against these Wakfu-devouring monsters.
78	13	"Consecration" "Consécration"	March 15, 2024
The war with the Necros continues… Yugo and his friends must redouble their efforts to stop Toross Mordal and his army. Peace will never return to the World of Twelve until the invasion of the Wakfu eaters has been thwarted.
