= Déborah Perret =

French voice actress

Déborah Perret is a French voice actress. She is the daughter of Danielle Perret.

== Filmography ==
- Les soeurs Hamlet (1996)

== Dubbing ==
=== Cinema ===
- True Romance (1993)
- Seven (1995)
- Get Shorty (1995)
- Boogie Nights (1997)
- Blade (1998)
- Small Soldiers (1998)
- Beowulf (1999)
- Drop Dead Gorgeous (1999)
- Forces of Nature (1999)
- Magnolia (1999)
- Rush Hour 2 (2001)
- The Lord of the Rings: The Fellowship of the Ring (2001)
- Monster's Ball (2001)
- The Rules of Attraction (2002)
- The Lord of the Rings: The Two Towers (2002)
- Star Trek Nemesis (2002)
- The Lord of the Rings: The Return of the King (2003)
- Final Destination 2 (2003)
- Northfork (2003)
- Crash (2004)
- The Incredibles (2004)
- Assault on Precinct 13 (2005)
- The Interpreter (2005)
- A History of Violence (2005)
- Lonely Hearts (2006)
- Love in the Time of Cholera (2007)
- The Bank Job (2008)

=== Television ===
- Santa Barbara (1984-1993)
- ER (1995-2003)
- Mortal Kombat: Konquest (1998-1999)
- Wizards of Waverly Place (2007-2011)
- Camp Rock (2008)
- Merlin (2008)
- Wizards of Waverly Place: The Movie (2009)
- Camp Rock 2 (2010)
